= List of mountain peaks of North America =

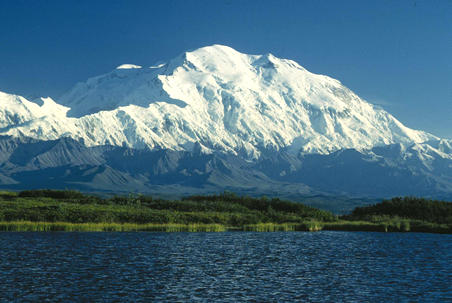
Denali in Alaska is the highest mountain peak of North America. Denali is the third most topographically prominent and third most topographically isolated summit on Earth after Mount Everest and Aconcagua.

This article comprises three sortable tables of major mountain peaks of greater North America.

The summit of a mountain or hill may be measured in three principal ways:

1. The topographic elevation of a summit measures the height of the summit above a geodetic sea level. The first table below ranks the 100 highest major summits of greater North America by elevation.
2. The topographic prominence of a summit is a measure of how high the summit rises above its surroundings. The second table below ranks the 50 most prominent summits of greater North America.
3. The topographic isolation (or radius of dominance) of a summit measures how far the summit lies from its nearest point of equal elevation. The third table below ranks the 50 most isolated major summits of greater North America.

== Highest major summits ==
Of the 100 highest major summits of greater North America, only Denali exceeds 6000 meters (19,685 feet) elevation, 11 peaks exceed 5000 meters (16,404 feet), and all 100 peaks exceed 4076 meters (13,373 feet) elevation.

Of these 100 peaks, 81 are located in the United States, 17 in Canada, seven in México, and one in Guatemala. Six of these peaks lie on the Canada-United States border.

The 100 highest summits of greater North America with at least 500 meters of topographic prominence
Rank	Mountain peak	Region	Mountain range	Elevation	Prominence	Isolation	Location
1	Denali (Note: The summit of Denali is the highest point of the Alaska Range, the State of Alaska, the United States of America, and greater North America. Denali is the third most topographically prominent and third most topographically isolated summit on Earth after Mount Everest and Aconcagua.) (Mount McKinley)	Alaska	Alaska Range	6190.5 m 20,310 ft	6141 m 20,146 ft	7,450 km 4,629 mi	63.0690°N 151.0063°W
2	Mount Logan (Note: The summit of Mount Logan is the highest point of the Saint Elias Mountains, Yukon, and all of Canada.)	Yukon	Saint Elias Mountains	5956 m 19,541 ft	5247 m 17,215 ft	623 km 387 mi	60.5671°N 140.4055°W
3	Pico de Orizaba (Note: The summit of Pico de Orizaba is the highest point of Estado Libre y Soberano de Puebla, Estado Libre y Soberano de Veracruz de Ignacio de la Llave, and all of México.) (Citlaltépetl)	Puebla; Veracruz	Cordillera Neovolcanica	5636 m 18,491 ft	4922 m 16,148 ft	2,690 km 1,672 mi	19.0305°N 97.2698°W
4	Mount Saint Elias (Note: Mount Saint Elias is the second highest major summit of both Canada and the United States.)	Alaska; Yukon	Saint Elias Mountains	5489 m 18,009 ft	3429 m 11,250 ft	41.3 km 25.6 mi	60.2927°N 140.9307°W
5	Popocatépetl (Note: Popocatépetl on the border of Puebla is the highest point of both Estado Libre y Soberano de México and Estado Libre y Soberano de Morelos.) (Note: Popocatépetl is the southernmost 5000-meter (16,404-foot) summit of México and greater North America.)	México; Morelos; Puebla	Cordillera Neovolcanica	5410 m 17,749 ft	3040 m 9,974 ft	143 km 88.8 mi	19.0225°N 98.6278°W
6	Mount Foraker (Note: Mount Foraker is the westernmost 5000-meter (16,404-foot) summit of Alaska, the United States, and greater North America.)	Alaska	Alaska Range	5304 m 17,400 ft	2210 m 7,250 ft	23 km 14.27 mi	62.9604°N 151.3998°W
7	Mount Lucania (Note: The summit of Mount Lucania is the highest point of the northern Saint Elias Mountains.) (Note: Mount Lucania is the northernmost summit of its elevation in Canada.)	Yukon	Saint Elias Mountains	5260 m 17,257 ft	3080 m 10,105 ft	43 km 26.7 mi	61.0215°N 140.4661°W
8	Iztaccíhuatl (Note: Iztaccíhuatl is the northernmost and westernmost 5000-meter (16,404-foot) summit of México.)	México; Puebla	Cordillera Neovolcanica	5230 m 17,159 ft	1560 m 5,118 ft	17.51 km 10.88 mi	19.1802°N 98.6415°W
9	King Peak	Yukon	Saint Elias Mountains	5173 m 16,972 ft	1073 m 3,520 ft	4.68 km 2.91 mi	60.5833°N 140.6549°W
10	Mount Bona (Note: The summit of Mount Bona is the highest point of the northwest Saint Elias Mountains. Some maps show an elevation of 16,421 feet (5,005 m), and others indicate 16,550±50 feet (5045±15 meters). Mount Bona may or may not be higher than Mount Steele, whose exact elevation is also uncertain.)	Alaska	Saint Elias Mountains	5044 m 16,550 ft	2103 m 6,900 ft	80 km 49.7 mi	61.3856°N 141.7495°W
11	Mount Steele (Note: Mount Steele is the northernmost and easternmost 5000-meter (16,404-foot) summit of Canada. Older maps show an elevation of 5,073 metres (16,644 ft), but more recent maps indicate 5,020±20 metres (about 16,470±60 ft). Mount Steele may or may not be higher than Mount Bona, whose exact elevation is also uncertain.)	Yukon	Saint Elias Mountains	5020 m 16,470 ft	760 m 2,493 ft	9.45 km 5.87 mi	61.0929°N 140.3118°W
12	Mount Blackburn (Note: The summit of Mount Blackburn is the highest point of the Wrangell Mountains.)	Alaska	Wrangell Mountains	4996 m 16,390 ft	3548 m 11,640 ft	97.6 km 60.7 mi	61.7305°N 143.4031°W
13	Mount Sanford	Alaska	Wrangell Mountains	4949 m 16,237 ft	2343 m 7,687 ft	64.8 km 40.3 mi	62.2132°N 144.1292°W
14	Mount Wood (Note: Mount Wood is the northernmost summit of its elevation in Canada.)	Yukon	Saint Elias Mountains	4860 m 15,945 ft	1200 m 3,937 ft	18.95 km 11.77 mi	61.2326°N 140.5123°W
15	Mount Vancouver (Note: Mount Vancouver is the easternmost summit of its elevation in Canada.)	Yukon	Saint Elias Mountains	4812 m 15,787 ft	2712 m 8,898 ft	44 km 27.4 mi	60.3589°N 139.6980°W
16	Mount Slaggard	Yukon	Saint Elias Mountains	4742 m 15,558 ft	522 m 1,713 ft	7.74 km 4.81 mi	61.1727°N 140.5851°W
17	Nevado de Toluca (Note: Nevado de Toluca is the westernmost summit of its elevation in México.) (Volcán Xinantécatl)	México	Cordillera Neovolcanica	4690 m 15,387 ft	2225 m 7,300 ft	118.4 km 73.6 mi	19.1020°N 99.7677°W
18	Mount Fairweather (Note: Mount Fairweather lies on the international border between Alaska and British Columbia. The peak is the highest point of the Canadian Province of British Columbia and the southernmost and easternmost summit of its elevation in both Canada and the United States.) (Fairweather Mountain)	Alaska; British Columbia	Saint Elias Mountains	4671 m 15,325 ft	3961 m 12,995 ft	200 km 124.4 mi	58.9064°N 137.5265°W
19	Mount Hubbard	Alaska; Yukon	Saint Elias Mountains	4557 m 14,951 ft	2457 m 8,061 ft	34.4 km 21.3 mi	60.3194°N 139.0726°W
20	Mount Bear	Alaska	Saint Elias Mountains	4520 m 14,831 ft	1540 m 5,054 ft	32.4 km 20.1 mi	61.2834°N 141.1433°W
21	Mount Walsh	Yukon	Saint Elias Mountains	4506 m 14,783 ft	1366 m 4,482 ft	18.76 km 11.66 mi	61.0037°N 140.0171°W
22	Mount Hunter	Alaska	Alaska Range	4442 m 14,573 ft	1418 m 4,653 ft	11.07 km 6.88 mi	62.9504°N 151.0915°W
23	La Malintzin (Note: La Malintzin on the border of Puebla is the highest point of Estado Libre y Soberano de Tlaxcala.) (Note: La Malintzin is the northernmost summit of its elevation in México.) (La Malinche)	Puebla; Tlaxcala	Cordillera Neovolcanica	4430 m 14,534 ft	1920 m 6,299 ft	63.9 km 39.7 mi	19.2310°N 98.0321°W
24	Mount Whitney (Note: The summit of Mount Whitney is the highest point of the Sierra Nevada, the State of California, and the contiguous United States.) (Note: Mount Whitney is the southernmost and easternmost summit of its elevation in United States.)	California	Sierra Nevada	4421 m 14,505 ft	3072 m 10,080 ft	2,649 km 1,646 mi	36.5786°N 118.2920°W
25	Mount Alverstone (Boundary Point 180)	Alaska; Yukon	Saint Elias Mountains	4420 m 14,500 ft	594 m 1,950 ft	3.62 km 2.25 mi	60.3518°N 139.0749°W
26	University Peak	Alaska	Saint Elias Mountains	4410 m 14,470 ft	978 m 3,210 ft	5.97 km 3.71 mi	61.3272°N 141.7867°W
27	Mount Elbert (Note: The summit of Mount Elbert is the highest point of the U.S. State of Colorado, the Rocky Mountains of North America, and the entire Mississippi River drainage basin.)	Colorado	Sawatch Range	4401.2 m 14,440 ft	2772 m 9,093 ft	1,079 km 671 mi	39.1178°N 106.4454°W
28	Mount Massive (Note: Mount Massive is the second highest major summit of the Rocky Mountains.) (Note: The elevation of Mount Massive includes an adjustment of +2.087 m (6.85 ft) from NGVD 29 to NAVD 88.)	Colorado	Sawatch Range	4398 m 14,428 ft	598 m 1,961 ft	8.14 km 5.06 mi	39.1875°N 106.4757°W
29	Mount Harvard (Note: The summit of Mount Harvard is the highest point of the Collegiate Peaks.) (Note: Mount Harvard is the southernmost and easternmost summit of its elevation in the Rocky Mountains.)	Colorado	Sawatch Range	4395.6 m 14,421 ft	719 m 2,360 ft	24 km 14.92 mi	38.9244°N 106.3207°W
30	Mount Rainier (Note: The summit of Mount Rainier is the highest point of the Cascade Range and the U.S. State of Washington. Mount Rainier is the most prominent summit in the contiguous United States and the fourth most prominent in North America.) (Note: The elevation of Mount Rainier includes an adjustment of +1.914 m (6.28 ft) from NGVD 29 to NAVD 88.)	Washington	Cascade Range	4394 m 14,417 ft	4026 m 13,210 ft	1,177 km 731 mi	46.8529°N 121.7604°W
31	Mount Williamson (Note: The elevation of Mount Williamson includes an adjustment of +1.807 m (5.93 ft) from NGVD 29 to NAVD 88.)	California	Sierra Nevada	4383 m 14,379 ft	511 m 1,676 ft	8.7 km 5.41 mi	36.6559°N 118.3111°W
32	McArthur Peak	Yukon	Saint Elias Mountains	4380 m 14,370 ft	960 m 3,150 ft	9.1 km 5.65 mi	60.6069°N 140.2144°W
33	Blanca Peak (Note: The summit of Blanca Peak is the highest point of the Sangre de Cristo Mountains and the entire Rio Grande drainage basin.) (Note: Blanca Peak is the southernmost ultra-prominent summit of the Rocky Mountains.) (Note: The elevation of Blanca Peak includes an adjustment of +1.755 m (5.76 ft) from NGVD 29 to NAVD 88.)	Colorado	Sangre de Cristo Mountains	4374 m 14,351 ft	1623 m 5,326 ft	166.4 km 103.4 mi	37.5775°N 105.4856°W
34	La Plata Peak (Note: The elevation of La Plata Peak includes an adjustment of +1.983 m (6.51 ft) from NGVD 29 to NAVD 88.)	Colorado	Sawatch Range	4372 m 14,343 ft	560 m 1,836 ft	10.11 km 6.28 mi	39.0294°N 106.4729°W
35	Uncompahgre Peak (Note: The summit of Uncompahgre Peak is the highest point of the San Juan Mountains and the entire Gulf of California drainage basin.) (Note: Uncompahgre Peak is the westernmost summit of its elevation in the Rocky Mountains.)	Colorado	San Juan Mountains	4365 m 14,321 ft	1304 m 4,277 ft	136.8 km 85 mi	38.0717°N 107.4621°W
36	Crestone Peak (Note: The summit of Crestone Peak is the highest point of the Crestones.) (Note: The elevation of Crestone Peak includes an adjustment of +1.76 m (5.77 ft) from NGVD 29 to NAVD 88.)	Colorado	Sangre de Cristo Range	4359 m 14,300 ft	1388 m 4,554 ft	44 km 27.4 mi	37.9669°N 105.5855°W
37	Mount Lincoln (Note: The summit of Mount Lincoln is the highest point of the Mosquito Range and the entire Missouri River drainage basin.) (Note: Mount Lincoln is the northernmost summit of its elevation in the Rocky Mountains.)	Colorado	Mosquito Range	4356.5 m 14,293 ft	1177 m 3,862 ft	36.2 km 22.5 mi	39.3515°N 106.1116°W
38	Castle Peak (Note: The summit of Castle Peak is the highest point of the Elk Mountains.)	Colorado	Elk Mountains	4352.2 m 14,279 ft	721 m 2,365 ft	33.6 km 20.9 mi	39.0097°N 106.8614°W
39	Grays Peak (Note: The summit of Grays Peak is the highest point of the Front Range and the Continental Divide in North America.) (Note: Grays Peak is the northernmost summit of its elevation in the Rocky Mountains.)	Colorado	Front Range	4352 m 14,278 ft	844 m 2,770 ft	40.2 km 25 mi	39.6339°N 105.8176°W
40	Mount Antero (Note: The summit of Mount Antero is the highest point of the southern Sawatch Range.)	Colorado	Sawatch Range	4351.4 m 14,276 ft	763 m 2,503 ft	28.4 km 17.67 mi	38.6741°N 106.2462°W
41	Mount Evans (Note: The summit elevation of Mount Evans includes a vertical offset of +1.798 m (5.9 ft) from the station benchmark.)	Colorado	Front Range	4350 m 14,271 ft	844 m 2,770 ft	15.76 km 9.79 mi	39.5883°N 105.6438°W
42	Longs Peak (Note: The summit of Longs Peak is the highest point of the northern Front Range.) (Note: Longs Peak is the northernmost 14,000-foot (4267-meter) summit of the Rocky Mountains.)	Colorado	Front Range	4346 m 14,259 ft	896 m 2,940 ft	70.2 km 43.6 mi	40.2550°N 105.6151°W
43	Mount Wilson (Note: The summit of Mount Wilson is the highest point of the San Miguel Mountains.) (Note: Mount Wilson is the westernmost summit of its elevation in the Rocky Mountains.) (Note: The elevation of Mount Wilson includes an adjustment of +1.899 m (6.23 ft) from NGVD 29 to NAVD 88.)	Colorado	San Miguel Mountains	4344 m 14,252 ft	1227 m 4,024 ft	53.1 km 33 mi	37.8391°N 107.9916°W
44	White Mountain Peak (Note: The summit of White Mountain Peak is the highest point of the White Mountains.)	California	White Mountains	4344 m 14,252 ft	2193 m 7,196 ft	108.6 km 67.4 mi	37.6341°N 118.2557°W
45	North Palisade (Note: The summit of North Palisade is the highest point of the Palisades.) (Note: The elevation of North Palisade includes an adjustment of +1.867 m (6.13 ft) from NGVD 29 to NAVD 88.)	California	Sierra Nevada	4343 m 14,248 ft	882 m 2,894 ft	51.8 km 32.2 mi	37.0943°N 118.5145°W
46	Mount Princeton	Colorado	Sawatch Range	4329.3 m 14,204 ft	664 m 2,177 ft	8.36 km 5.19 mi	38.7492°N 106.2424°W
47	Mount Yale	Colorado	Sawatch Range	4328.2 m 14,200 ft	578 m 1,896 ft	8.93 km 5.55 mi	38.8442°N 106.3138°W
48	Mount Shasta (Note: The summit of Mount Shasta is the highest point of the southern Cascade Range.)	California	Cascade Range	4321.8 m 14,179 ft	2979 m 9,772 ft	539 km 335 mi	41.4092°N 122.1949°W
49	Maroon Peak	Colorado	Elk Mountains	4317 m 14,163 ft	712 m 2,336 ft	12.97 km 8.06 mi	39.0708°N 106.9890°W
50	Mount Wrangell	Alaska	Wrangell Mountains	4317 m 14,163 ft	1711 m 5,613 ft	23.8 km 14.79 mi	62.0059°N 144.0187°W
51	Mount Sneffels (Note: The summit of Mount Sneffels is the highest point of the Sneffels Range.)	Colorado	Sneffels Range	4315.4 m 14,158 ft	930 m 3,050 ft	25.3 km 15.71 mi	38.0038°N 107.7923°W
52	Capitol Peak (Note: The elevation of Capitol Peak includes an adjustment of +1.991 m (6.53 ft) from NGVD 29 to NAVD 88.)	Colorado	Elk Mountains	4309 m 14,137 ft	533 m 1,750 ft	11.98 km 7.44 mi	39.1503°N 107.0829°W
53	Pikes Peak (Note: Pikes Peak is the easternmost 14,000-foot (4267-meter) summit and ultra-prominent summit of the Rocky Mountains. Pikes Peak was the inspiration for the lyrics of America the Beautiful.)	Colorado	Front Range	4302.31 m 14,115 ft	1686 m 5,530 ft	97.6 km 60.6 mi	38.8405°N 105.0442°W
54	Windom Peak (Note: The summit of Windom Peak is the highest point of the Needle Mountains.) (Note: Mount Eolus may be higher than Windom Peak.) (Note: The elevation of Windom Peak includes an adjustment of +1.785 m (5.86 ft) from NGVD 29 to NAVD 88.)	Colorado	Needle Mountains	4296 m 14,093 ft	667 m 2,187 ft	42.4 km 26.3 mi	37.6212°N 107.5919°W
55	Mount Augusta	Alaska; Yukon	Saint Elias Mountains	4289 m 14,070 ft	1549 m 5,082 ft	23.2 km 14.41 mi	60.3074°N 140.4584°W
56	Handies Peak	Colorado	San Juan Mountains	4284.8 m 14,058 ft	582 m 1,908 ft	18 km 11.18 mi	37.9130°N 107.5044°W
57	Culebra Peak (Note: The summit of Culebra Peak is the highest point of the Culebra Range.) (Note: Culebra Peak is the southernmost 14,000-foot (4267-meter) summit of the Rocky Mountains.) (Note: The elevation of Culebra Peak includes an adjustment of +1.74 m (5.71 ft) from NGVD 29 to NAVD 88.)	Colorado	Culebra Range	4283 m 14,053 ft	1471 m 4,827 ft	56.9 km 35.4 mi	37.1224°N 105.1858°W
58	San Luis Peak (Note: The summit of San Luis Peak is the highest point of the La Garita Mountains.)	Colorado	La Garita Mountains	4273.8 m 14,022 ft	949 m 3,113 ft	43.4 km 26.9 mi	37.9868°N 106.9313°W
59	Mount of the Holy Cross (Note: The summit of Mount of the Holy Cross is the highest point of the northern Sawatch Range.) (Note: The summit elevation of Mount of the Holy Cross includes a vertical offset of +0.61 m (2 ft) from the station benchmark.)	Colorado	Sawatch Range	4270.5 m 14,011 ft	644 m 2,113 ft	29.6 km 18.41 mi	39.4668°N 106.4817°W
60	Nevado de Colima (Note: The summit of Nevado de Colima is the highest point of Estado Libre y Soberano de Jalisco.) (Note: Nevado de Colima is the northernmost and westernmost 4000-meter (13,123-foot) summit of México.)	Jalisco	Cordillera Neovolcanica	4270 m 14,009 ft	2720 m 8,924 ft	405 km 252 mi	19.5633°N 103.6087°W
61	Grizzly Peak	Colorado	Sawatch Range	4265.6 m 13,995 ft	588 m 1,928 ft	10.89 km 6.77 mi	39.0425°N 106.5976°W
62	Mount Humphreys (Note: The elevation of Mount Humphreys includes an adjustment of +1.842 m (6.04 ft) from NGVD 29 to NAVD 88.)	California	Sierra Nevada	4265 m 13,992 ft	781 m 2,563 ft	23.7 km 14.71 mi	37.2705°N 118.6730°W
63	Mount Keith (Note: The elevation of Mount Keith includes an adjustment of +1.795 m (5.89 ft) from NGVD 29 to NAVD 88.)	California	Sierra Nevada	4262 m 13,982 ft	590 m 1,936 ft	4.97 km 3.09 mi	36.7001°N 118.3436°W
64	Mount Strickland (Note: Mount Strickland is the northernmost summit of its elevation in Canada.)	Yukon	Saint Elias Mountains	4260 m 13,976 ft	800 m 2,625 ft	7.35 km 4.57 mi	61.2365°N 140.6755°W
65	Mount Ouray (Note: The summit of Mount Ouray is the highest point of the far southern Sawatch Range.)	Colorado	Sawatch Range	4255.4 m 13,961 ft	810 m 2,659 ft	21.9 km 13.58 mi	38.4227°N 106.2247°W
66	Vermilion Peak (Note: The elevation of Vermilion Peak includes an adjustment of +1.827 m (5.99 ft) from NGVD 29 to NAVD 88.)	Colorado	San Juan Mountains	4237 m 13,900 ft	642 m 2,105 ft	14.6 km 9.07 mi	37.7993°N 107.8285°W
67	Avalanche Peak (Note: Avalanche Peak is the northernmost summit of its elevation in Canada.)	Yukon	Saint Elias Mountains	4228 m 13,871 ft	608 m 1,995 ft	4.54 km 2.82 mi	61.2401°N 140.7597°W
68	Atna Peaks	Alaska	Wrangell Mountains	4225 m 13,860 ft	674 m 2,210 ft	5.86 km 3.64 mi	61.7495°N 143.2414°W
69	Volcán Tajumulco (Note: The summit of Volcán Tajumulco is the highest point of the Sierra de las Nubes, the Republic of Guatemala, and all of Central America.) (Note: Volcán Tajumulco is the southernmost and easternmost 4000-meter (13,123-foot) summit of greater North America.)	Guatemala	Sierra de las Nubes	4220 m 13,845 ft	3990 m 13,091 ft	722 km 448 mi	15.0430°N 91.9037°W
70	Regal Mountain	Alaska	Wrangell Mountains	4220 m 13,845 ft	1340 m 4,395 ft	19.72 km 12.25 mi	61.7438°N 142.8675°W
71	Mount Darwin (Note: The elevation of Mount Darwin includes an adjustment of +1.886 m (6.19 ft) from NGVD 29 to NAVD 88.)	California	Sierra Nevada	4218 m 13,837 ft	576 m 1,891 ft	11.48 km 7.13 mi	37.1669°N 118.6721°W
72	Mount Hayes (Note: The summit of Mount Hayes is the highest point of the Hayes Range.) (Note: Mount Hayes is the northernmost 4000-meter (13,123-foot) summit of Alaska, the United States, and greater North America.)	Alaska	Alaska Range	4216 m 13,832 ft	3507 m 11,507 ft	202 km 125.5 mi	63.6203°N 146.7178°W
73	Mount Silverheels	Colorado	Front Range	4215 m 13,829 ft	696 m 2,283 ft	8.82 km 5.48 mi	39.3394°N 106.0054°W
74	Rio Grande Pyramid	Colorado	San Juan Mountains	4214.4 m 13,827 ft	573 m 1,881 ft	17.31 km 10.76 mi	37.6797°N 107.3924°W
75	Cofre de Perote (Note: Cofre de Perote is the easternmost summit of its elevation in México.)	Veracruz	Cordillera Neovolcanica	4210 m 13,812 ft	1340 m 4,396 ft	52.9 km 32.9 mi	19.4940°N 97.1480°W
76	Gannett Peak (Note: The summit of Gannett Peak is the highest point of the Wind River Range, the U.S. State of Wyoming, and the central Rocky Mountains.) (Note: Gannett Peak is the northernmost and westernmost summit of its elevation in the Rocky Mountains.)	Wyoming	Wind River Range	4209.1 m 13,809 ft	2157 m 7,076 ft	467 km 290 mi	43.1842°N 109.6542°W
77	Mount Kaweah (Note: The summit of Mount Kaweah is the highest point of the Great Western Divide.) (Note: Mount Kaweah is the southernmost summit of its elevation in United States.) (Note: The elevation of Mount Kaweah includes an adjustment of +1.652 m (5.42 ft) from NGVD 29 to NAVD 88.)	California	Sierra Nevada	4209 m 13,807 ft	618 m 2,027 ft	17.27 km 10.73 mi	36.5261°N 118.4785°W
78	Grand Teton (Note: The summit of Grand Teton is the highest point of the Teton Range.) (Note: Grand Teton is the northernmost and westernmost 4000-meter (13,123-foot) summit of the Rocky Mountains.)	Wyoming	Teton Range	4198.7 m 13,775 ft	1995 m 6,545 ft	111.6 km 69.4 mi	43.7412°N 110.8024°W
79	Mount Cook	Alaska; Yukon	Saint Elias Mountains	4194 m 13,760 ft	2350 m 7,710 ft	23.4 km 14.54 mi	60.1816°N 139.9811°W
80	Mount Morgan	California	Sierra Nevada	4193.4 m 13,758 ft	807 m 2,648 ft	15.87 km 9.86 mi	37.4053°N 118.7329°W
81	Mount Gabb (Note: The elevation of Mount Gabb includes an adjustment of +1.958 m (6.42 ft) from NGVD 29 to NAVD 88.)	California	Sierra Nevada	4190 m 13,747 ft	793 m 2,601 ft	6.89 km 4.28 mi	37.3769°N 118.8025°W
82	Bald Mountain (Note: The elevation of Bald Mountain includes an adjustment of +1.922 m (6.31 ft) from NGVD 29 to NAVD 88.)	Colorado	Front Range	4173 m 13,690 ft	640 m 2,099 ft	12.09 km 7.51 mi	39.4448°N 105.9705°W
83	Mount Oso (Note: The elevation of Mount Oso includes an adjustment of +1.776 m (5.83 ft) from NGVD 29 to NAVD 88.)	Colorado	San Juan Mountains	4173 m 13,690 ft	507 m 1,664 ft	8.71 km 5.41 mi	37.6070°N 107.4936°W
84	Mount Jackson	Colorado	Sawatch Range	4168.5 m 13,676 ft	552 m 1,810 ft	5.16 km 3.21 mi	39.4853°N 106.5367°W
85	Mount Tom (Note: The elevation of Mount Tom includes an adjustment of +1.379 m (4.52 ft) from NGVD 29 to NAVD 88.)	California	Sierra Nevada	4163 m 13,657 ft	607 m 1,992 ft	7.67 km 4.77 mi	37.3385°N 118.6585°W
86	Bard Peak (Note: The elevation of Bard Peak includes an adjustment of +1.707 m (5.6 ft) from NGVD 29 to NAVD 88.)	Colorado	Front Range	4159 m 13,647 ft	518 m 1,701 ft	8.74 km 5.43 mi	39.7204°N 105.8044°W
87	West Spanish Peak (Note: West Spanish Peak is the easternmost 4000-meter (13,123-foot) summit of the Rocky Mountains and the United States.) (Note: The elevation of West Spanish Peak includes an adjustment of +1.468 m (4.82 ft) from NGVD 29 to NAVD 88.)	Colorado	Spanish Peaks	4155 m 13,631 ft	1123 m 3,686 ft	32 km 19.87 mi	37.3756°N 104.9934°W
88	Mount Powell (Note: The summit of Mount Powell is the highest point of the Gore Range.) (Note: The elevation of Mount Powell includes an adjustment of +1.771 m (5.81 ft) from NGVD 29 to NAVD 88.)	Colorado	Gore Range	4141 m 13,586 ft	914 m 3,000 ft	34.6 km 21.5 mi	39.7601°N 106.3407°W
89	Hagues Peak (Note: The summit of Hagues Peak is the highest point of the Mummy Range.)	Colorado	Mummy Range	4137 m 13,573 ft	738 m 2,420 ft	25.3 km 15.7 mi	40.4845°N 105.6464°W
90	Mount Dubois (Note: The elevation of Mount Dubois includes an adjustment of +1.879 m (6.16 ft) from NGVD 29 to NAVD 88.)	California	White Mountains	4135 m 13,565 ft	713 m 2,339 ft	15.5 km 9.63 mi	37.7834°N 118.3432°W
91	Tower Mountain (Note: The elevation of Tower Mountain includes an adjustment of +1.796 m (5.89 ft) from NGVD 29 to NAVD 88.)	Colorado	San Juan Mountains	4132 m 13,558 ft	504 m 1,652 ft	7.86 km 4.88 mi	37.8573°N 107.6230°W
92	Treasure Mountain (Note: The elevation of Treasure Mountain includes an adjustment of +2.008 m (6.59 ft) from NGVD 29 to NAVD 88.)	Colorado	Elk Mountains	4125 m 13,535 ft	862 m 2,828 ft	11.13 km 6.92 mi	39.0244°N 107.1228°W
93	Kings Peak (Note: The summit of Kings Peak is the highest point of the Uinta Mountains, the U.S. State of Utah, and the western Rocky Mountains.) (Note: The elevation of Kings Peak includes an adjustment of +1.807 m (5.93 ft) from NGVD 29 to NAVD 88.)	Utah	Uinta Mountains	4125 m 13,534 ft	1938 m 6,358 ft	268 km 166.6 mi	40.7763°N 110.3729°W
94	North Arapaho Peak (Note: The summit of North Arapaho Peak is the highest point of the Indian Peaks.) (Note: The elevation of North Arapaho Peak includes an adjustment of +1.763 m (5.78 ft) from NGVD 29 to NAVD 88.)	Colorado	Front Range	4117 m 13,508 ft	507 m 1,665 ft	24.8 km 15.38 mi	40.0265°N 105.6504°W
95	Mount Pinchot (Note: The elevation of Mount Pinchot includes an adjustment of +1.81 m (5.94 ft) from NGVD 29 to NAVD 88.)	California	Sierra Nevada	4115 m 13,500 ft	643 m 2,110 ft	7.58 km 4.71 mi	36.9473°N 118.4054°W
96	Mount Natazhat	Alaska	Saint Elias Mountains	4095 m 13,435 ft	1824 m 5,985 ft	24.9 km 15.49 mi	61.5217°N 141.1030°W
97	Mount Jarvis	Alaska	Wrangell Mountains	4091 m 13,421 ft	1454 m 4,771 ft	17.95 km 11.15 mi	62.0234°N 143.6198°W
98	Parry Peak (Note: The elevation of Parry Peak includes an adjustment of +1.763 m (5.78 ft) from NGVD 29 to NAVD 88.)	Colorado	Front Range	4083 m 13,397 ft	524 m 1,720 ft	15.22 km 9.46 mi	39.8381°N 105.7132°W
99	Bill Williams Peak (Note: The summit of Bill Williams Peak is the highest point of the Williams Mountains.) (Note: The elevation of Bill Williams Peak includes an adjustment of +2.044 m (6.71 ft) from NGVD 29 to NAVD 88.)	Colorado	Williams Mountains	4081 m 13,389 ft	513 m 1,682 ft	5.98 km 3.72 mi	39.1806°N 106.6102°W
100	Sultan Mountain (Note: The elevation of Sultan Mountain includes an adjustment of +1.649 m (5.41 ft) from NGVD 29 to NAVD 88.)	Colorado	San Juan Mountains	4076 m 13,373 ft	569 m 1,868 ft	7.39 km 4.59 mi	37.7859°N 107.7038°W

== Most prominent summits ==
Of the 50 most prominent summits of greater North America, only Denali exceeds 6000 meters (19,685 feet) of topographic prominence, Mount Logan exceeds 5000 meters (16,404 feet), four peaks exceed 4000 meters (13,123 feet), 17 peaks exceed 3000 meters (9843 feet), and all 50 peaks exceed 2343 meters (7687 feet) of topographic prominence. All of these peaks are ultra-prominent summits.

Of these 50 peaks, 27 are located in the United States, 19 in Canada, three in México, and one each in Guatemala, Costa Rica, Greenland, the Dominican Republic, and Haiti. Four of these peaks lie on the Canada-United States border.

The 50 most topographically prominent summits of greater North America
Rank	Mountain peak	Region	Mountain range	Elevation	Prominence	Isolation	Location
1	Denali	Alaska	Alaska Range	6190.5 m 20,310 ft	6141 m 20,146 ft	7,450.24	63.0690°N 151.0063°W
2	Mount Logan	Yukon	Saint Elias Mountains	5956 m 19,541 ft	5247 m 17,215 ft	623 km 387 mi	60.5671°N 140.4055°W
3	Pico de Orizaba (Citlaltépetl)	Puebla; Veracruz	Cordillera Neovolcanica	5636 m 18,491 ft	4922 m 16,148 ft	2,690.14	19.0305°N 97.2698°W
4	Mount Rainier	Washington	Cascade Range	4394 m 14,417 ft	4026 m 13,210 ft	1,176.72	46.8529°N 121.7604°W
5	Volcán Tajumulco	Guatemala	Sierra de las Nubes	4220 m 13,845 ft	3990 m 13,091 ft	722 km 448 mi	15.0430°N 91.9037°W
6	Mount Fairweather (Fairweather Mountain)	Alaska; British Columbia	Saint Elias Mountains	4671 m 15,325 ft	3961 m 12,995 ft	200 km 124.4 mi	58.9064°N 137.5265°W
7	Chirripó Grande (Note: The summit of Chirripó Grande is the highest point of the Republic of Costa Rica.) (Note: Chirripó Grande is the southernmost and easternmost summit of its elevation in Central America and greater North America.) (Cerro Chirripó)	Costa Rica	Cordillera de Talamanca	3819 m 12,530 ft	3755 m 12,320 ft	878 km 546 mi	9.4843°N 83.4889°W
8	Gunnbjørn Fjeld (Note: The summit of Gunnbjørn Fjeld is the highest point of the Island of Greenland, Kalaallit Nunaat, the Kingdom of Denmark, and the entire Arctic.) (Note: Gunnbjørn Fjeld is the easternmost summit of its elevation in greater North America.)	Greenland	Island of Greenland	3694 m 12,119 ft	3694 m 12,119 ft	3,254.13	68.9184°N 29.8991°W
9	Mount Blackburn	Alaska	Wrangell Mountains	4996 m 16,390 ft	3548 m 11,640 ft	97.6 km 60.7 mi	61.7305°N 143.4031°W
10	Mount Hayes	Alaska	Alaska Range	4216 m 13,832 ft	3507 m 11,507 ft	202 km 125.5 mi	63.6203°N 146.7178°W
11	Mount Saint Elias	Alaska; Yukon	Saint Elias Mountains	5489 m 18,009 ft	3429 m 11,250 ft	41.3 km 25.6 mi	60.2927°N 140.9307°W
12	Mount Waddington (Note: The summit of Mount Waddington is the highest point of the Coast Mountains.) (Note: Mount Waddington is the southernmost and easternmost 4000-meter (13,123-foot) summit of Canada.)	British Columbia	Coast Mountains	4019 m 13,186 ft	3289 m 10,791 ft	562 km 349 mi	51.3737°N 125.2636°W
13	Mount Marcus Baker (Note: The summit of Mount Marcus Baker is the highest point of the Chugach Mountains.)	Alaska	Chugach Mountains	4016 m 13,176 ft	3277 m 10,751 ft	203 km 126.3 mi	61.4374°N 147.7525°W
14	Pico Duarte (Note: The summit of Pico Duarte is the highest point of the Dominican Republic, the island of Hispaniola, and all islands of the Caribbean Sea.)	Dominican Republic	Cordillera Central	3098 m 10,164 ft	3098 m 10,164 ft	941 km 584 mi	19.0231°N 70.9977°W
15	Mount Lucania	Yukon	Saint Elias Mountains	5260 m 17,257 ft	3080 m 10,105 ft	43 km 26.7 mi	61.0215°N 140.4661°W
16	Mount Whitney	California	Sierra Nevada	4421 m 14,505 ft	3072 m 10,080 ft	2,649.47	36.5786°N 118.2920°W
17	Popocatépetl	México; Morelos; Puebla	Cordillera Neovolcanica	5410 m 17,749 ft	3040 m 9,974 ft	143 km 88.8 mi	19.0225°N 98.6278°W
18	Mount Shasta	California	Cascade Range	4321.8 m 14,179 ft	2979 m 9,772 ft	539 km 335 mi	41.4092°N 122.1949°W
19	Monarch Mountain (Note: The summit of Monarch Mountain is the highest point of the Monarch Icefield.)	British Columbia	Coast Mountains	3555 m 11,663 ft	2925 m 9,596 ft	71.4 km 44.4 mi	51.8995°N 125.8760°W
20	Shishaldin Volcano (Note: The summit of Shishaldin Volcano is the highest point of Unimak Island and the Aleutian Islands.) (Note: Shishaldin Volcano is the westernmost summit of its elevation in Alaska, the United States, and greater North America.)	Alaska	Unimak Island	2869 m 9,414 ft	2869 m 9,414 ft	877 km 545 mi	54.7554°N 163.9709°W
21	Mount Robson (Note: The summit of Mount Robson is the highest point of the Canadian Rockies.) (Note: Mount Robson is the easternmost summit of its elevation in Canada and the northernmost and westernmost summit of its elevation in the Rocky Mountains.)	British Columbia	Canadian Rockies	3959 m 12,989 ft	2829 m 9,281 ft	460 km 286 mi	53.1105°N 119.1566°W
22	Redoubt Volcano (Note: The summit of Redoubt Volcano is the highest point of the Chigmit Mountains.) (Note: Redoubt Volcano is the westernmost summit of its elevation in Alaska and greater North America.)	Alaska	Chigmit Mountains	3108 m 10,197 ft	2788 m 9,147 ft	94.5 km 58.7 mi	60.4854°N 152.7442°W
23	Mount Elbert	Colorado	Sawatch Range	4401.2 m 14,440 ft	2772 m 9,093 ft	1,079.15	39.1178°N 106.4454°W
24	Mount Sir Wilfrid Laurier (Note: The summit of Mount Sir Wilfrid Laurier is the highest point of the Cariboo Mountains.)	British Columbia	Columbia Mountains	3516 m 11,535 ft	2728 m 8,950 ft	51.7 km 32.1 mi	52.8015°N 119.7315°W
25	Nevado de Colima	Jalisco	Cordillera Neovolcanica	4270 m 14,009 ft	2720 m 8,924 ft	405 km 252 mi	19.5633°N 103.6087°W
26	Mount Vancouver	Yukon	Saint Elias Mountains	4812 m 15,787 ft	2712 m 8,898 ft	44 km 27.4 mi	60.3589°N 139.6980°W
27	Mount Sir Sandford (Note: The summit of Mount Sir Sandford is the highest point of the Columbia Mountains.)	British Columbia	Columbia Mountains	3519 m 11,545 ft	2703 m 8,868 ft	62 km 38.5 mi	51.6566°N 117.8676°W
28	Mount Baker (Note: The summit of Mount Baker is the highest point of the northern Cascade Range.) (Note: The elevation of Mount Baker includes an adjustment of +1.43 m (4.69 ft) from NGVD 29 to NAVD 88.)	Washington	Skagit Range	3287 m 10,786 ft	2696 m 8,845 ft	212 km 131.5 mi	48.7768°N 121.8145°W
29	Mount Torbert (Note: The summit of Mount Torbert is the highest point of the Tordrillo Mountains.) (Note: Mount Torbert is the westernmost summit of its elevation in Alaska and greater North America.)	Alaska	Alaska Range	3479 m 11,413 ft	2648 m 8,688 ft	157.3 km 97.7 mi	61.4086°N 152.4125°W
30	Pic la Selle (Note: The summit of Pic la Selle is the highest point of the Republic of Haiti.) (Note: Pic la Selle is the southernmost and westernmost summit of its elevation in the Caribbean.)	Haiti	Island of Hispaniola	2674 m 8,773 ft	2644 m 8,675 ft	126.6 km 78.7 mi	18.3602°N 71.9767°W
31	Barbeau Peak (Note: The summit of Barbeau Peak is the highest point of Ellesmere Island and Nunavut of Canada.) (Note: Barbeau Peak is the northernmost ultra-prominent summit of Canada and greater North America.)	Nunavut	Ellesmere Island	2616 m 8,583 ft	2616 m 8,583 ft	796 km 495 mi	81.9148°N 75.0093°W
32	San Jacinto Peak (Note: The summit of San Jacinto Peak is the highest point of the San Jacinto Mountains.)	California	San Jacinto Mountains	3302.3 m 10,834 ft	2542 m 8,339 ft	32.7 km 20.3 mi	33.8147°N 116.6794°W
33	San Gorgonio Mountain (Note: The summit of San Gorgonio Mountain is the highest point of the San Bernardino Mountains.) (Note: The elevation of San Gorgonio Mountain includes an adjustment of +1.303 m (4.27 ft) from NGVD 29 to NAVD 88.)	California	San Bernardino Mountains	3506 m 11,503 ft	2528 m 8,294 ft	262 km 162.5 mi	34.0992°N 116.8249°W
34	Charleston Peak (Note: The summit of Charleston Peak is the highest point of the Spring Mountains.) (Mount Charleston)	Nevada	Spring Mountains	3632 m 11,916 ft	2517 m 8,258 ft	218 km 135.1 mi	36.2716°N 115.6956°W
35	Mount Pavlof (Note: The summit of Mount Pavlof is the highest point of the Alaska Peninsula.)	Alaska	Alaska Peninsula	2515 m 8,250 ft	2499 m 8,200 ft	151.8 km 94.3 mi	55.4173°N 161.8932°W
35	Mount Veniaminof (Note: The summit of Mount Veniaminof is the highest point of the Alaska Peninsula.)	Alaska	Alaska Peninsula	2507 m 8,225 ft	2499 m 8,200 ft	337 km 209 mi	56.2194°N 159.2975°W
37	Mount Adams	Washington	Cascade Range	3743.4 m 12,281 ft	2480 m 8,136 ft	73.6 km 45.8 mi	46.2024°N 121.4909°W
38	Skihist Mountain (Note: The summit of Skihist Mountain is the highest point of the Lillooet Range.)	British Columbia	Coast Mountains	2968 m 9,738 ft	2458 m 8,064 ft	157.1 km 97.6 mi	50.1878°N 121.9032°W
39	Mount Hubbard	Alaska; Yukon	Saint Elias Mountains	4557 m 14,951 ft	2457 m 8,061 ft	34.4 km 21.3 mi	60.3194°N 139.0726°W
40	Mount Ratz (Note: The summit of Mount Ratz is the highest point of the Boundary Ranges.)	British Columbia	Coast Mountains	3090 m 10,138 ft	2430 m 7,972 ft	311 km 193.4 mi	57.3930°N 132.3031°W
41	Mount Odin (Note: The summit of Mount Odin is the highest point of the Gold Range.)	British Columbia	Columbia Mountains	2971 m 9,747 ft	2409 m 7,904 ft	65.4 km 40.7 mi	50.5518°N 118.1293°W
42	Mount Isto (Note: The summit of Mount Isto is the highest point of the Brooks Range.) (Note: Mount Isto is the northernmost ultra-prominent summit of Alaska and the United States.)	Alaska	Brooks Range	2736 m 8,976 ft	2408 m 7,901 ft	634 km 394 mi	69.2025°N 143.8020°W
43	Mount Monashee (Note: The summit of Mount Monashee is the highest point of the Monashee Mountains.)	British Columbia	Columbia Mountains	3274 m 10,741 ft	2404 m 7,887 ft	51.8 km 32.2 mi	52.3853°N 118.9399°W
44	Iliamna Volcano (Note: Iliamna Volcano is the westernmost 3000-meter (9843-foot) summit of Alaska and greater North America.)	Alaska	Chigmit Mountains	3053 m 10,016 ft	2398 m 7,866 ft	54.1 km 33.6 mi	60.0321°N 153.0915°W
45	Mount Olympus (Note: The summit of Mount Olympus is the highest point of the Olympic Mountains.)	Washington	Olympic Mountains	2432.3 m 7,980 ft	2389 m 7,838 ft	173.7 km 108 mi	47.8013°N 123.7108°W
46	Mount Columbia (Note: Mount Columbia on the Great Divide between British Columbia and Alberta is the highest point of the Columbia Icefield, the Province of Alberta, and the entire Beaufort Sea Drainage basin.)	Alberta; British Columbia	Canadian Rockies	3741 m 12,274 ft	2371 m 7,779 ft	158 km 98.2 mi	52.1473°N 117.4416°W
47	Mount Queen Bess (Note: The summit of Mount Queen Bess is the highest point of the Homathko Icefield.)	British Columbia	Coast Mountains	3298 m 10,820 ft	2355 m 7,726 ft	45.5 km 28.2 mi	51.2714°N 124.5682°W
48	Mount Cook	Alaska; Yukon	Saint Elias Mountains	4194 m 13,760 ft	2350 m 7,710 ft	23.4 km 14.54 mi	60.1816°N 139.9811°W
49	Mount Hood (Note: The summit of Mount Hood is the highest point of the Oregon Cascades and the U.S. State of Oregon.)	Oregon	Cascade Range	3428.8 m 11,249 ft	2349 m 7,706 ft	92.2 km 57.3 mi	45.3735°N 121.6959°W
50	Mount Sanford	Alaska	Wrangell Mountains	4949 m 16,237 ft	2343 m 7,687 ft	64.8 km 40.3 mi	62.2132°N 144.1292°W

== Most isolated major summits ==
Of the 50 most isolated major summits of greater North America, only Denali exceeds 4000 kilometers (2485 miles) of topographic isolation, Gunnbjørn Fjeld exceeds 3000 kilometers (1864 miles), four peaks exceed 2000 kilometers (1243 miles), nine peaks exceed 1000 kilometers (621.4 miles), 35 peaks exceed 500 kilometers (310.7 miles), and all 50 peaks exceed 392 kilometers (243.6 miles) of topographic isolation.

Of these 50 peaks, 16 are located in Canada, 15 in the United States, 7 in Greenland, 6 in México, and one each in the Dominican Republic, Costa Rica, Guatemala, Guadeloupe, Puerto Rico, and Cuba.

The 50 most topographically isolated summits of greater North America with at least 500 meters of topographic prominence
Rank	Mountain peak	Region	Mountain range	Elevation	Prominence	Isolation	Location
1	Denali	Alaska	Alaska Range	6190.5 m 20,310 ft	6141 m 20,146 ft	7,450.24	63.0690°N 151.0063°W
2	Gunnbjørn Fjeld	Greenland	Island of Greenland	3694 m 12,119 ft	3694 m 12,119 ft	3,254.13	68.9184°N 29.8991°W
3	Pico de Orizaba (Citlaltépetl)	Puebla; Veracruz	Cordillera Neovolcanica	5636 m 18,491 ft	4922 m 16,148 ft	2,690.14	19.0305°N 97.2698°W
4	Mount Whitney	California	Sierra Nevada	4421 m 14,505 ft	3072 m 10,080 ft	2,649.47	36.5786°N 118.2920°W
5	Mount Mitchell (Note: The summit of Mount Mitchell is the highest point of the Appalachian Mountains, the State of North Carolina, and the eastern United States.) (Note: Mount Mitchell is the easternmost 2000-meter (6562-foot) summit of the United States.) (Note: The elevation of Mount Mitchell includes an adjustment of +0.025 m (0.08 ft) from NGVD 29 to NAVD 88.)	North Carolina	Blue Ridge Mountains	2037 m 6,684 ft	1857 m 6,092 ft	1,913.49	35.7649°N 82.2651°W
6	Mount Washington (Note: The summit of Mount Washington is the highest point of the White Mountains, the State of New Hampshire, and the northeastern United States.) (Note: Mount Washington is the easternmost ultra-prominent summit of the United States.) (Note: The elevation of Mount Washington includes an adjustment of +0.02 m (0.07 ft) from NGVD 29 to NAVD 88.)	New Hampshire	White Mountains	1917 m 6,288 ft	1877 m 6,158 ft	1,318.95	44.2705°N 71.3032°W
7	Mount Rainier	Washington	Cascade Range	4394 m 14,417 ft	4026 m 13,210 ft	1,176.72	46.8529°N 121.7604°W
8	Mount Elbert	Colorado	Sawatch Range	4401.2 m 14,440 ft	2772 m 9,093 ft	1,079.15	39.1178°N 106.4454°W
9	Pico Duarte	Dominican Republic	Cordillera Central	3098 m 10,164 ft	3098 m 10,164 ft	941 km 584 mi	19.0231°N 70.9977°W
10	Chirripó Grande (Cerro Chirripó)	Costa Rica	Cordillera de Talamanca	3819 m 12,530 ft	3755 m 12,320 ft	878 km 546 mi	9.4843°N 83.4889°W
11	Shishaldin Volcano	Alaska	Unimak Island	2869 m 9,414 ft	2869 m 9,414 ft	877 km 545 mi	54.7554°N 163.9709°W
12	Barbeau Peak	Nunavut	Ellesmere Island	2616 m 8,583 ft	2616 m 8,583 ft	796 km 495 mi	81.9148°N 75.0093°W
13	Mount Caubvick (Note: The summit of Mount Caubvick is the highest point of the Torngat Mountains, the Province of Newfoundland and Labrador, and all of eastern Canada.) (Mont d'Iberville)	Newfoundland and Labrador	Torngat Mountains	1652 m 5,420 ft	1367 m 4,485 ft	791 km 492 mi	58.8878°N 63.7098°W
14	Volcán Tajumulco	Guatemala	Sierra de las Nubes	4220 m 13,845 ft	3990 m 13,091 ft	722 km 448 mi	15.0430°N 91.9037°W
15	Melville Island High Point	Nunavut	Melville Island	762 m 2,500 ft	762 m 2,500 ft	717 km 445 mi	75.3694°N 115.0827°W
16	La Grande Soufrière (Note: The summit of La Grande Soufrière is the highest point of île de Basse-Terre and the French Région Guadeloupe.) (Note: La Grande Soufrière is the southernmost and easternmost summit of its elevation in the Caribbean.)	Guadeloupe	île de Basse-Terre	1467 m 4,813 ft	1467 m 4,813 ft	699 km 434 mi	16.0449°N 61.6638°W
17	Tanaga Volcano (Note: The summit of Tanaga Volcano is the highest point of Tanaga Island and the Andreanof Islands.) (Note: Tanaga Volcano is the westernmost summit of its elevation in Alaska, the United States, and greater North America.)	Alaska	Tanaga Island	1806 m 5,925 ft	1806 m 5,925 ft	656 km 407 mi	51.8838°N 178.1429°W
18	Avannaarsua High Point (Note: The apex of Avannaarsua is the northernmost and westernmost summit of its elevation in Greenland.)	Greenland	Island of Greenland	2600 m 8,530 ft	500 m 1,640 ft	636 km 395 mi	77.5000°N 47.6167°W
19	Mount Isto	Alaska	Brooks Range	2736 m 8,976 ft	2408 m 7,901 ft	634 km 394 mi	69.2025°N 143.8020°W
20	Cerro San Rafael (Note: The summit of Cerro San Rafael is the highest point of Sierra Madre Oriental and Estado Libre y Soberano de Coahuila.) (Note: Cerro San Rafael is the northernmost summit of its elevation in México.)	Coahuila	Sierra Madre Oriental	3730 m 12,238 ft	1410 m 4,626 ft	628 km 390 mi	25.3637°N 100.5571°W
21	Mathiassen Mountain (Note: The summit of Mathiassen Mountain is the highest point of Southampton Island.)	Nunavut	Southampton Island	625 m 2,051 ft	625 m 2,051 ft	627 km 390 mi	64.7403°N 83.1573°W
22	Mount Logan	Yukon	Saint Elias Mountains	5956 m 19,541 ft	5247 m 17,215 ft	623 km 387 mi	60.5671°N 140.4055°W
23	Angilaaq Mountain (Note: The summit of Angilaaq Mountain is the highest point of Bylot Island.)	Nunavut	Bylot Island	1944 m 6,378 ft	1944 m 6,378 ft	622 km 387 mi	73.2298°N 78.6230°W
24	Signal Hill (Note: The summit of Signal Hill is the highest point of the Ouachita Mountains and the U.S. State of Arkansas.) (Note: The elevation of Signal Hill includes an adjustment of +0.075 m (0.25 ft) from NGVD 29 to NAVD 88.) (Mount Magazine)	Arkansas	Ouachita Mountains	839 m 2,753 ft	653 m 2,143 ft	613 km 381 mi	35.1671°N 93.6447°W
25	Mount Odin (Note: The summit of Mount Odin is the highest point of Baffin Island.) (Note: Mount Odin is the easternmost summit of its elevation in Canada.)	Nunavut	Baffin Island	2143 m 7,031 ft	2143 m 7,031 ft	586 km 364 mi	66.5468°N 65.4289°W
26	Cerro El Potosí (Note: The summit of Cerro El Potosí is the highest point of Estado Libre y Soberano de Nuevo León.)	Nuevo León	Sierra Madre Oriental	3720 m 12,205 ft	1875 m 6,152 ft	571 km 355 mi	24.8719°N 100.2327°W
27	Mount Waddington	British Columbia	Coast Mountains	4019 m 13,186 ft	3289 m 10,791 ft	562 km 349 mi	51.3737°N 125.2636°W
28	Melville Hills High Point	Northwest Territories	Melville Hills	876 m 2,875 ft	500 m 1,640 ft	551 km 342 mi	69.2425°N 121.5391°W
29	Keele Peak (Note: The summit of Keele Peak is the highest point of the Mackenzie Mountains.) (Note: Keele Peak is the northernmost summit of its elevation in Canada.)	Yukon	Mackenzie Mountains	2952 m 9,685 ft	2161 m 7,090 ft	543 km 337 mi	63.4314°N 130.3243°W
30	Mount Shasta	California	Cascade Range	4321.8 m 14,179 ft	2979 m 9,772 ft	539 km 335 mi	41.4092°N 122.1949°W
31	Perserajoq	Greenland	Island of Greenland	2259 m 7,411 ft	2009 m 6,591 ft	527 km 328 mi	71.4000°N 51.9667°W
32	Mealy Mountains High Point (Note: Mealy Mountains High Point is the easternmost 1000-meter (3281-foot) summit of Canada.)	Newfoundland and Labrador	Mealy Mountains	1190 m 3,904 ft	832 m 2,728 ft	519 km 323 mi	53.6465°N 58.5536°W
33	Peary Land High Point (Note: The apex of Peary Land is the northernmost summit of its elevation of Greenland and greater North America.)	Greenland	Island of Greenland	1910 m 6,266 ft	500 m 1,640 ft	509 km 317 mi	83.3167°N 35.3333°W
34	The Cabox (Note: The summit of The Cabox is the highest point of the island of Newfoundland.) (Note: The Cabox is the easternmost summit of its elevation in Canada.)	Newfoundland and Labrador	Island of Newfoundland	812 m 2,664 ft	812 m 2,664 ft	501 km 311 mi	48.8331°N 58.4843°W
35	Volcán Everman (Note: The summit of Volcán Everman is the highest point of Isla Socorro.)	Colima	Isla Socorro	1050 m 3,445 ft	1050 m 3,445 ft	500 km 311 mi	18.8000°N 110.9833°W
36	Greenland Ice Sheet High Point (Note: The apex of the Greenland Ice Sheet is the northernmost 3000-meter (9843-foot) summit of Greenland and greater North America.)	Greenland	Island of Greenland	3238 m 10,623 ft	500 m 1,640 ft	476 km 296 mi	72.4667°N 37.1000°W
37	Gannett Peak	Wyoming	Wind River Range	4209.1 m 13,809 ft	2157 m 7,076 ft	467 km 290 mi	43.1842°N 109.6542°W
38	Mont Yapeitso (Note: The summit of Mont Yapeitso is the highest point of the Monts Otish.)	Quebec	Monts Otish	1135 m 3,725 ft	500 m 1,640 ft	467 km 290 mi	52.3223°N 70.4451°W
39	Mount Robson	British Columbia	Canadian Rockies	3959 m 12,989 ft	2829 m 9,281 ft	460 km 286 mi	53.1105°N 119.1566°W
40	Mount Osborn (Note: The summit of Mount Osborn is the highest point of the Seward Peninsula.)	Alaska	Seward Peninsula	1437 m 4,714 ft	1334 m 4,377 ft	453 km 282 mi	64.9922°N 165.3294°W
41	Mount Igikpak (Note: The summit of Mount Igikpak is the highest point of the Schwatka Mountains.)	Alaska	Brooks Range	2523 m 8,276 ft	1867 m 6,126 ft	453 km 282 mi	67.4129°N 154.9656°W
42	Ulysses Mountain (Note: The summit of Ulysses Mountain is the highest point of the Far Northern Rockies.) (Note: Ulysses Mountain is the northernmost 3000-metre (9843-foot) summit of the Rocky Mountains.) (Mount Ulysses)	British Columbia	Muskwa Ranges	3024 m 9,921 ft	2294 m 7,526 ft	436 km 271 mi	57.3464°N 124.0928°W
43	Cerro de Punta (Note: The summit of Cerro de Punta is the highest point of the island and Commonwealth of Puerto Rico.)	Puerto Rico	Island of Puerto Rico	1338 m 4,389 ft	1338 m 4,389 ft	432 km 268 mi	18.1722°N 66.5917°W
44	Cerro Gordo (Note: The summit of Cerro Gordo is the highest point of the Sierra Madre Occidental and Estado Libre y Soberano de Durango.) (Note: Cerro Gordo is the westernmost summit of its elevation in México.)	Durango	Sierra Madre Occidental	3357 m 11,014 ft	1387 m 4,551 ft	424 km 263 mi	23.2060°N 104.9442°W
45	Pico San Juan (Note: Pico San Juan is the northernmost and westernmost 1000-meter (3281-foot) summit of the Caribbean.)	Cuba	Island of Cuba	1140 m 3,740 ft	500 m 1,640 ft	408 km 253 mi	21.9853°N 80.1327°W
46	Mont Jacques-Cartier (Note: The summit of Mont Jacques-Cartier is the highest point of the Canadian Appalachians.) (Note: Mont Jacques-Cartier is the southernmost summit of its elevation in Canada.)	Quebec	Chic-Choc Mountains	1268 m 4,160 ft	1093 m 3,585 ft	406 km 252 mi	48.9879°N 65.9483°W
47	Nevado de Colima	Jalisco	Cordillera Neovolcanica	4270 m 14,009 ft	2720 m 8,924 ft	405 km 252 mi	19.5633°N 103.6087°W
48	Sukkertoppen (Note: Sukkertoppen is the westernmost summit of its elevation in Greenland.)	Greenland	Island of Greenland	2440 m 8,005 ft	500 m 1,640 ft	401 km 249 mi	66.2000°N 52.3500°W
49	Humphreys Peak (Note: The summit of Humphreys Peak is the highest point of the San Francisco Peaks and the U.S. State of Arizona.) (Note: The elevation of Humphreys Peak includes an adjustment of +1.345 m (4.41 ft) from NGVD 29 to NAVD 88.)	Arizona	San Francisco Peaks	3852 m 12,637 ft	1841 m 6,039 ft	396 km 246 mi	35.3464°N 111.6780°W
50	Haffner Bjerg (Note: Haffner Bjerg is the westernmost 1000-meter (3281-foot) summit in Greenland.)	Greenland	Island of Greenland	1050 m 3,445 ft	500 m 1,640 ft	393 km 244 mi	76.3426°N 62.3453°W

== Gallery ==
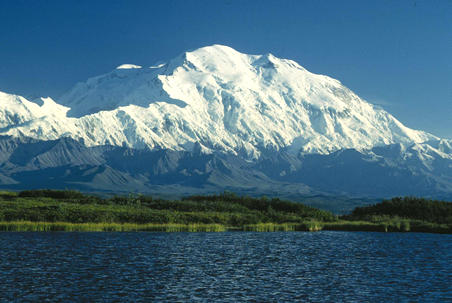
Denali in Alaska is the highest summit of the United States and North America.

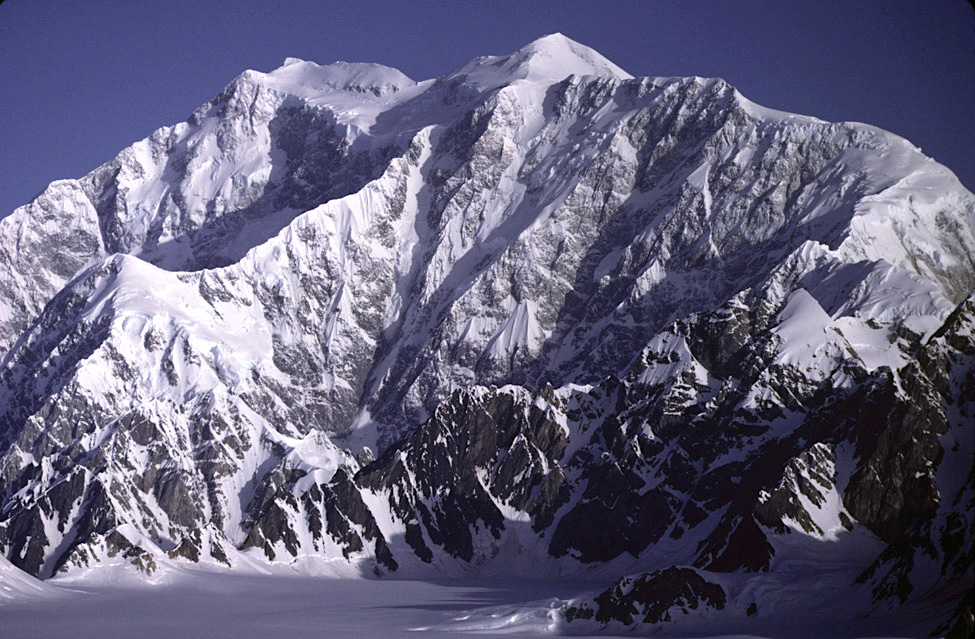
Mount Logan in Yukon is the highest summit of Canada.

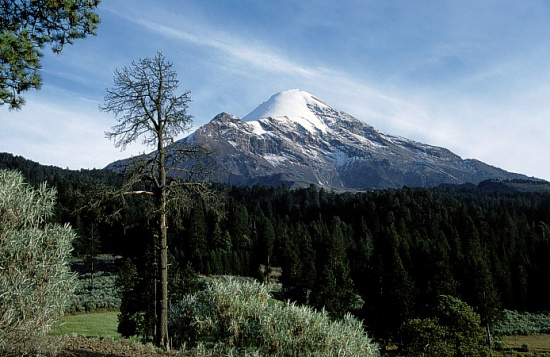
Pico de Orizaba is the highest summit of México.

Mount Saint Elias is the second highest summit of both Canada and the United States.

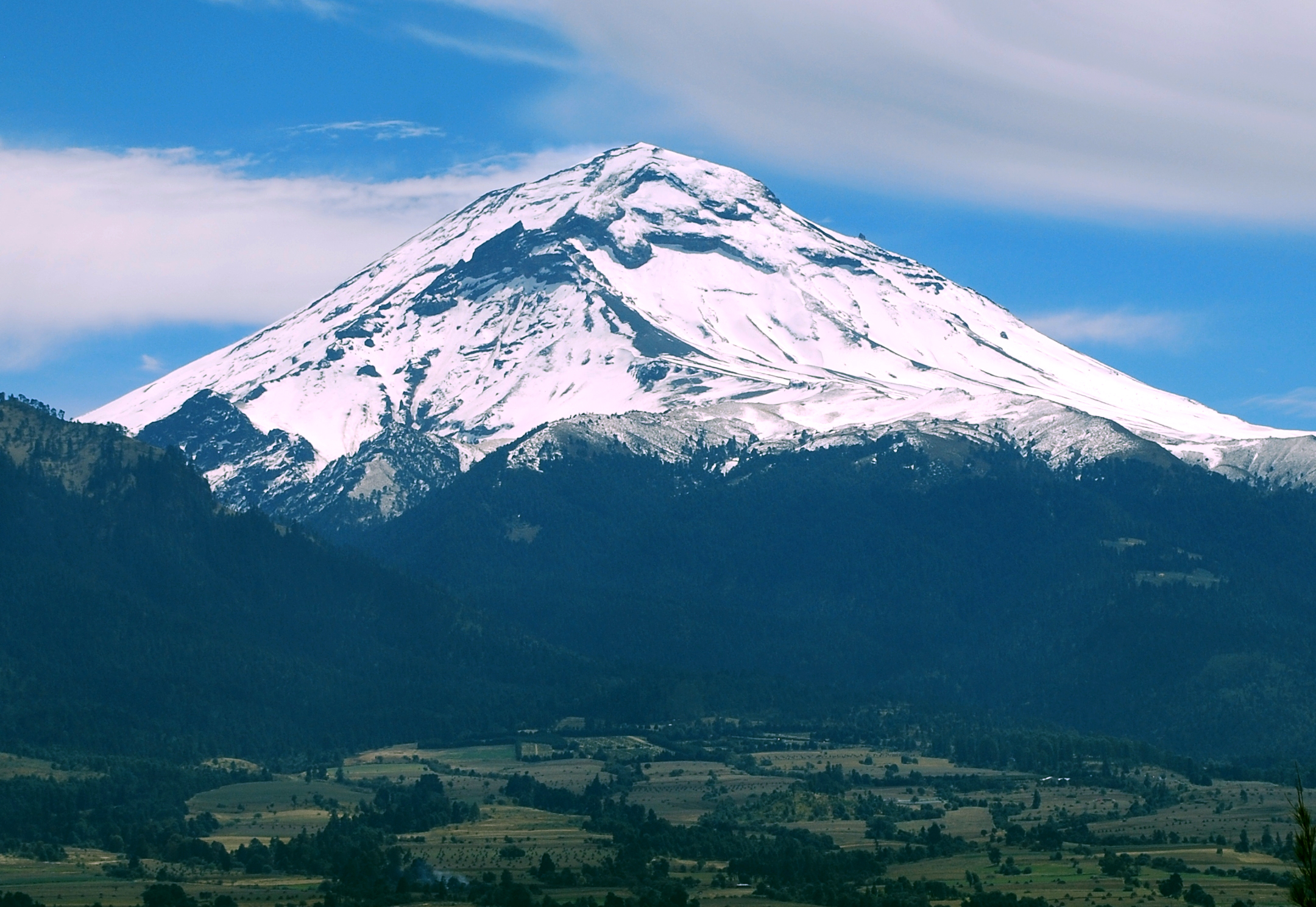
Popocatépetl is the second highest summit of México.

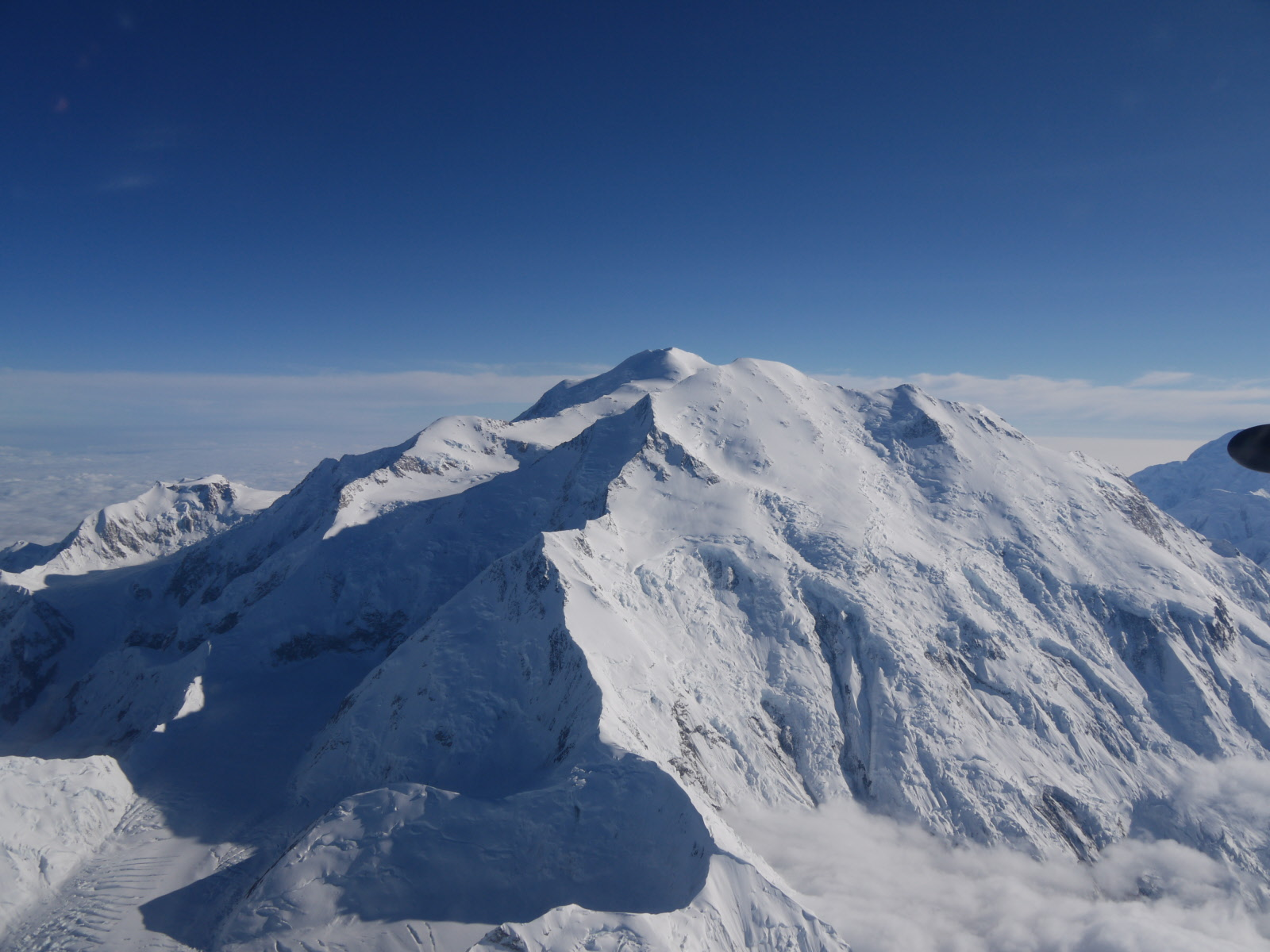
Mount Foraker is the second highest major summit of the Alaska Range.

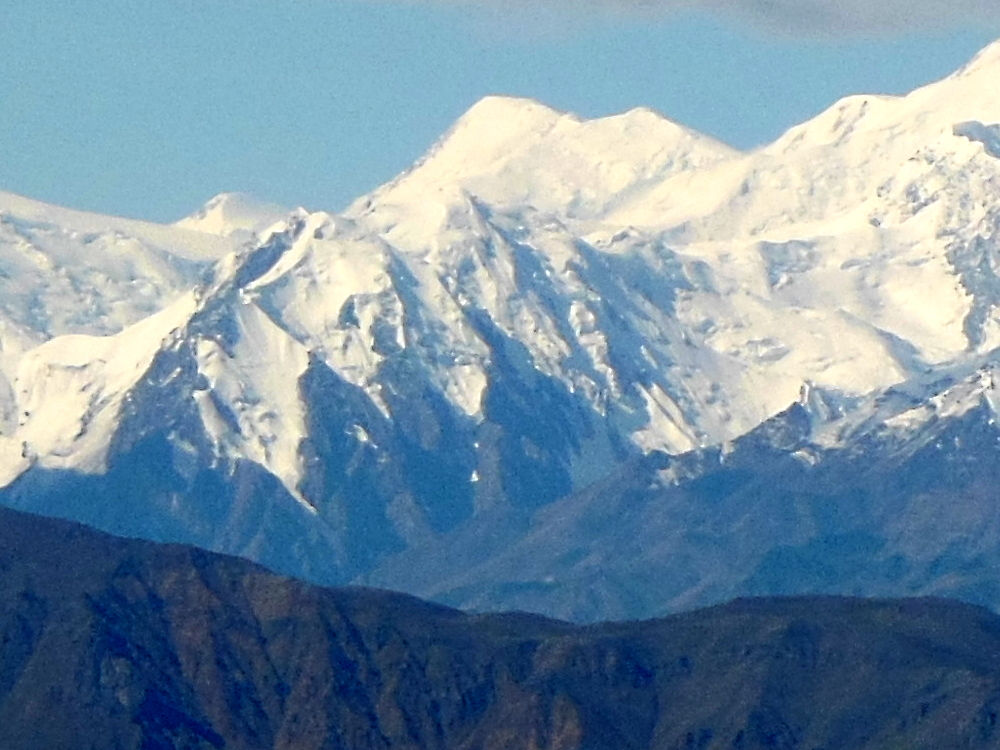
Mount Lucania in Yukon is the highest summit of the northern Saint Elias Mountains.

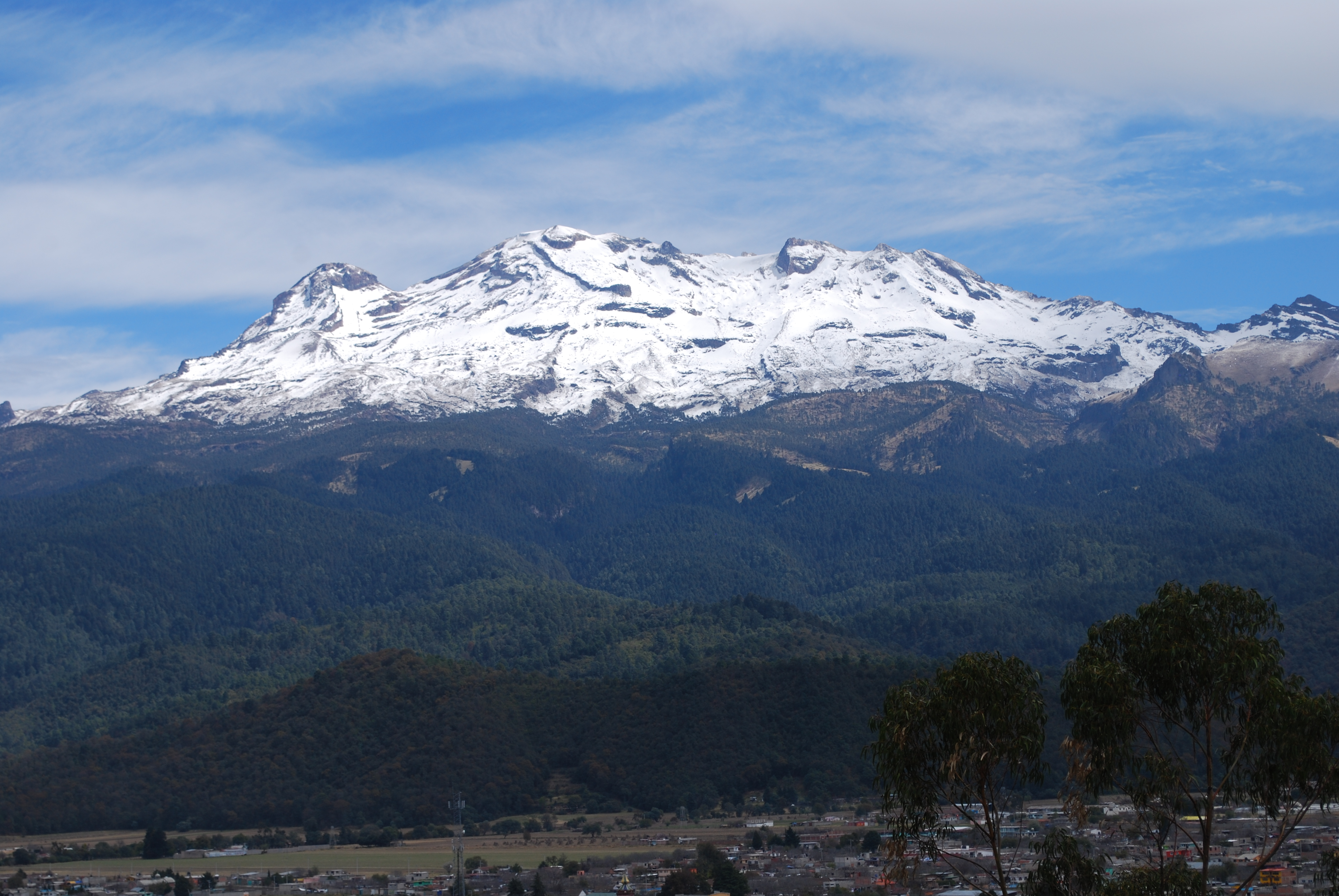
Iztaccihuatl is the third highest summit of México.

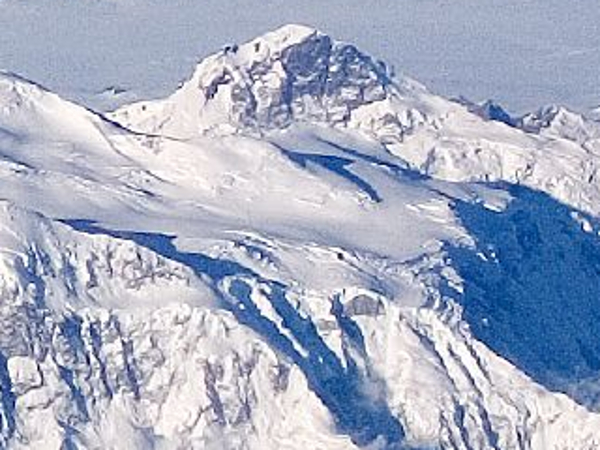
King Peak in Yukon is the fourth highest summit of Canada.

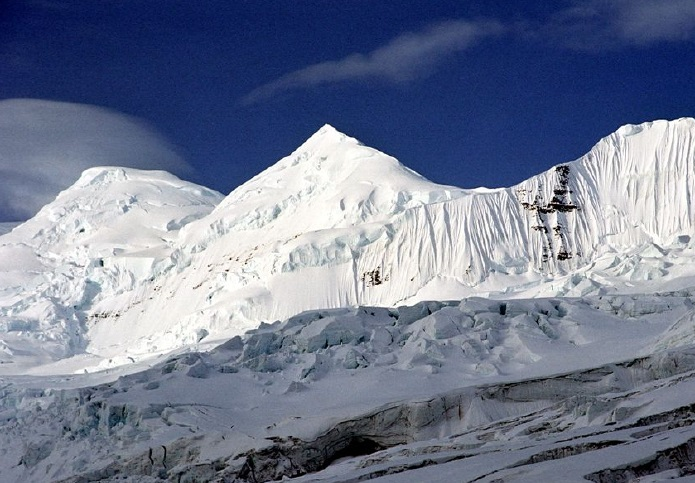
Mount Bona in Alaska is the highest volcano in the United States.

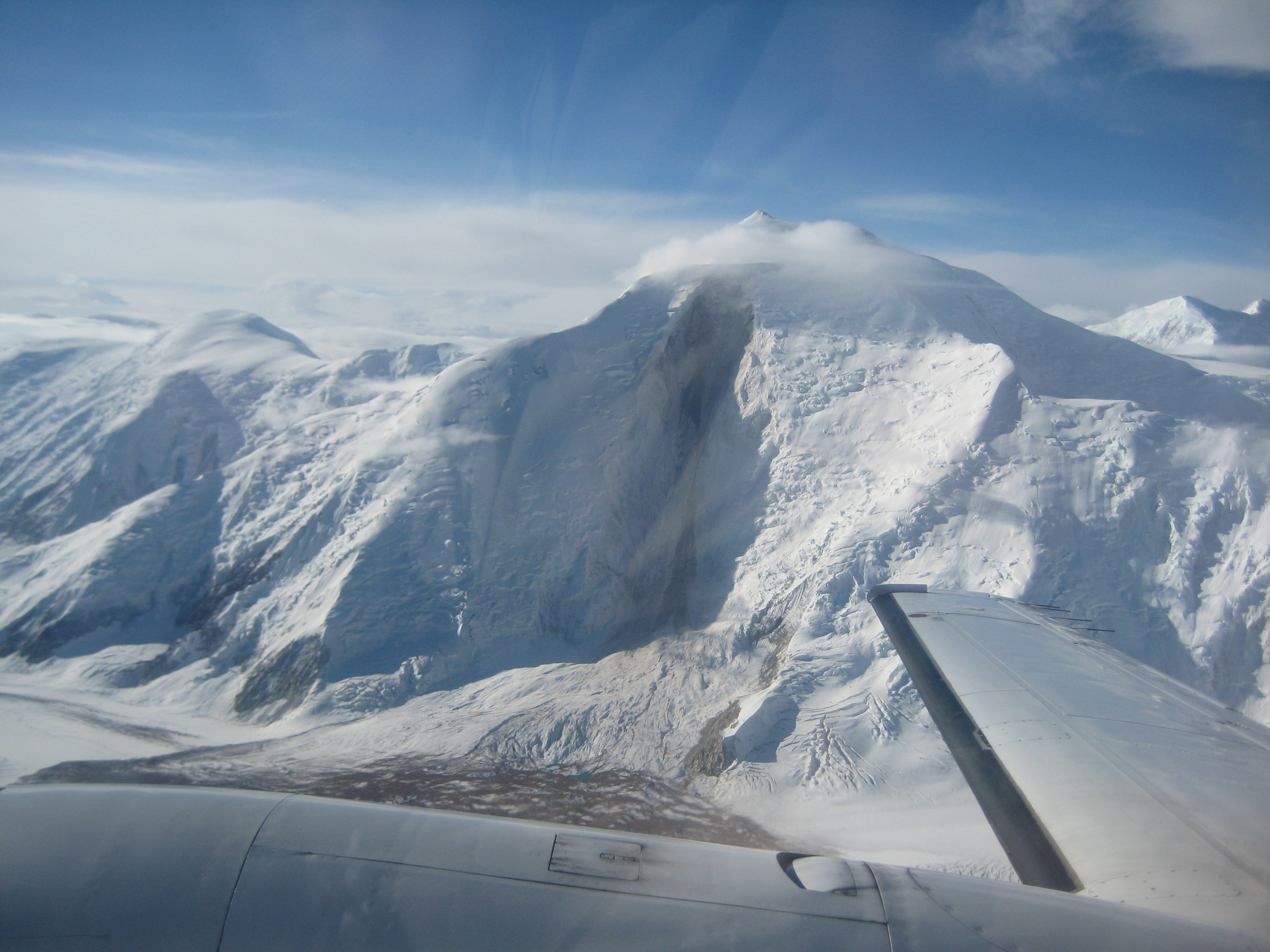
Mount Steele in Yukon is the fifth highest summit of Canada.

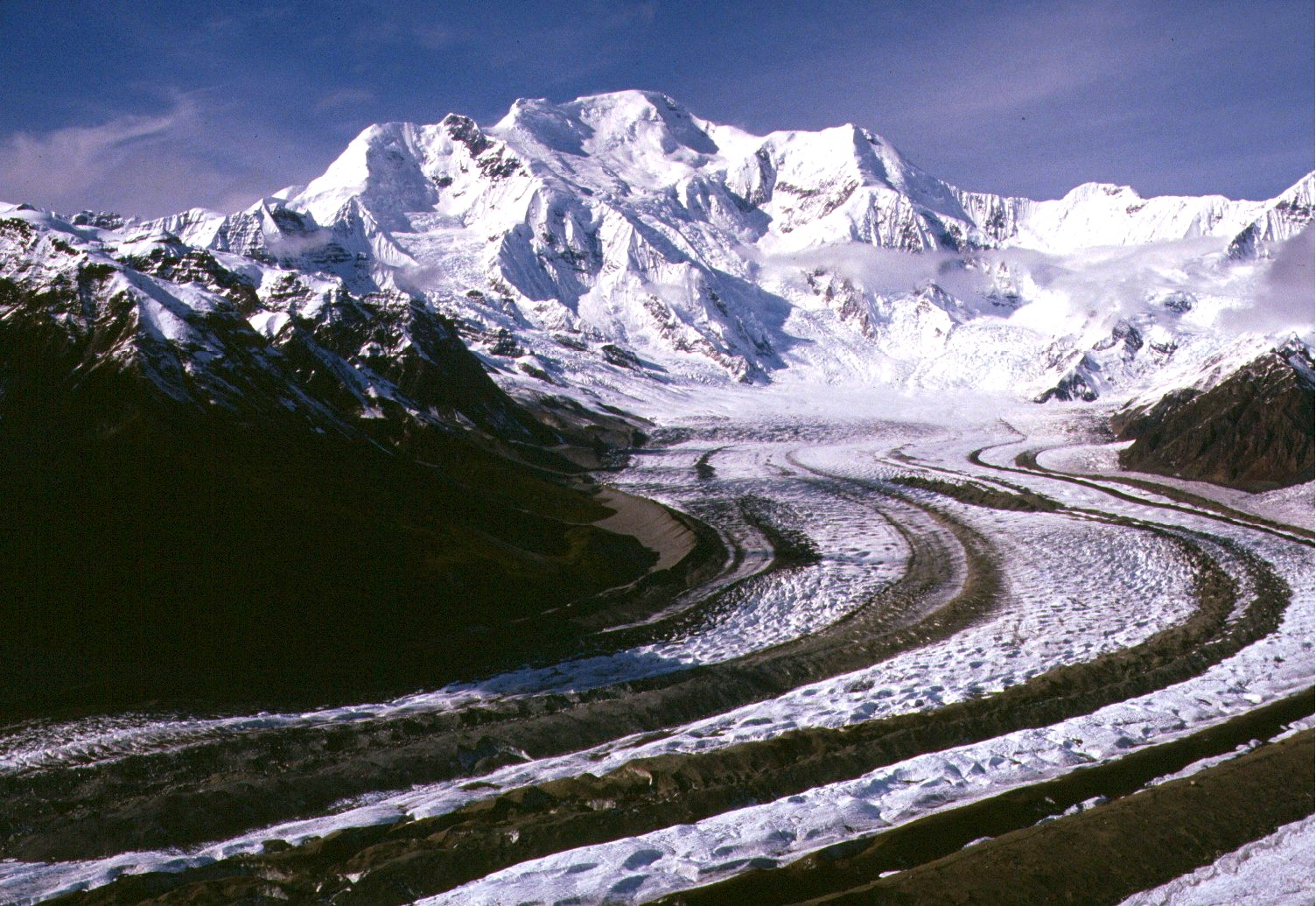
Mount Blackburn in Alaska is the highest summit of the Wrangell Mountains.

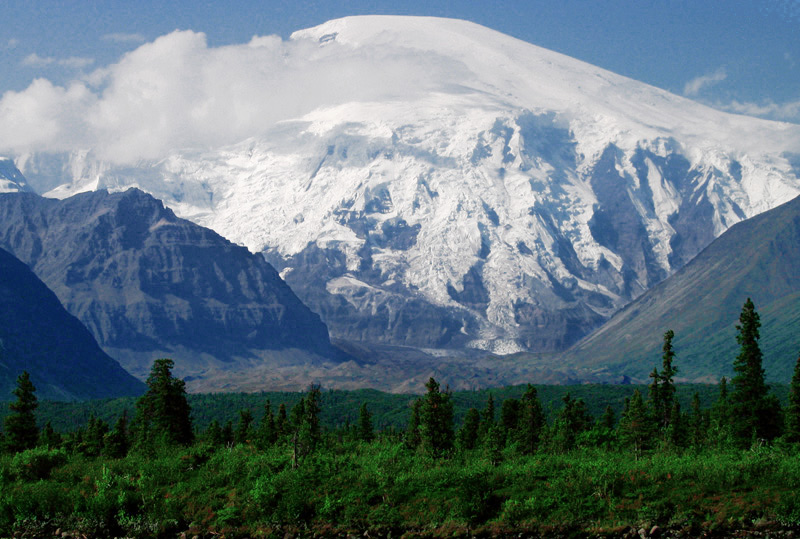
Mount Sanford in Alaska is the third highest volcano in the United States.

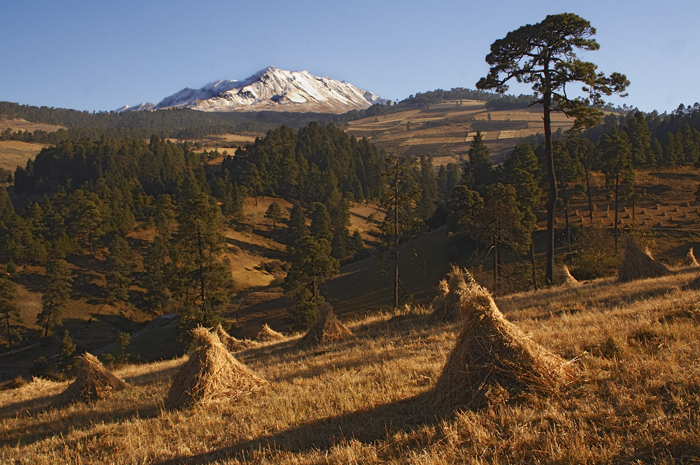
Nevado de Toluca is the fourth highest summit of México.

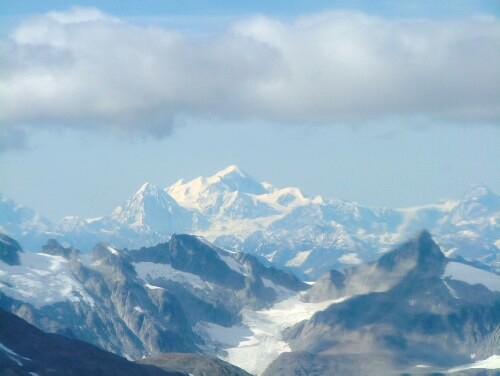
Mount Fairweather on the Alaska border is the highest summit of British Columbia.

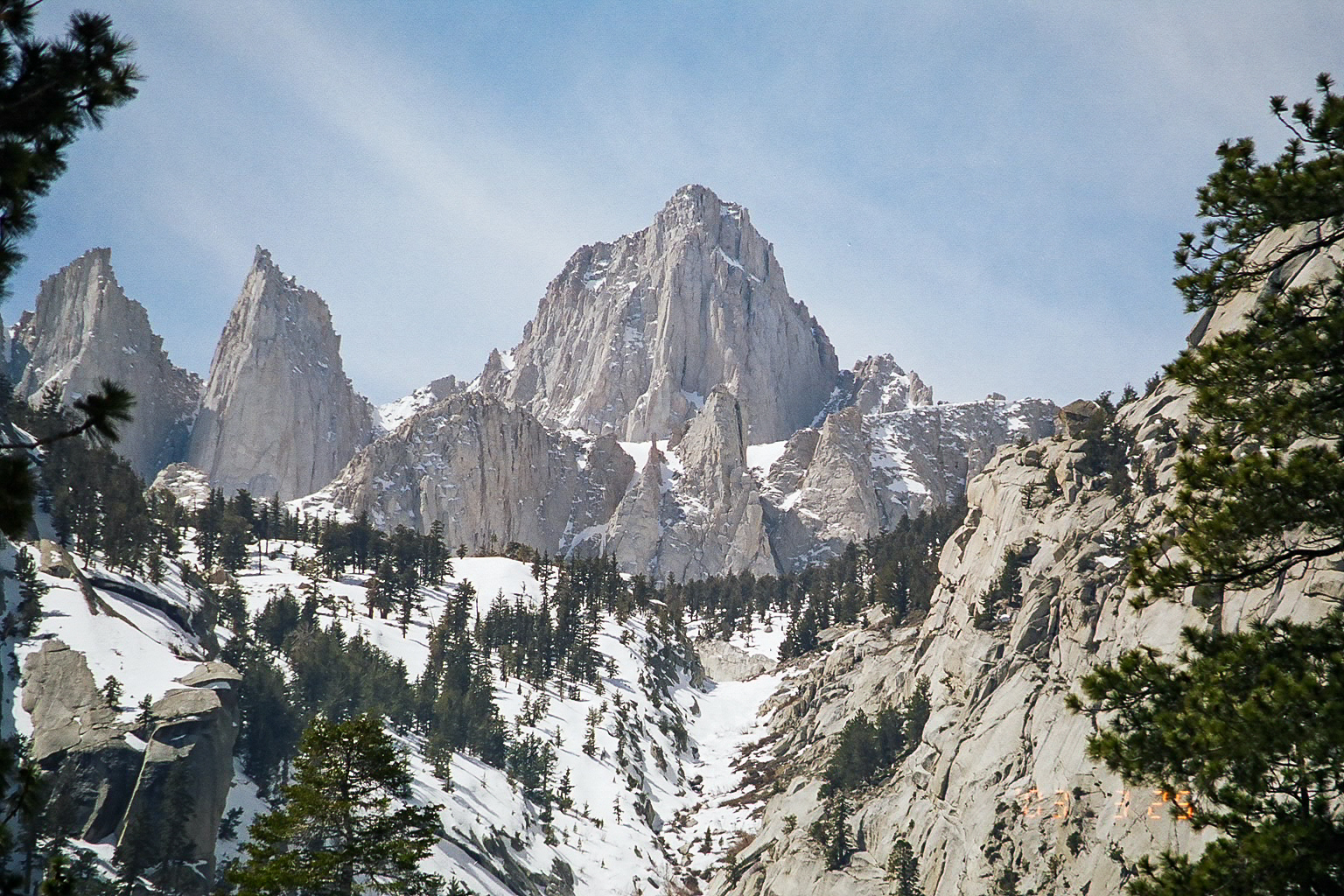
Mount Whitney highest summit of the Sierra Nevada and California.

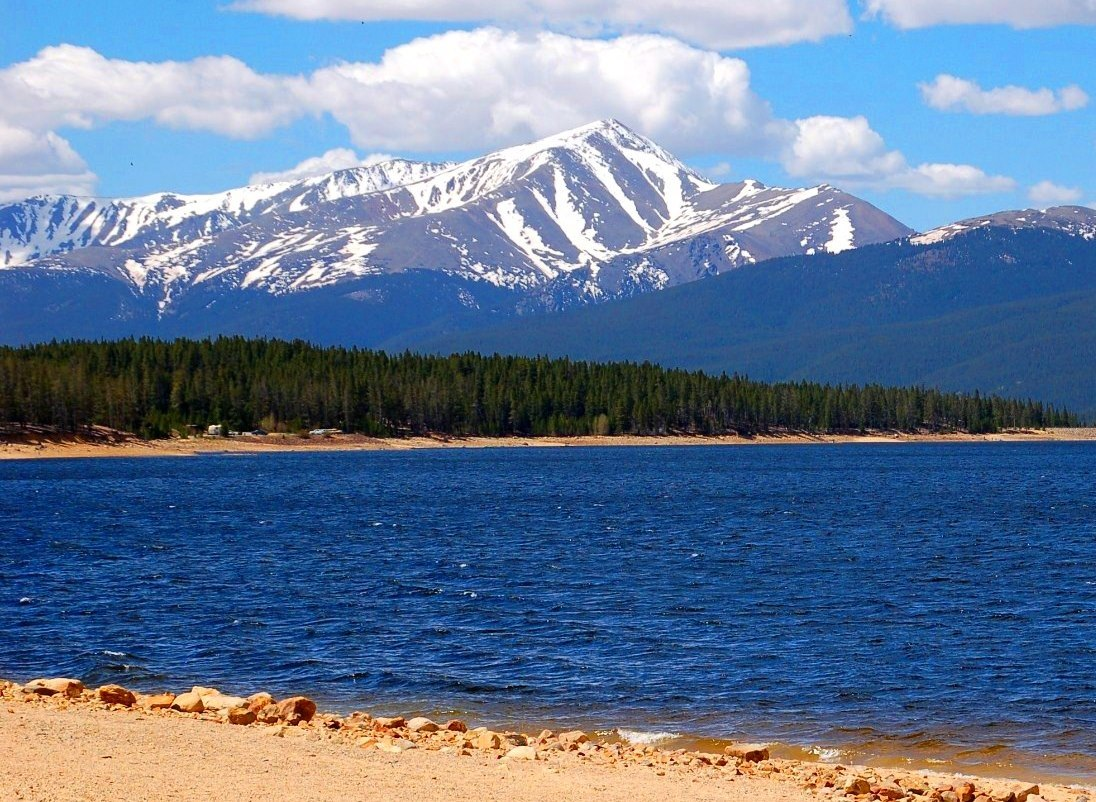
Mount Elbert is the highest summit of Colorado and the Rocky Mountains.

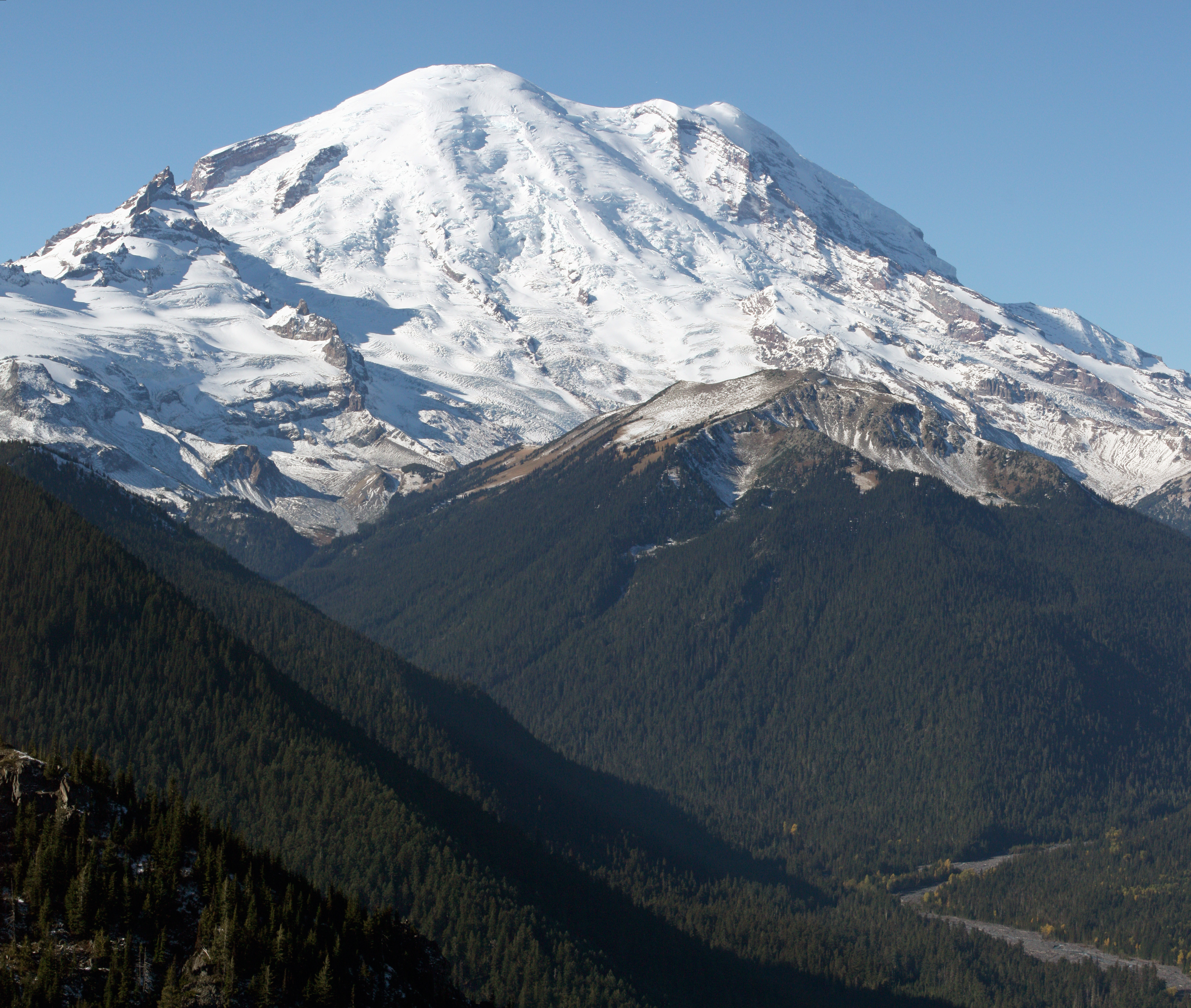
Mount Rainier is the highest summit of Washington and the Cascade Range.

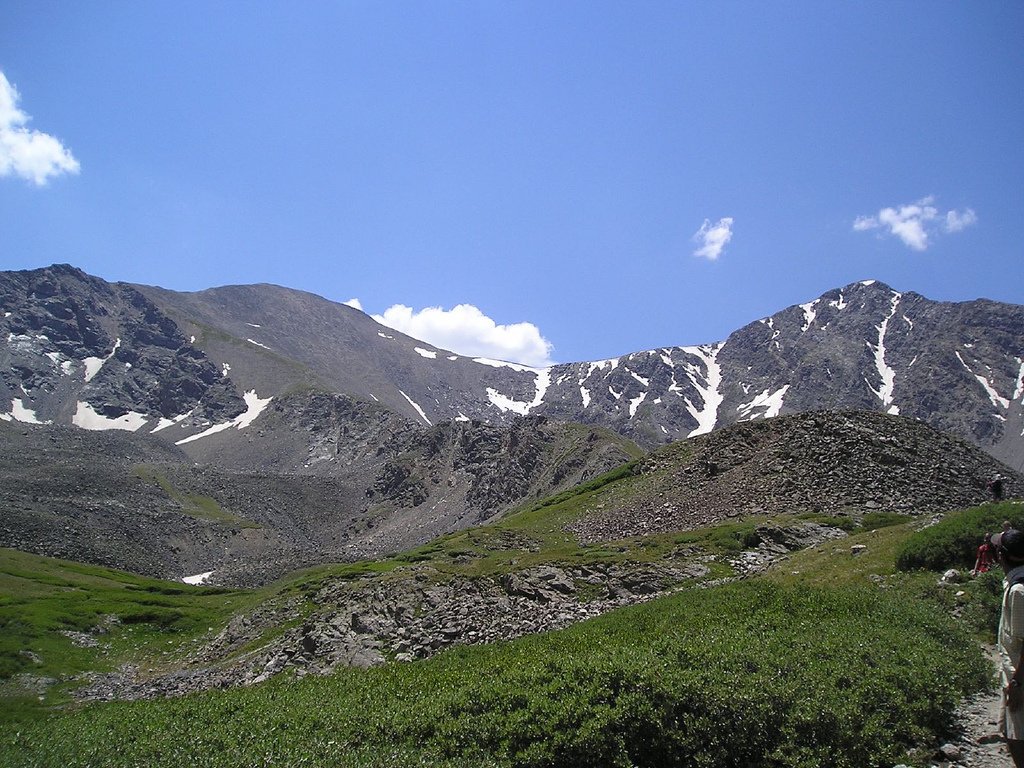
Grays Peak in Colorado is the highest point on the Continental Divide in North America.

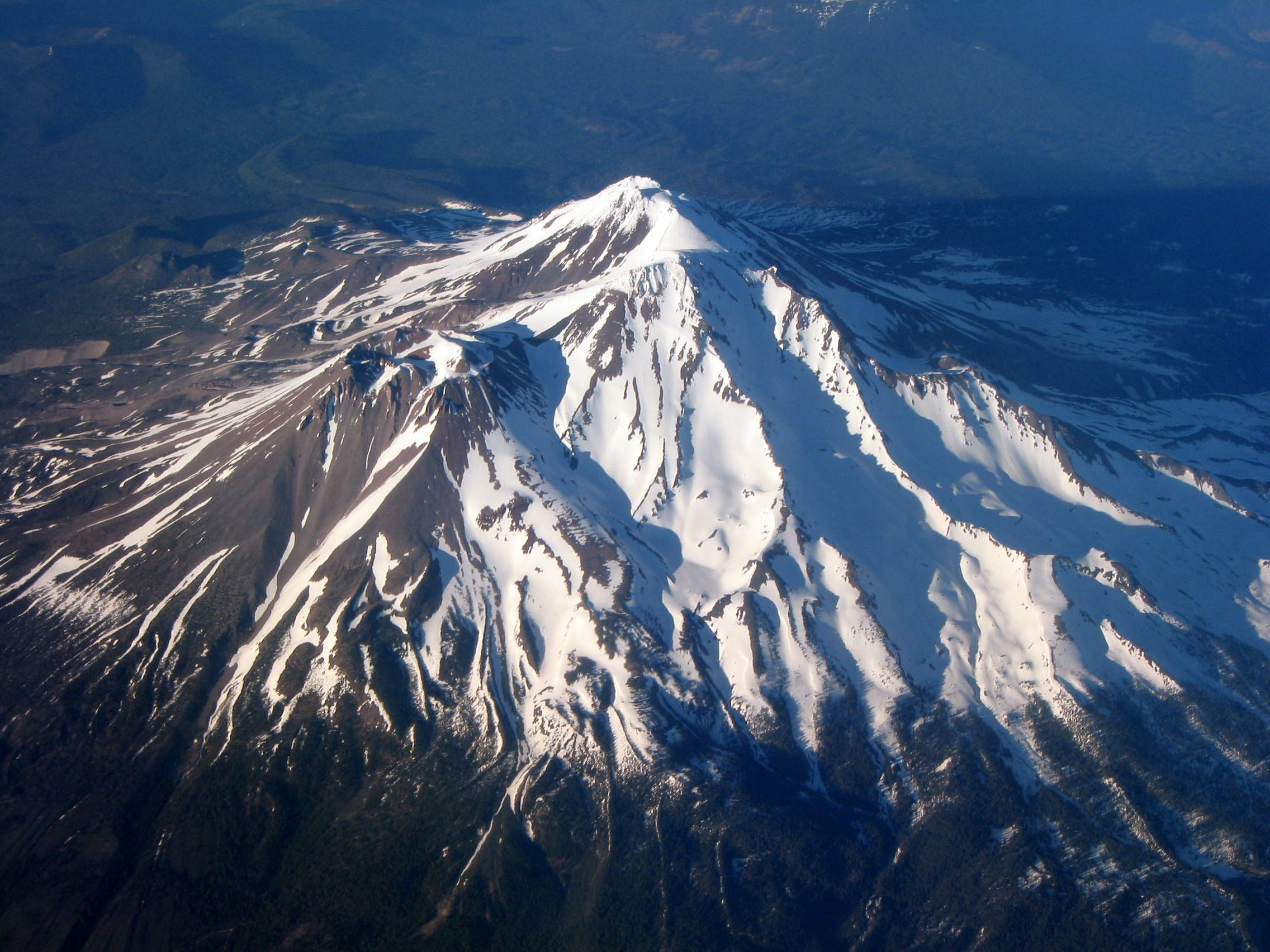
Mount Shasta in California is the highest summit of the southern Cascade Range.

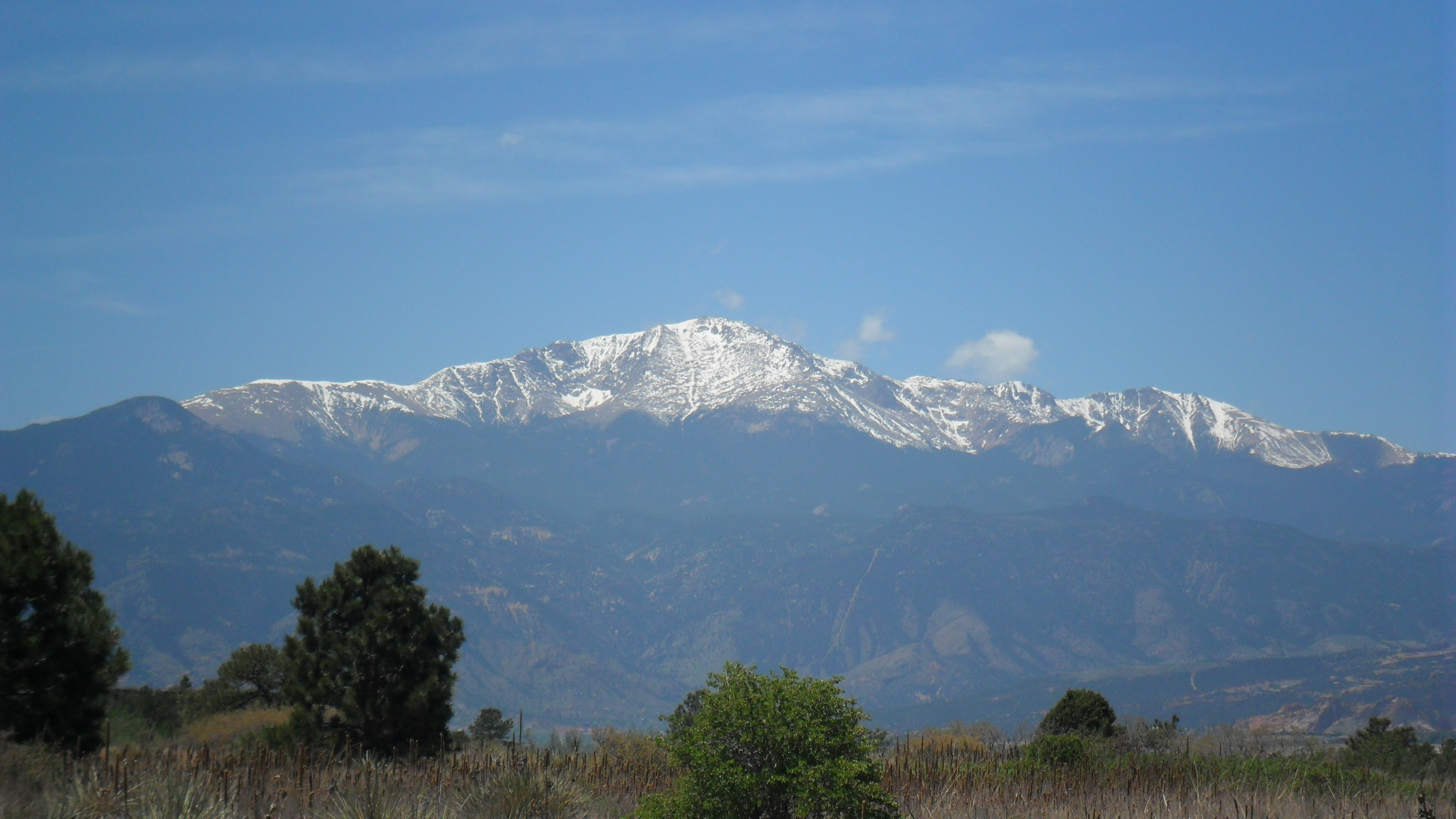
Pikes Peak in Colorado was the inspiration for America the Beautiful.

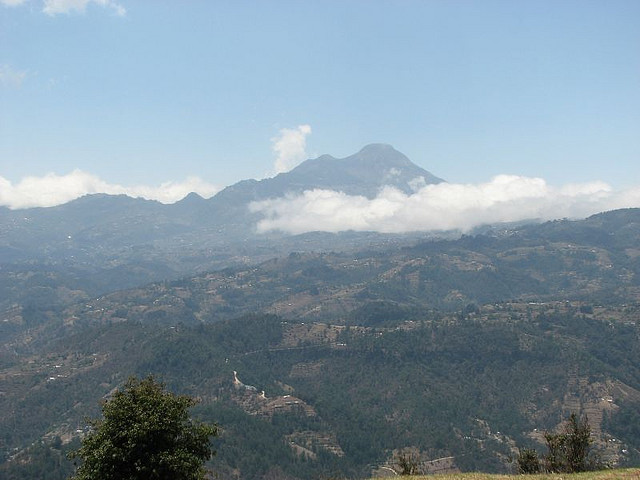
Volcán Tajumulco is the highest summit in Guatemala and all of Central America.

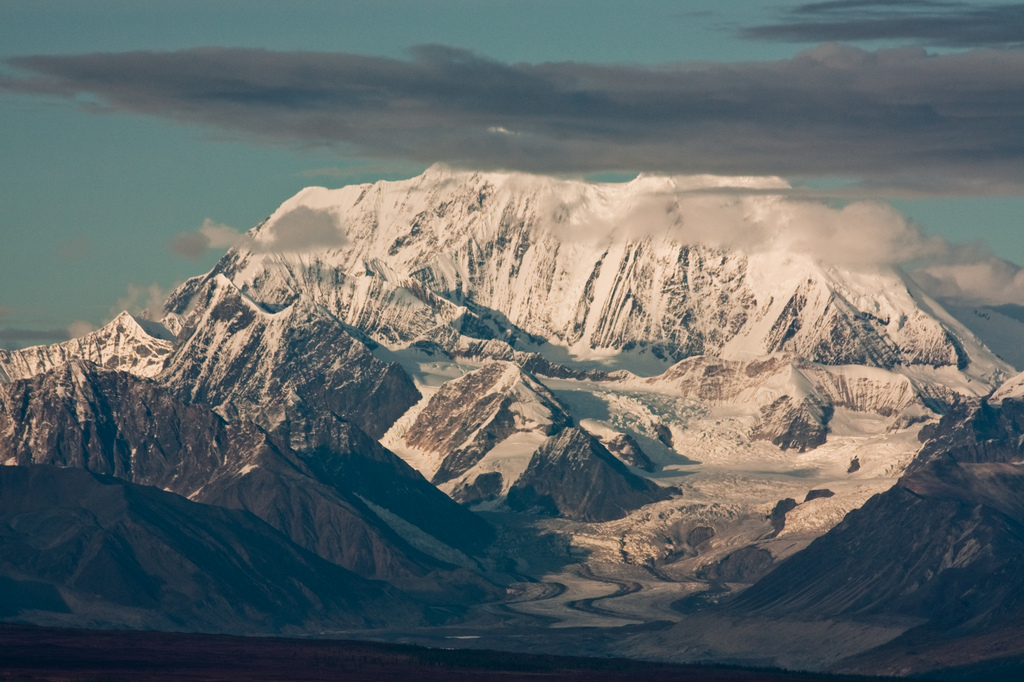
Mount Hayes is the highest summit of the eastern Alaska Range.

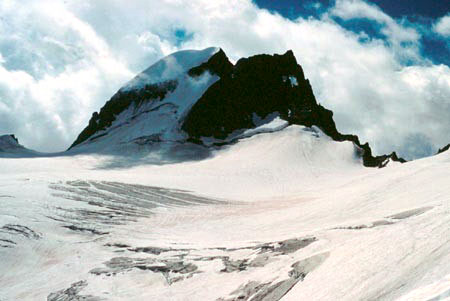
Gannett Peak is the highest summit of the Wind River Range and Wyoming.

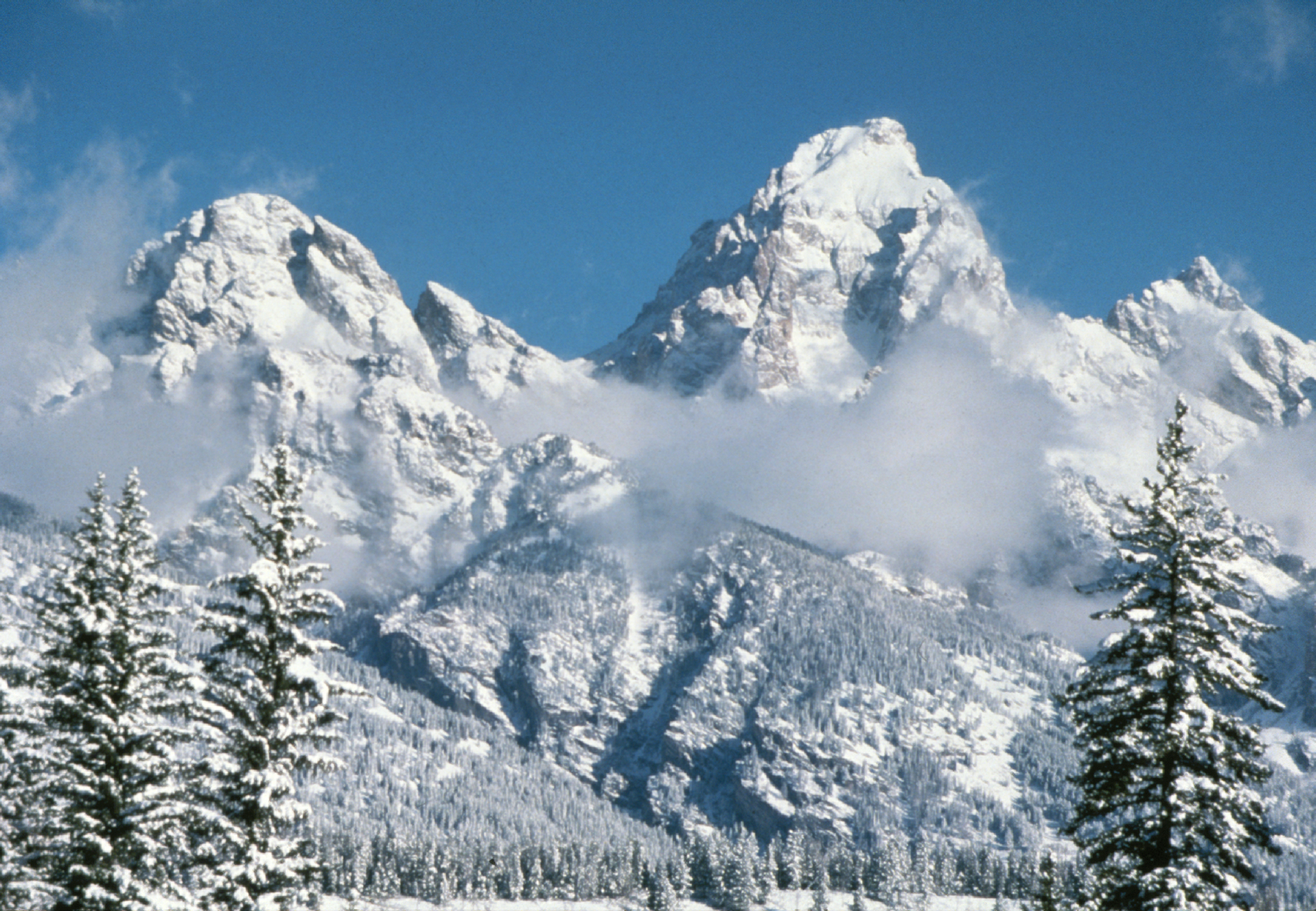
Grand Teton in Wyoming is the highest summit of the Teton Range.

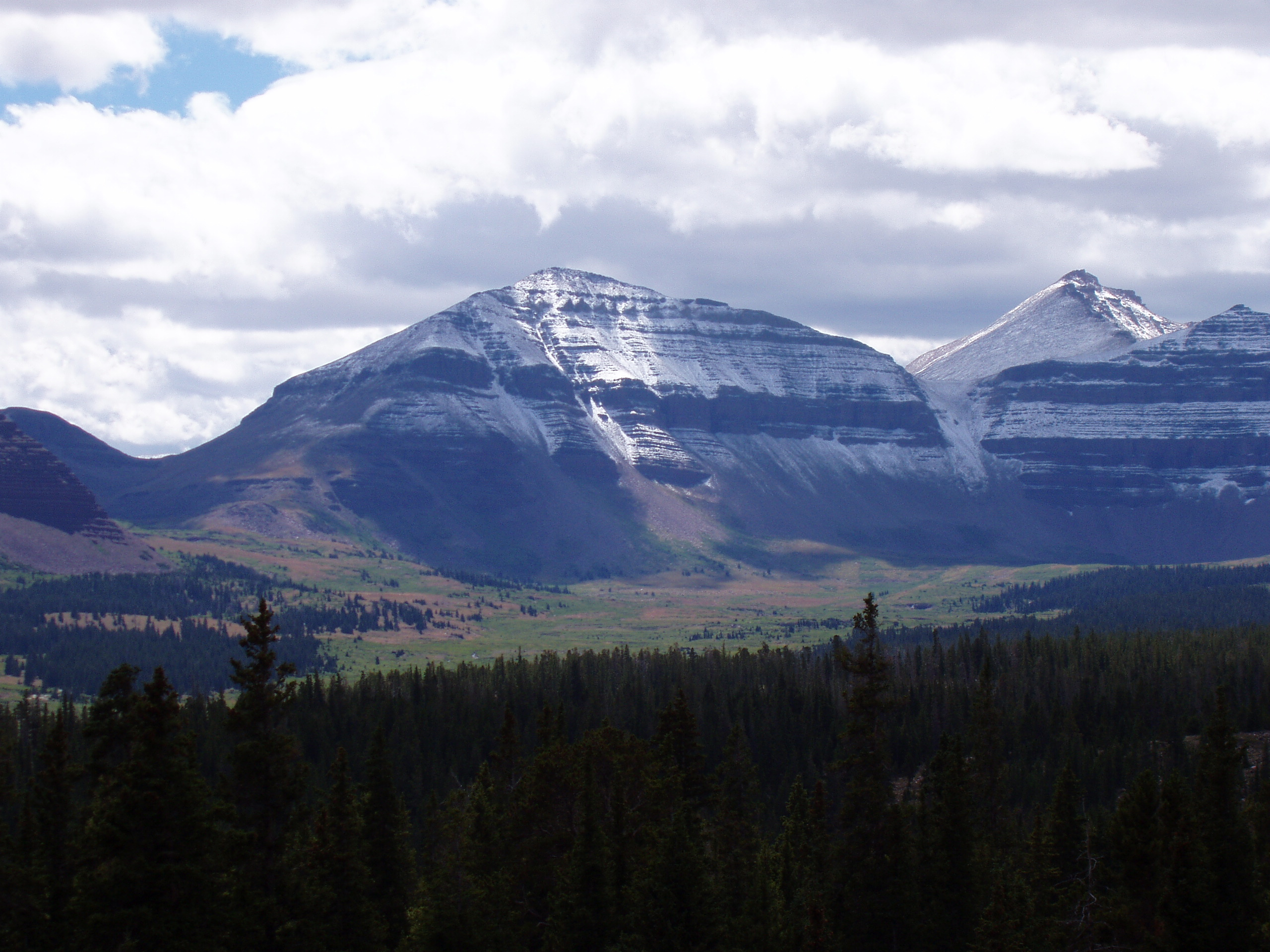
Kings Peak is the highest summit of the Uinta Range and Utah.

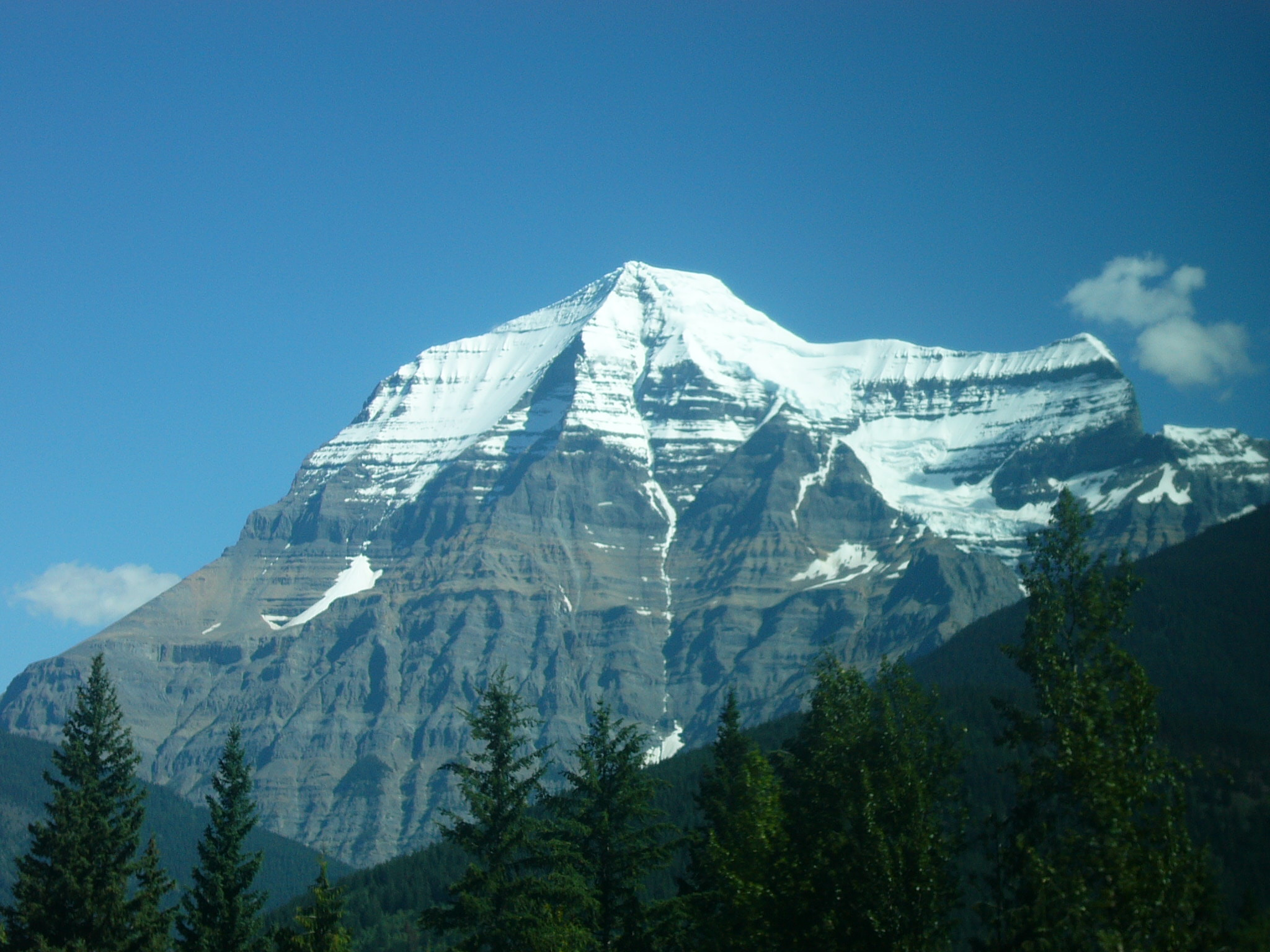
Mount Robson in British Columbia is the highest summit of the Canadian Rockies.

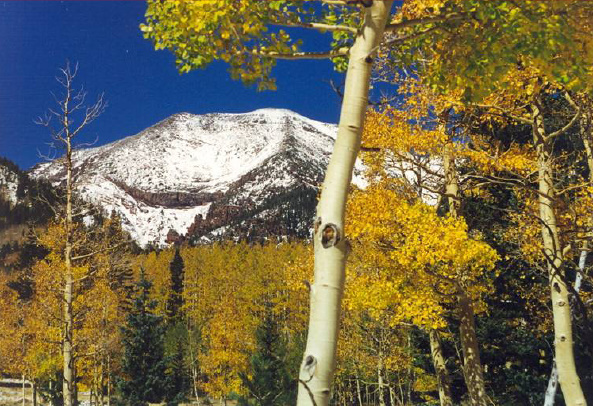
Humphreys Peak is the highest summit of the San Francisco Peaks and Arizona.

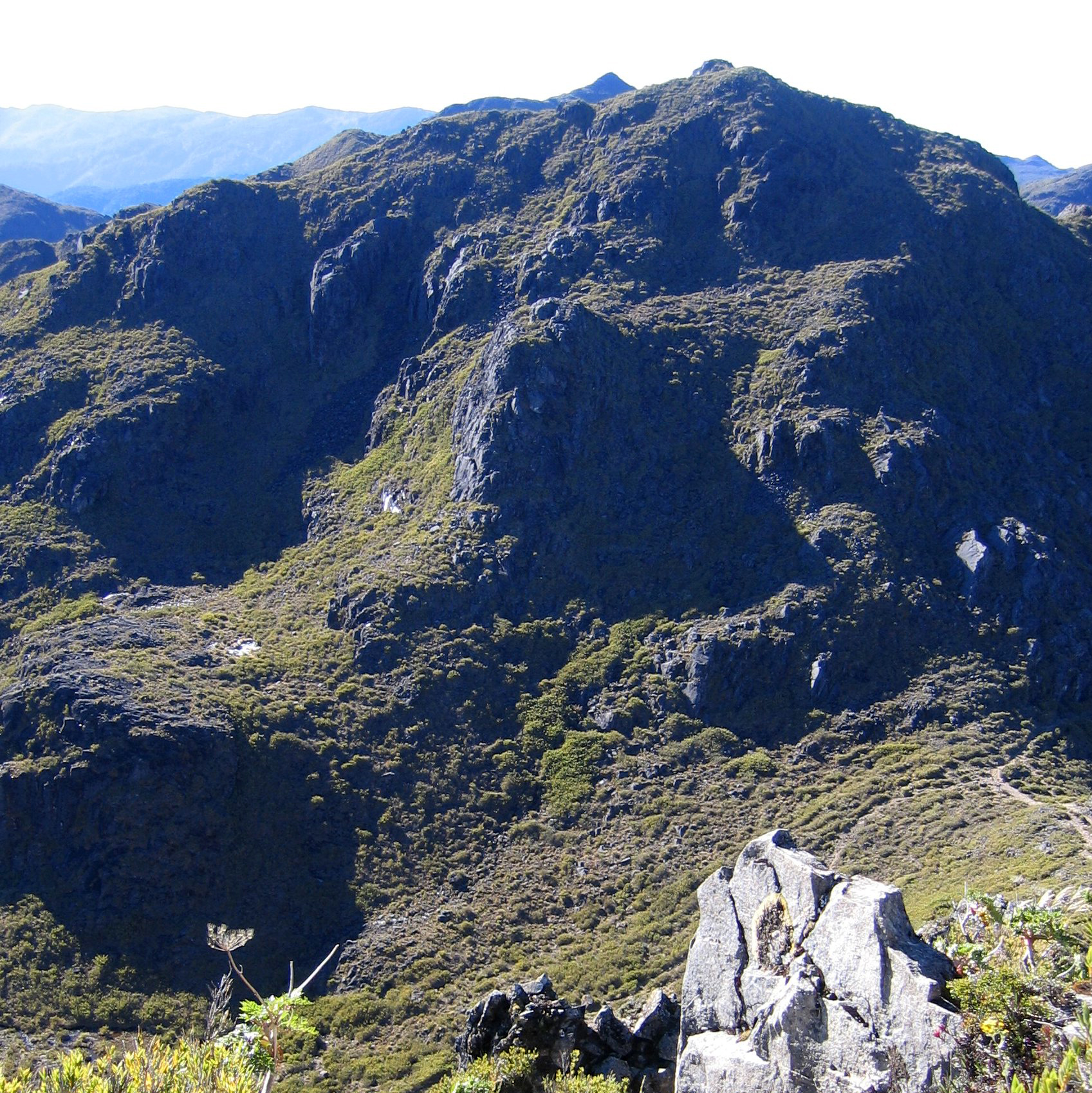
Chirripó Grande is the highest summit of Costa Rica.

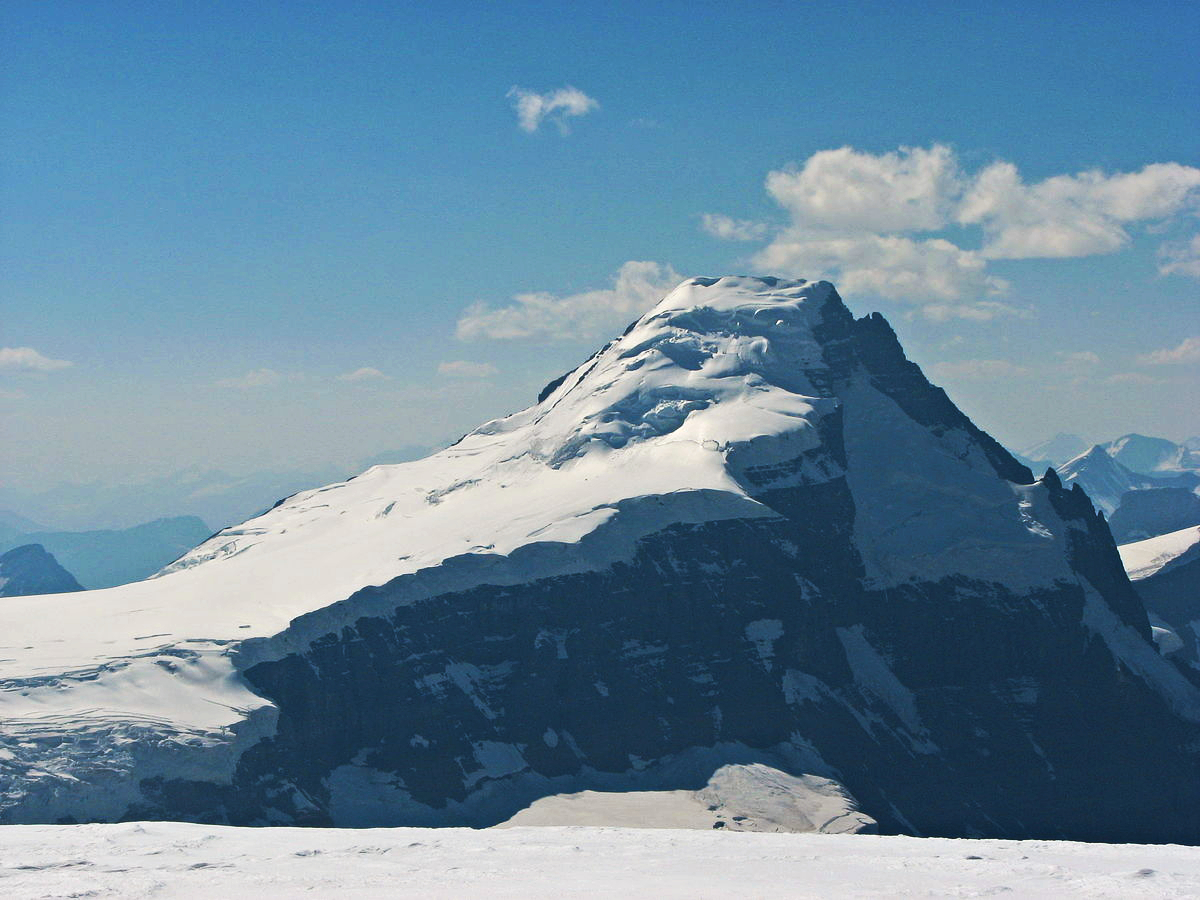
Mount Columbia on the British Columbia border is the highest summit of Alberta.

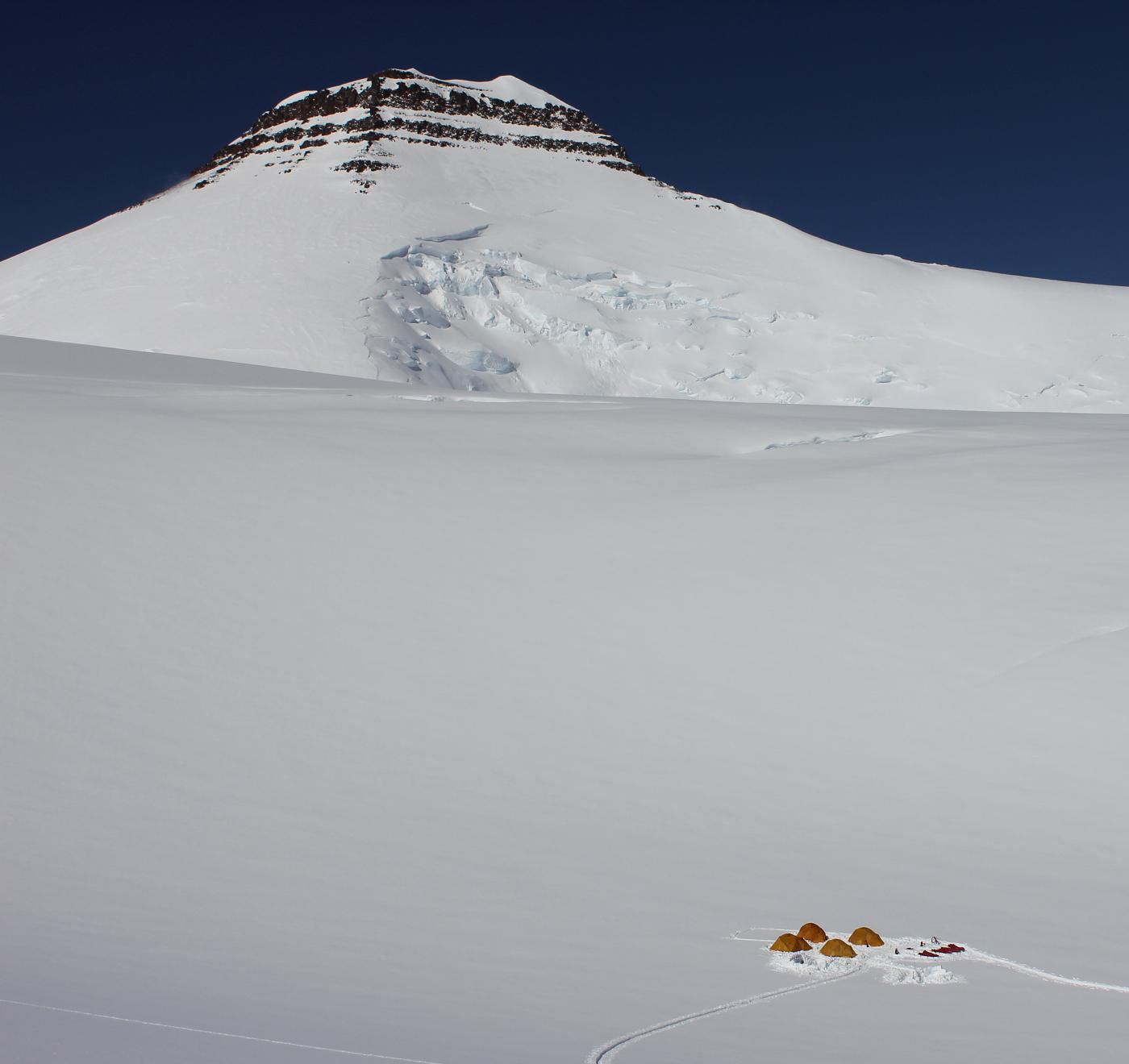
Gunnbjørn Fjeld is the highest summit of Greenland and all of the Arctic.

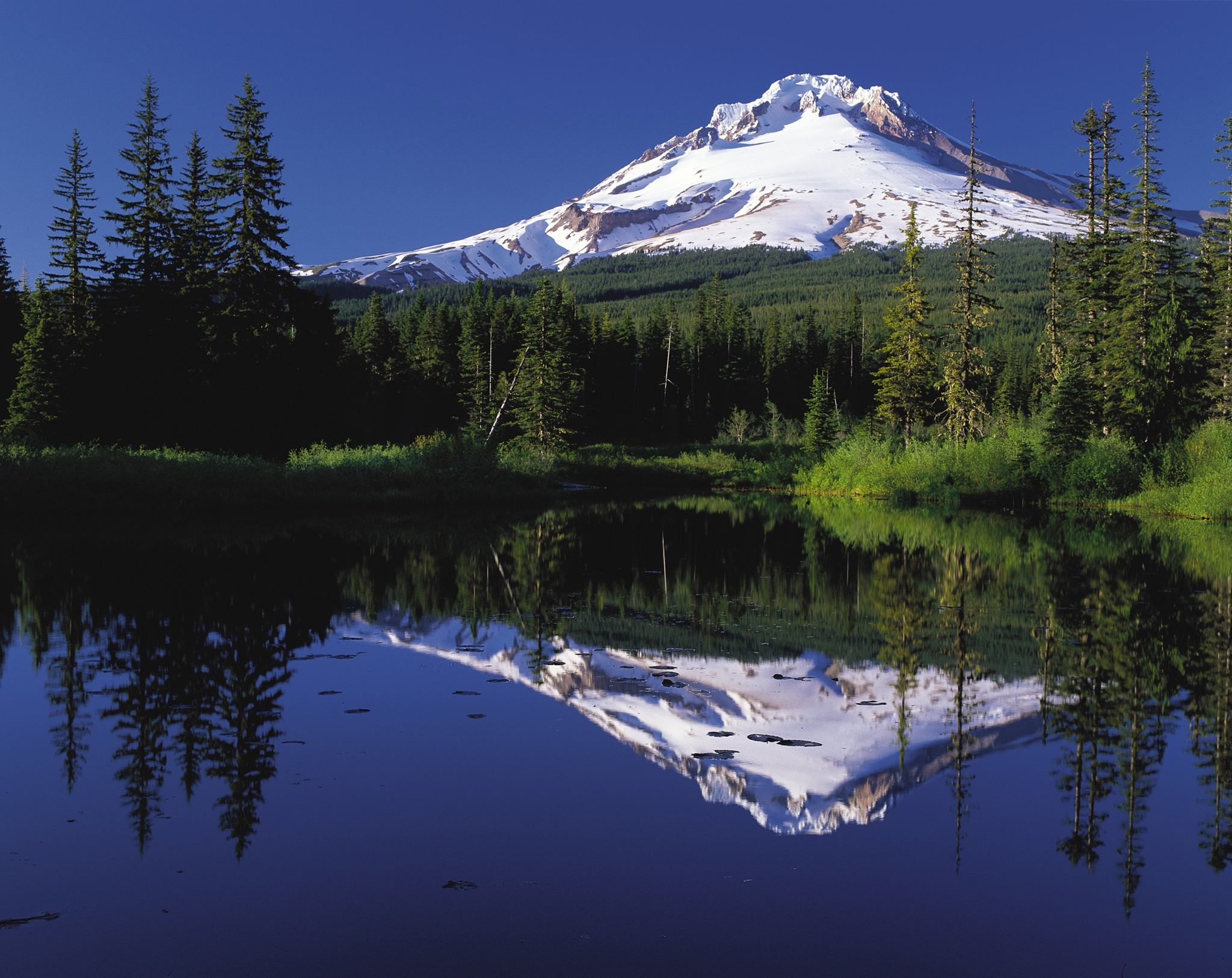
Mount Hood is the highest summit of Oregon.

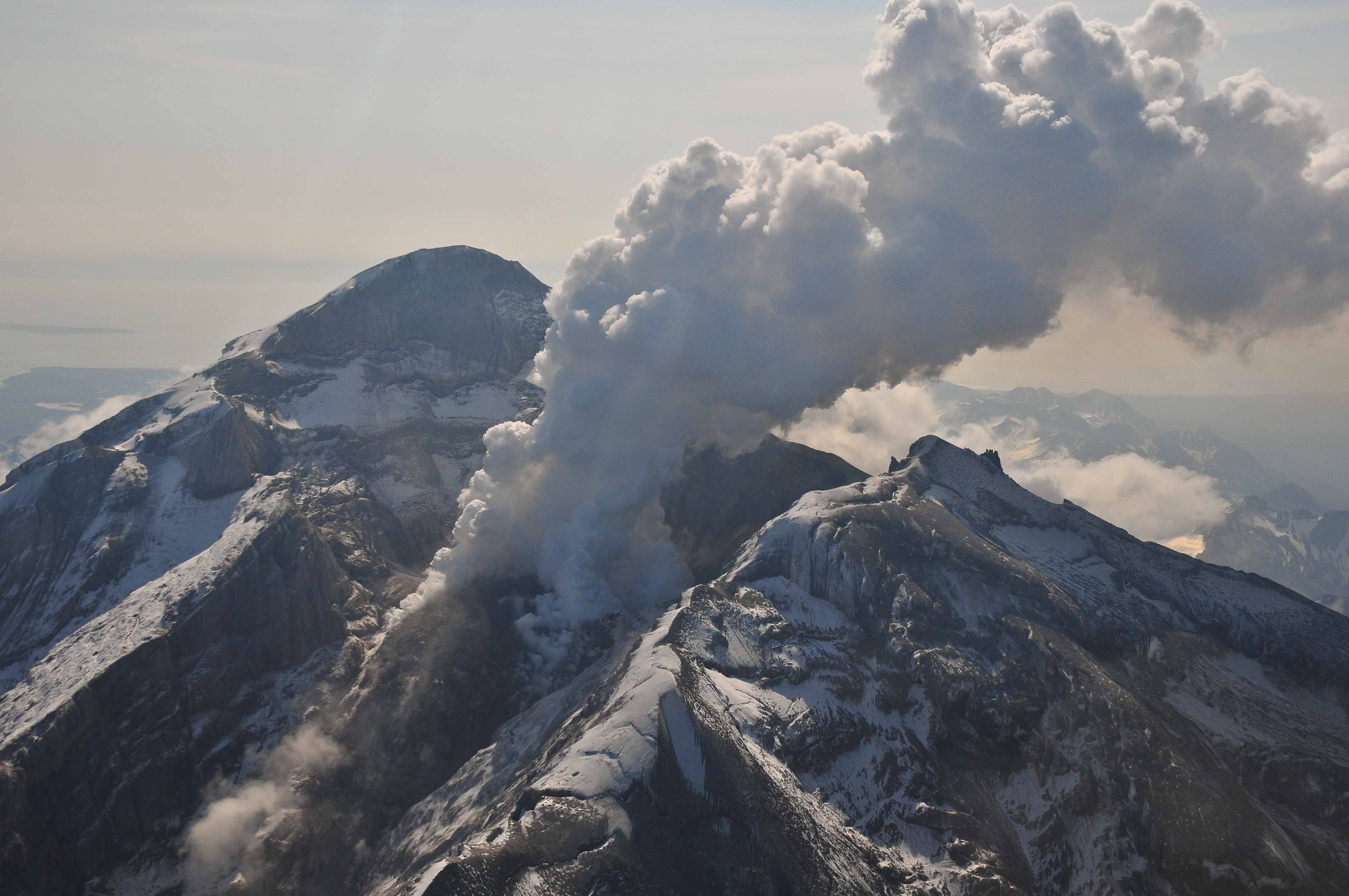
Redoubt Volcano in Alaska is the highest summit of the Aleutian Range.

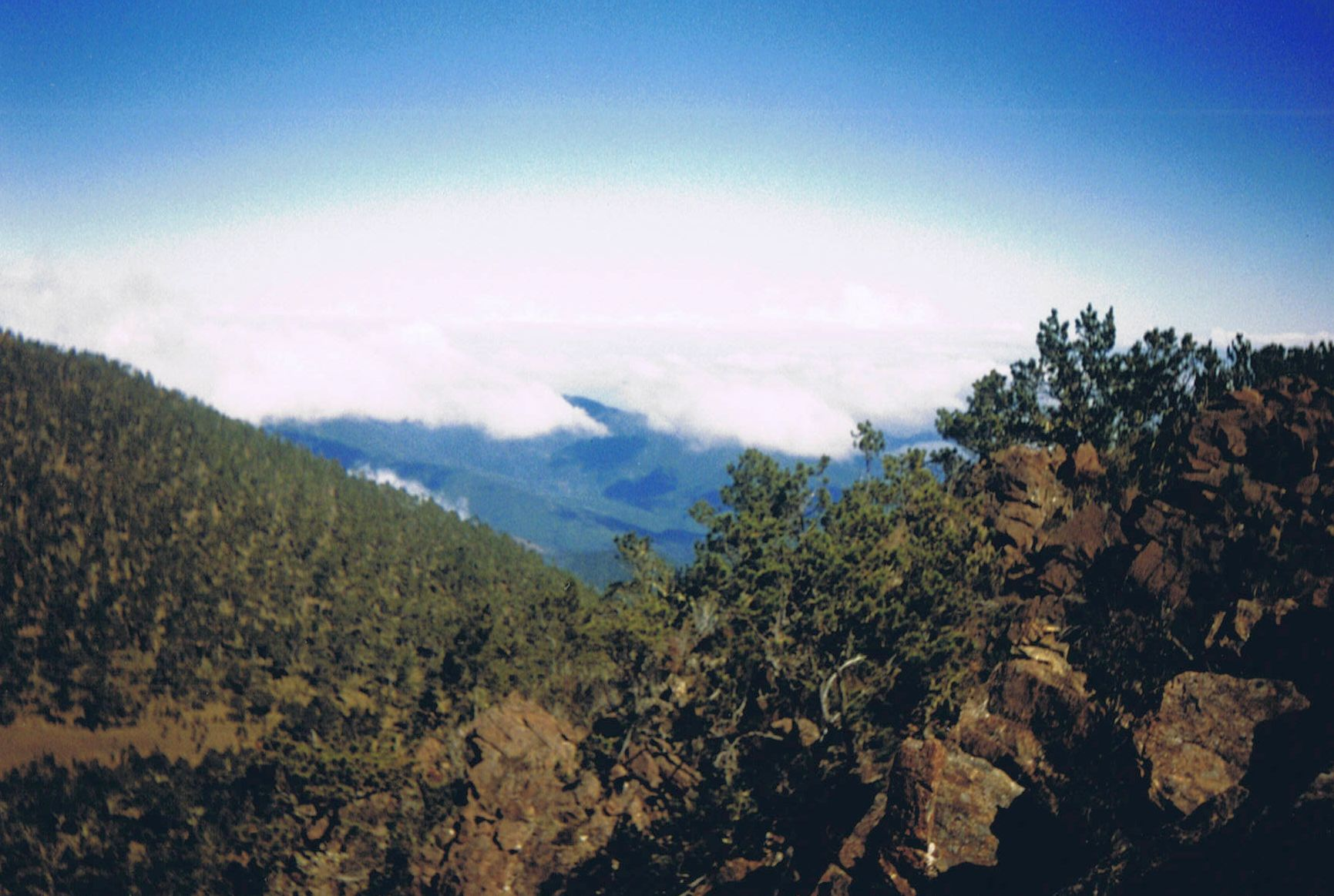
Pico Duarte in the Dominican Republic on Hispaniola is the highest summit in the Caribbean.

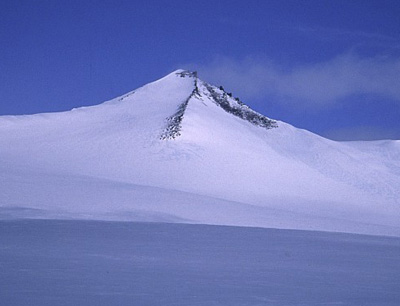
Barbeau Peak is the highest summit of Ellesmere Island and Nunavut.

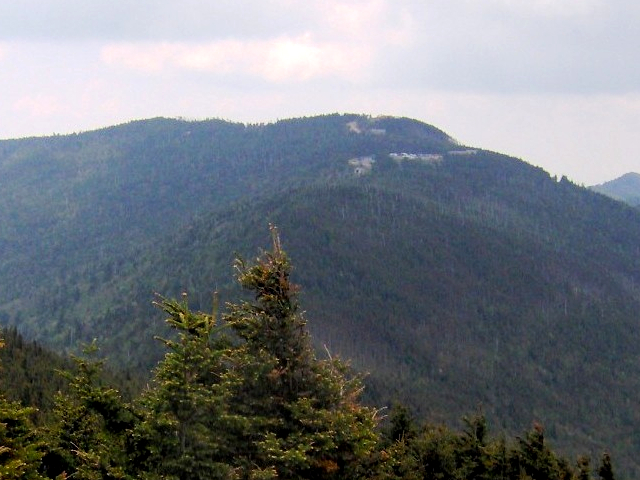
Mount Mitchell is the highest summit of North Carolina and the Appalachian Mountains.

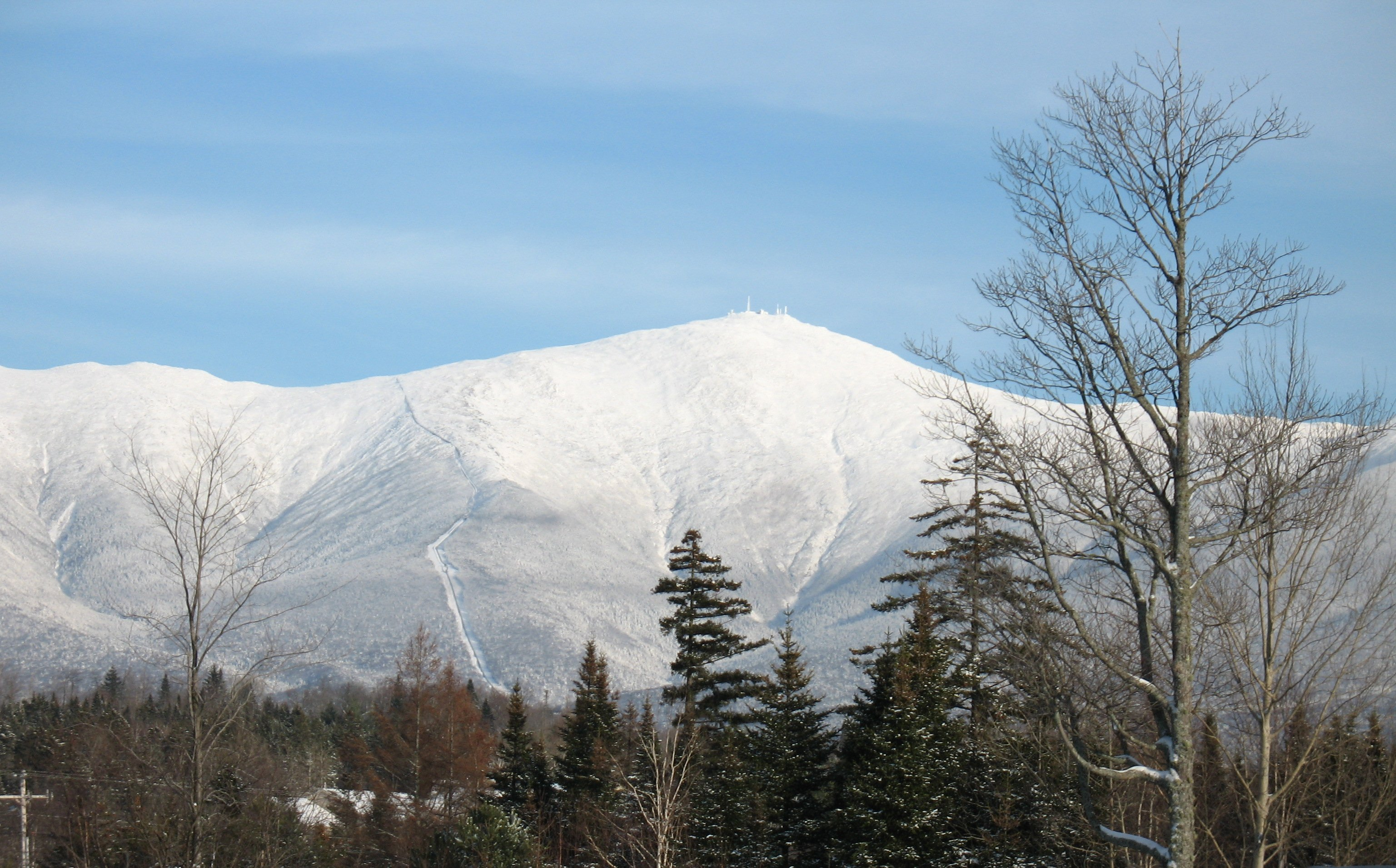
Mount Washington is the highest summit of the White Mountains and New Hampshire..

== See also ==
- North America
  - Geography of North America
  - Geology of North America
  - Lists of mountain peaks of North America
    - List of mountain peaks of North America
      - List of the highest major summits of North America
        - List of the highest islands of North America
      - List of the most prominent summits of North America
        - List of the ultra-prominent summits of North America
      - List of the major 100-kilometer summits of North America
      - List of extreme summits of North America
      - List of mountain peaks of Greenland
      - List of mountain peaks of Canada
      - List of mountain peaks of the Rocky Mountains
      - List of mountain peaks of the United States
      - List of mountain peaks of México
      - List of mountain peaks of Central America
      - List of mountain peaks of the Caribbean
    - Category:Mountains of North America
      - commons:Category:Mountains of North America
- List of mountain peaks by prominence
- Physical geography
  - Topography
    - Topographic elevation
    - Topographic prominence
    - Topographic isolation
