= List of mountain peaks of Mexico =

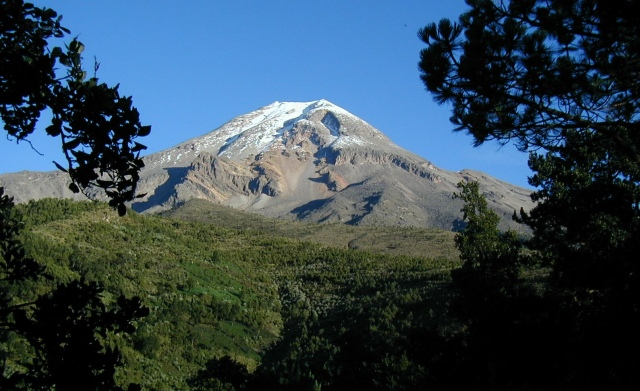
Pico de Orizaba (Citlaltépetl), a stratovolcano on the boundary between the states of Puebla and Veracruz, is the highest mountain peak of Mexico.

This article comprises three sortable tables of major mountain peaks of Mexico.

The summit of a mountain or hill may be measured in three principal ways:

1. The topographic elevation of a summit measures the height on the summit above a geodetic sea level. The first table below ranks the 40 highest major summits of México by elevation.
2. The topographic prominence of a summit is a measure of how high the summit rises above its surroundings. The second table below ranks the 40 most prominent summits of México.
3. The topographic isolation (or radius of dominance) of a summit measures how far the summit lies from its nearest point of equal elevation. The third table below ranks the 40 most isolated major summits of México.

== Highest major summits ==
Of the 40 highest major summits of Mexico, three peaks exceed 5000 meters (16,404 feet) elevation, ten peaks exceed 4000 meters (13,123 feet), and 38 peaks exceed 3000 meters (9843 feet) elevation.

Of these 40 peaks, five are located in Jalisco, five in Coahuila, four in Oaxaca, six in Puebla, four in the state of Mexico, three in Chiapas, two in Nuevo León, two in Veracruz, two in Michoacán, two in Querétaro, two in Durango, two in Chihuahua, two in San Luis Potosí, and one each in Morelos, Tlaxcala, Mexico City, Colima, Guerrero, Guanajuato, Zacatecas, Baja California, Aguascalientes, Sinaloa, and Sonora. Volcán Tacaná lies on the international border between Chiapas and Guatemala, and nine other peaks lie on a state border.

The 40 highest summits of Mexico with at least 500 meters of topographic prominence
Rank	Mountain peak	State	Mountain range	Elevation	Prominence	Isolation	Location
1	Pico de Orizaba (Note: The summit of Pico de Orizaba is the highest point of Puebla, Veracruz, and all of Mexico.) (Citlaltépetl)	Puebla; Veracruz	Trans-Mexican Volcanic Belt	5636 m 18,491 ft	4922 m 16,148 ft	2,690 km 1,672 mi	19.0305°N 97.2698°W
2	Volcán Popocatépetl (Note: Volcán Popocatépetl on the border of Puebla is the highest point of both State of Mexico and Morelos.) (Note: Popocatépetl is the southernmost 5000-meter (16,404-foot) summit of Mexico and greater North America.)	México; Morelos; Puebla	Trans-Mexican Volcanic Belt	5413 m 17,759 ft	3043 m 9,984 ft	142.6 km 88.6 mi	19.0225°N 98.6280°W
3	Iztaccíhuatl (Note: Iztaccíhuatl is the northernmost and westernmost 5000-meter (16,404-foot) summit of Mexico.)	México; Puebla	Trans-Mexican Volcanic Belt	5213 m 17,103 ft	1530 m 5,020 ft	17.16 km 10.66 mi	19.1801°N 98.6416°W
4	Nevado de Toluca (Note: Nevado de Toluca is the westernmost summit of its elevation in Mexico.) (Xinantécatl)	México	Trans-Mexican Volcanic Belt	4690 m 15,387 ft	2225 m 7,300 ft	117.7 km 73.1 mi	19.1020°N 99.7677°W
5	Sierra Negra (Note: Sierra Negra is the southernmost and easternmost summit of its elevation in Mexico.) (Tliltépetl)	Puebla	Trans-Mexican Volcanic Belt	4590 m 15,059 ft	520 m 1,706 ft	4.58 km 2.85 mi	18.9859°N 97.3140°W
6	Volcán La Malinche (Note: Volcán La Malinche on the border of Puebla is the highest point of Tlaxcala.) (Note: La Malinche is the northernmost summit of its elevation in Mexico.) (Matlalcuéyetl)	Puebla; Tlaxcala	Trans-Mexican Volcanic Belt	4438 m 14,560 ft	1928 m 6,325 ft	62.5 km 38.8 mi	19.2310°N 98.0320°W
7	Cofre de Perote (Note: Cofre de Perote is the northernmost and easternmost summit of its elevation in Mexico.) (Naucampatépetl)	Veracruz	Trans-Mexican Volcanic Belt	4282 m 14,049 ft	1412 m 4,633 ft	49.4 km 30.7 mi	19.4940°N 97.1480°W
8	Nevado de Colima (Note: The summit of Nevado de Colima is the highest point of Jalisco.) (Note: Nevado de Colima is the northernmost and westernmost 4000-meter (13,123-foot) summit of Mexico.) (Tzapotépetl)	Jalisco	Trans-Mexican Volcanic Belt	4260 m 13,976 ft	2720 m 8,924 ft	405 km 252 mi	19.5633°N 103.6087°W
9	Cerro Tláloc (Note: The summit of Cerro Tláloc is the highest point of Sierra de Río Frío.)	México	Trans-Mexican Volcanic Belt	4158 m 13,642 ft	968 m 3,176 ft	22.7 km 14.07 mi	19.4125°N 98.7124°W
10	Volcán Tacaná (Note: Volcán Tacaná on the international border with Guatemala is the highest point of Chiapas.)	Chiapas; Guatemala	Sierra Madre de Chiapas	4067 m 13,343 ft	1017 m 3,337 ft	23.8 km 14.78 mi	15.1325°N 92.1085°W
11	Cerro Ajusco (Note: The summit of Cerro Ajusco is the highest point of Mexico City.)	Mexico City	Trans-Mexican Volcanic Belt	3937 m 12,917 ft	1217 m 3,993 ft	53.5 km 33.2 mi	19.2074°N 99.2582°W
12	Jocotitlán (volcano)	México (state)	Trans-Mexican Volcanic Belt	3910 m 12,828 ft	1200 m 3,937 ft	69.7 km 43.3 mi	19.738056°N 99.758889°W
13	Volcán Tancítaro (Note: The summit of Volcán Tancítaro is the highest point of Michoacán.)	Michoacán	Trans-Mexican Volcanic Belt	3840 m 12,598 ft	1665 m 5,463 ft	136.3 km 84.7 mi	19.4166°N 102.3198°W
14	Volcán de Colima (Note: Volcán de Colima on the border of Jalisco is the highest point of Colima and the westernmost summit of its elevation in Mexico.)	Colima; Jalisco	Trans-Mexican Volcanic Belt	3830 m 12,566 ft	610 m 2,001 ft	5.62 km 3.49 mi	19.5132°N 103.6174°W
15	Cerro El Potosí (Note: The summit of Cerro El Potosí is the highest point of Sierra Madre Oriental and Nuevo León.)	Nuevo León	Sierra Madre Oriental	3720 m 12,205 ft	1875 m 6,152 ft	571 km 355 mi	24.8719°N 100.2327°W
16	Cerro San Rafael (Note: The summit of Cerro San Rafael is the highest point of Coahuila.) (Note: Cerro San Rafael is the northernmost summit of its elevation in Mexico.)	Coahuila	Sierra Madre Oriental	3715 m 12,188 ft	1410 m 4,626 ft	628 km 390 mi	25.3637°N 100.5571°W
17	Cerro el Nacimiento (Note: The summit of Cerro el Nacimiento is the highest point of Sierra Madre del Sur and Oaxaca.)	Oaxaca	Sierra Madre del Sur	3710 m 12,172 ft	2140 m 7,021 ft	329 km 205 mi	16.2115°N 96.1967°W
18	Cerro El Campanario (Note: The summit of Cerro El Campanario is the highest point of Monarch Butterfly Biosphere Reserve.)	Michoacán	Trans-Mexican Volcanic Belt	3640 m 11,942 ft	1100 m 3,609 ft	ND	19.595297°N 100.247212°W
19	Cerro Pelón massif high point	México (state)	Trans-Mexican Volcanic Belt	3560 m 11,680 ft	±700	ND	19.402250°N 100.225493°W
20	Cerro Teotepec (Note: The summit of Cerro Teotepec is the highest point of Guerrero.)	Guerrero	Sierra Madre del Sur	3550 m 11,647 ft	2180 m 7,152 ft	185 km 114.9 mi	17.4682°N 100.1364°W
20	Picacho San Onofre (Sierra Peña Nevada)	Nuevo León	Sierra Madre Oriental	3550 m 11,647 ft	1650 m 5,413 ft	125 km 77.6 mi	23.8007°N 99.8464°W
22	Las Derrumbadas south summit	Puebla	Trans-Mexican Volcanic Belt	3480 m 11,417 ft	±1000	ND	19.264808°N 97.447356°W
23	Cerro El Jabalín (Note: The summit of Cerro El Jabalín is the highest point of the Mexican Plateau.)	Coahuila	Mexican Plateau	3450 m 11,319 ft	1350 m 4,429 ft	84.8 km 52.7 mi	25.1899°N 101.3775°W
24	Cerro El Rosario (Note: The summit of Cerro El Rosario is the highest point of Sierra de Tlaxco.)	Puebla	Trans-Mexican Volcanic Belt	3440 m 11,286 ft	>800	51.4 km 31.9 mi	19.678789°N 98.201574°W
25	Cerro Zempoaltépetl	Oaxaca	Sierra Madre de Oaxaca	3420 m 11,220 ft	1580 m 5,184 ft	103.2 km 64.1 mi	17.1324°N 96.0125°W
25	Las Derrumbadas north summit	Puebla	Trans-Mexican Volcanic Belt	3420 m 11,220 ft	640 m 2,100 ft	ND	19.301626°N 97.470537°W
27	El Zamorano (Note: The summit of El Zamorano is the highest point of both Guanajuato and Querétaro.)	Querétaro; Guanajuato	Mexican Plateau	3370 m 11,056 ft	1450 m 4,757 ft	104.8 km 65.1 mi	20.9338°N 100.1805°W
28	Cerro la Muralla	Oaxaca	Sierra Madre del Sur	3370 m 11,056 ft	1430 m 4,692 ft	175.7 km 109.2 mi	17.1344°N 97.6640°W
29	Cerro Gordo (Note: The summit of Cerro Gordo is the highest point of the Sierra Madre Occidental and Durango.) (Note: Cerro Gordo is the westernmost summit of its elevation in Mexico.)	Durango	Sierra Madre Occidental	3357 m 11,014 ft	1387 m 4,551 ft	424 km 263 mi	23.2060°N 104.9442°W
30	Cerro Mohinora (Note: The summit of Cerro Mohinora is the highest point of Chihuahua.) (Note: Cerro Mohinora is the northernmost and westernmost summit of its elevation in Mexico.)	Chihuahua	Sierra Madre Occidental	3308 m 10,853 ft	873 m 2,864 ft	231 km 143.5 mi	25.9560°N 107.0476°W
31	El Pinal	Puebla	Trans-Mexican Volcanic Belt	3280 m 10,761 ft	740 m 2,428 ft	10.5 km 6.52 mi	19.142227°N 97.906845°W
32	Cerro El Refugio (Note: The summit of Cerro El Refugio is the highest point of Zacatecas.)	Zacatecas; Coahuila	Mexican Plateau	3200 m 10,499 ft	500 m 1,640 ft	73.4 km 45.6 mi	24.5761°N 101.1047°W
33	Cerro Grande (Note: The summit of Cerro Grande is the highest point of San Luis Potosí.)	San Luis Potosí	Mexican Plateau	3190 m 10,466 ft	500 m 1,640 ft	103.1 km 64.1 mi	23.6667°N 100.8873°W
34	Cerro El Centinela	Coahuila	Mexican Plateau	3122 m 10,243 ft	1657 m 5,436 ft	186.9 km 116.1 mi	25.1359°N 103.2304°W
35	Picacho del Diablo (Note: The summit of Picacho del Diablo is the highest point of Sierra de San Pedro Mártir and the Baja California Peninsula.) (Note: Picacho del Diablo is the northernmost and westernmost 3000-meter (9843-foot) summit and ultra-prominent summit of Mexico.)	Baja California	Sierra de San Pedro Mártir	3095 m 10,154 ft	2125 m 6,972 ft	335 km 208 mi	30.9925°N 115.3753°W
36	Sierra la Madera	Coahuila	Mexican Plateau	3030 m 9,941 ft	1905 m 6,250 ft	226 km 140.7 mi	27.0345°N 102.3922°W
37	Sierra Fría (Note: The summit of Sierra Fría is the highest point of Aguascalientes.)	Aguascalientes	Sierra Madre Occidental	3030 m 9,941 ft	500 m 1,640 ft	234 km 145.6 mi	22.2739°N 102.6073°W
38	Cerro Pinto	Puebla	Trans-Mexican Volcanic Belt	3000 m 9,843 ft	560 m 1,837 ft	ND	19.371839°N 97.499266°W
39	Cerro Viejo	Jalisco	Mexican West Coast Ranges	2965 m 9,728 ft	1355 m 4,446 ft	90.5 km 56.3 mi	20.3648°N 103.4368°W
40	Cerro Alto Tapanco (Note: Cerro Alto Tapanco on the border of Durango is the highest point of Sinaloa.)	Sinaloa; Durango	Sierra Madre Occidental	2960 m 9,711 ft	640 m 2,100 ft	38 km 23.6 mi	25.6206°N 106.9665°W

== Most prominent summits ==
Of the 40 most prominent summits of México, only Pico de Orizaba exceeds 4000 meters (13,123 feet) of topographic prominence, Popocatépetl exceeds 3000 meters (9843 feet), five peaks exceed 2000 meters (6562 feet), and 26 peaks are ultra-prominent summits with at least 1500 meters (4921 feet) of topographic prominence.

Of these 40 peaks, five are located in Oaxaca, five in Baja California, four in Puebla, four in Jalisco, four in Nuevo León, four in Coahuila, three in Veracruz, three in México, three in Baja California Sur, two in Michoacán, two in Querétaro, and one each in Morelos, Guerrero, Tlaxcala, Guanajuato, Durango, Chiapas, and Distrito Federal. Five peaks lie on a state border.

The 40 most topographically prominent summits of México
Rank	Mountain peak	State	Mountain range	Elevation	Prominence	Isolation	Location
1	Pico de Orizaba (Citlaltépetl)	Puebla; Veracruz	Trans-Mexican Volcanic Belt	5636 m 18,491 ft	4922 m 16,148 ft	2,690 km 1,672 mi	19.0305°N 97.2698°W
2	Volcán Popocatépetl	México; Morelos; Puebla	Trans-Mexican Volcanic Belt	5413 m 17,759 ft	3043 m 9,984 ft	142.6 km 88.6 mi	19.0225°N 98.6280°W
3	Nevado de Colima (Tzapotépetl)	Jalisco	Trans-Mexican Volcanic Belt	4270 m 14,009 ft	2720 m 8,924 ft	405 km 252 mi	19.5633°N 103.6087°W
4	Nevado de Toluca (Xinantécatl)	México	Trans-Mexican Volcanic Belt	4690 m 15,387 ft	2225 m 7,300 ft	117.7 km 73.1 mi	19.1020°N 99.7677°W
5	Cerro Teotepec	Guerrero	Sierra Madre del Sur	3550 m 11,647 ft	2180 m 7,152 ft	185 km 114.9 mi	17.4682°N 100.1364°W
6	Cerro el Nacimiento	Oaxaca	Sierra Madre del Sur	3710 m 12,172 ft	2140 m 7,021 ft	329 km 205 mi	16.2115°N 96.1967°W
7	Picacho del Diablo	Baja California	Sierra de San Pedro Mártir	3095 m 10,154 ft	2125 m 6,972 ft	335 km 208 mi	30.9925°N 115.3753°W
8	Sierra de Minas Viejas	Nuevo León	Sierra Madre Oriental	2710 m 8,891 ft	1965 m 6,447 ft	54.9 km 34.1 mi	26.1196°N 100.5568°W
9	Cerro Las Conchas	Michoacán	Michoacán	2890 m 9,482 ft	1960 m 6,430 ft	103.3 km 64.2 mi	18.7215°N 102.9740°W
10	Volcán La Malinche (Matlalcuéyetl)	Puebla; Tlaxcala	Trans-Mexican Volcanic Belt	4438 m 14,560 ft	1928 m 6,325 ft	62.5 km 38.8 mi	19.2310°N 98.0320°W
11	Pico La Laguna (Note: The summit of Pico La Laguna is the highest point of Sierra San Lazaro and Baja California Sur.)	Baja California Sur	Sierra La Laguna	2090 m 6,857 ft	1920 m 6,299 ft	343 km 213 mi	23.5392°N 109.9542°W
12	Sierra la Madera	Coahuila	Mexican Plateau	3030 m 9,941 ft	1905 m 6,250 ft	226 km 140.7 mi	27.0345°N 102.3922°W
13	Cerro la Joya	Querétaro	Sierra Madre Oriental	2950 m 9,678 ft	1900 m 6,234 ft	66.1 km 41.1 mi	21.4309°N 99.1326°W
14	Cerro El Potosí (Note: The summit of Cerro El Potosí is the highest point of Sierra Madre Oriental and Nuevo León.)	Nuevo León	Sierra Madre Oriental	3720 m 12,205 ft	1875 m 6,152 ft	571 km 355 mi	24.8719°N 100.2327°W
15	Volcán Tancítaro	Michoacán	Trans-Mexican Volcanic Belt	3840 m 12,598 ft	1665 m 5,463 ft	136.3 km 84.7 mi	19.4166°N 102.3198°W
16	Cerro El Centinela	Coahuila	Mexican Plateau	3122 m 10,243 ft	1657 m 5,436 ft	186.9 km 116.1 mi	25.1359°N 103.2304°W
17	Picacho San Onofre (Sierra Peña Nevada)	Nuevo León	Sierra Madre Oriental	3550 m 11,647 ft	1650 m 5,413 ft	125 km 77.6 mi	23.8007°N 99.8464°W
17	El Aguacate Oeste	Oaxaca	Sierra Madre del Sur	2830 m 9,285 ft	1650 m 5,413 ft	57.3 km 35.6 mi	16.5812°N 95.8035°W
19	Volcán Las Tres Vírgenes	Baja California Sur	Tres Vírgenes	1951 m 6,401 ft	1626 m 5,335 ft	340 km 211 mi	27.4700°N 112.5919°W
20	Sierra de Santa Martha	Veracruz	Trans-Mexican Volcanic Belt	1690 m 5,545 ft	1620 m 5,315 ft	180.1 km 111.9 mi	18.3455°N 94.8576°W
21	Cerro las Capillas	Jalisco	Jalisco	2890 m 9,482 ft	1590 m 5,217 ft	55.8 km 34.7 mi	19.5552°N 104.1472°W
22	Cerro Zempoaltépetl	Oaxaca	Sierra Madre del Sur	3420 m 11,220 ft	1580 m 5,184 ft	103.2 km 64.1 mi	17.1324°N 96.0125°W
23	Iztaccíhuatl	México; Puebla	Trans-Mexican Volcanic Belt	5213 m 17,103 ft	1530 m 5,020 ft	17.16 km 10.66 mi	19.1801°N 98.6416°W
23	Volcán de Tequila	Jalisco	Jalisco	2930 m 9,613 ft	1530 m 5,020 ft	63.4 km 39.4 mi	20.7872°N 103.8468°W
25	Cerro Atravesado (Sierra el Cerro Azul)	Oaxaca	Oaxaca	2310 m 7,579 ft	1510 m 4,954 ft	109.6 km 68.1 mi	16.7652°N 94.4514°W
25	Sierra del Fraile	Nuevo León	Sierra Madre Oriental	2310 m 7,579 ft	1510 m 4,954 ft	26.2 km 16.26 mi	25.8645°N 100.6095°W
27	Cerro El Zamorano (Note: The summit of Cerro El Zamorano is the highest point of both Guanajuato and Querétaro.)	Querétaro; Guanajuato	Mexican Plateau	3370 m 11,056 ft	1450 m 4,757 ft	104.8 km 65.1 mi	20.9338°N 100.1805°W
28	Cerro la Muralla	Oaxaca	Sierra Madre del Sur	3370 m 11,056 ft	1430 m 4,692 ft	175.7 km 109.2 mi	17.1344°N 97.6640°W
29	Cofre de Perote (Naucampatépetl)	Veracruz	Trans-Mexican Volcanic Belt	4282 m 14,049 ft	1412 m 4,633 ft	49.4 km 30.7 mi	19.4940°N 97.1480°W
30	Cerro San Rafael	Coahuila	Sierra Madre Oriental	3715 m 12,188 ft	1410 m 4,626 ft	628 km 390 mi	25.3637°N 100.5571°W
31	Cerro La Sandía	Baja California	Baja California Peninsula	1810 m 5,938 ft	1400 m 4,593 ft	133.2 km 82.7 mi	28.4073°N 113.4387°W
31	Cerro Giganta (Note: The summit of Cerro Giganta is the highest point of 33005.)	Baja California Sur	Sierra de la Giganta	1690 m 5,545 ft	1400 m 4,593 ft	120.7 km 75 mi	26.1064°N 111.5844°W
33	Cerro Gordo	Durango	Sierra Madre Occidental	3357 m 11,014 ft	1387 m 4,551 ft	424 km 263 mi	23.2060°N 104.9442°W
34	Cerro Tzontehuitz	Chiapas	Sierra Madre de Chiapas	2910 m 9,547 ft	1370 m 4,495 ft	164.5 km 102.2 mi	16.8358°N 92.5894°W
35	Cerro Viejo	Jalisco	Mexican West Coast Ranges	2965 m 9,728 ft	1355 m 4,446 ft	90.5 km 56.3 mi	20.3648°N 103.4368°W
36	Cerro El Jabalín	Coahuila	Mexican Plateau	3450 m 11,319 ft	1350 m 4,429 ft	84.8 km 52.7 mi	25.1899°N 101.3775°W
37	Isla Guadalupe high point (Note: The summit of Isla Guadalupe is the westernmost 1000-meter (3281-foot) summit of Mexico.)	Baja California	Isla Guadalupe	1310 m 4,298 ft	1310 m 4,298 ft	340 km 211 mi	29.1016°N 118.3132°W
38	Cerro Las Palmas (Note: The summit of Cerro Las Palmas is the highest point of Sierra Giganta.)	Baja California Sur	Sierra de la Giganta	1750 m 5,741 ft	1240 m 4,068 ft	68.8 km 42.7 mi	26.8612°N 112.4574°W
39	Cerro Ajusco	Distrito Federal	Trans-Mexican Volcanic Belt	3937 m 12,917 ft	1227 m 4,026 ft	53.5 km 33.2 mi	19.2074°N 99.2582°W
40	Isla Cedros high point	Baja California	Isla Cedros	1200 m 3,937 ft	1200 m 3,937 ft	168.5 km 104.7 mi	28.1301°N 115.2206°W

== Most isolated major summits ==
Of the 40 most isolated major summits of México, only Pico de Orizaba exceeds 2000 kilometers (1243 miles) of topographic isolation. Four peaks exceed 500 kilometers (310.7 miles), 14 peaks exceed 200 kilometers (124.3 miles), and 33 peaks exceed 100 kilometers (62.14 miles) of topographic isolation.

Of these 40 peaks, five are located in Coahuila, four in Baja California, four in Oaxaca, three in Puebla, three in Jalisco, three in Baja California Sur, two in Veracruz, two in Nuevo León, two in Chihuahua, two in Chiapas, two in México, two in Michoacán, two in Querétaro, and one each in Colima, Durango, Guerrero, Sonora, Morelos, Guanajuato, San Luis Potosí, Zacatecas, Tlaxcala, and Nayarit. Six peaks lie on a state border.

The 40 most topographically isolated summits of México with at least 500 meters of topographic prominence
Rank	Mountain peak	State	Mountain range	Elevation	Prominence	Isolation	Location
1	Pico de Orizaba (Citlaltépetl)	Puebla; Veracruz	Trans-Mexican Volcanic Belt	5636 m 18,491 ft	4922 m 16,148 ft	2,690 km 1,672 mi	19.0305°N 97.2698°W
2	Cerro San Rafael	Coahuila	Sierra Madre Oriental	3715 m 12,188 ft	1410 m 4,626 ft	628 km 390 mi	25.3637°N 100.5571°W
3	Cerro El Potosí	Nuevo León	Sierra Madre Oriental	3720 m 12,205 ft	1875 m 6,152 ft	571 km 355 mi	24.8719°N 100.2327°W
4	Volcán Everman (Note: The summit of Volcán Everman is the highest point of Isla Socorro.)	Colima	Isla Socorro	1050 m 3,445 ft	1050 m 3,445 ft	500 km 311 mi	18.8000°N 110.9833°W
5	Cerro Gordo	Durango	Sierra Madre Occidental	3357 m 11,014 ft	1387 m 4,551 ft	424 km 263 mi	23.2060°N 104.9442°W
6	Nevado de Colima (Tzapotépetl)	Jalisco	Trans-Mexican Volcanic Belt	4270 m 14,009 ft	2720 m 8,924 ft	405 km 252 mi	19.5633°N 103.6087°W
7	Pico La Laguna	Baja California Sur	Sierra La Laguna	2090 m 6,857 ft	1920 m 6,299 ft	343 km 213 mi	23.5392°N 109.9542°W
8	Volcán Las Tres Vírgenes	Baja California Sur	Tres Virgenes	1951 m 6,401 ft	1626 m 5,335 ft	340 km 211 mi	27.4700°N 112.5919°W
9	Isla Guadalupe high point	Baja California	Isla Guadalupe	1310 m 4,298 ft	1310 m 4,298 ft	340 km 211 mi	29.1016°N 118.3132°W
10	Picacho del Diablo	Baja California	Sierra de San Pedro Mártir	3095 m 10,154 ft	2125 m 6,972 ft	335 km 208 mi	30.9925°N 115.3753°W
11	Cerro el Nacimiento	Oaxaca	Sierra Madre del Sur	3710 m 12,172 ft	2140 m 7,021 ft	329 km 205 mi	16.2115°N 96.1967°W
12	Sierra Fría	Aguascalientes	Sierra Madre Occidental	3030 m 9,941 ft	500 m 1,640 ft	234 km 145.6 mi	22.2739°N 102.6073°W
13	Cerro Mohinora	Chihuahua	Sierra Madre Occidental	3308 m 10,853 ft	858 m 2,815 ft	231 km 143.5 mi	25.9560°N 107.0476°W
14	Sierra la Madera	Coahuila	Mexican Plateau	3030 m 9,941 ft	1905 m 6,250 ft	226 km 140.7 mi	27.0345°N 102.3922°W
15	Cerro El Centinela	Coahuila	Mexican Plateau	3122 m 10,243 ft	1657 m 5,436 ft	186.9 km 116.1 mi	25.1359°N 103.2304°W
16	Cerro Teotepec	Guerrero	Sierra Madre del Sur	3550 m 11,647 ft	2180 m 7,152 ft	185 km 114.9 mi	17.4682°N 100.1364°W
17	Sierra de Santa Martha	Veracruz	Trans-Mexican Volcanic Belt	1690 m 5,545 ft	1620 m 5,315 ft	180.1 km 111.9 mi	18.3455°N 94.8576°W
18	Cerro la Muralla	Oaxaca	Sierra Madre del Sur	3370 m 11,056 ft	1430 m 4,692 ft	175.7 km 109.2 mi	17.1344°N 97.6640°W
19	Isla Cedros high point	Baja California	Isla Cedros	1200 m 3,937 ft	1200 m 3,937 ft	168.5 km 104.7 mi	28.1301°N 115.2206°W
20	Cerro Tzontehuitz	Chiapas	Sierra Madre de Chiapas	2910 m 9,547 ft	1370 m 4,495 ft	164.5 km 102.2 mi	16.8358°N 92.5894°W
21	Cerro San José (Note: Cerro San José on the border of Chihuahua is the highest point of Sonora.)	Chihuahua; Sonora	Mexican Plateau	2710 m 8,891 ft	660 m 2,165 ft	152.5 km 94.7 mi	30.5483°N 108.6167°W
22	Volcán Popocatépetl	México; Morelos; Puebla	Trans-Mexican Volcanic Belt	5413 m 17,759 ft	3043 m 9,984 ft	142.6 km 88.6 mi	19.0225°N 98.6280°W
23	Volcán Tancítaro	Michoacán	Trans-Mexican Volcanic Belt	3840 m 12,598 ft	1665 m 5,463 ft	136.3 km 84.7 mi	19.4166°N 102.3198°W
24	Cerro La Sandía	Baja California	Baja California Peninsula	1810 m 5,938 ft	1400 m 4,593 ft	133.2 km 82.7 mi	28.4073°N 113.4387°W
25	Cerro Tres Picos	Chiapas	Sierra Madre de Chiapas	2550 m 8,366 ft	500 m 1,640 ft	130 km 80.8 mi	16.1970°N 93.6112°W
26	Picacho San Onofre (Sierra Peña Nevada)	Nuevo León	Sierra Madre Oriental	3550 m 11,647 ft	1650 m 5,413 ft	125 km 77.6 mi	23.8007°N 99.8464°W
27	Cerro Giganta	Baja California Sur	Sierra de la Giganta	1690 m 5,545 ft	1400 m 4,593 ft	120.7 km 75 mi	26.1064°N 111.5844°W
28	Nevado de Toluca (Xinantécatl)	México	Trans-Mexican Volcanic Belt	4690 m 15,387 ft	2225 m 7,300 ft	117.7 km 73.1 mi	19.1020°N 99.7677°W
29	Cerro Atravesado (Sierra el Cerro Azul)	Oaxaca	Oaxaca	2310 m 7,579 ft	1510 m 4,954 ft	109.6 km 68.1 mi	16.7652°N 94.4514°W
30	Cerro El Zamorano	Querétaro; Guanajuato	Mexican Plateau	3370 m 11,056 ft	1450 m 4,757 ft	104.8 km 65.1 mi	20.9338°N 100.1805°W
31	Cerro Las Conchas	Michoacán	Michoacán	2890 m 9,482 ft	1960 m 6,430 ft	103.3 km 64.2 mi	18.7215°N 102.9740°W
32	Cerro Zempoaltépetl	Oaxaca	Sierra Madre del Sur	3420 m 11,220 ft	1580 m 5,184 ft	103.2 km 64.1 mi	17.1324°N 96.0125°W
33	Cerro Grande	San Luis Potosí	Mexican Plateau	3190 m 10,466 ft	500 m 1,640 ft	103.1 km 64.1 mi	23.6667°N 100.8873°W
34	Cerro Viejo	Jalisco	Mexican West Coast Ranges	2965 m 9,728 ft	1355 m 4,446 ft	90.5 km 56.3 mi	20.3648°N 103.4368°W
35	Cerro El Jabalín	Coahuila	Mexican Plateau	3450 m 11,319 ft	1350 m 4,429 ft	84.8 km 52.7 mi	25.1899°N 101.3775°W
36	Cerro El Refugio	Zacatecas; Coahuila	Mexican Plateau	3200 m 10,499 ft	500 m 1,640 ft	73.4 km 45.6 mi	24.5761°N 101.1047°W
37	Cerro Las Palmas	Baja California Sur	Sierra de la Giganta	1750 m 5,741 ft	1240 m 4,068 ft	68.8 km 42.7 mi	26.8612°N 112.4574°W
38	Cerro la Joya	Querétaro	Sierra Madre Oriental	2950 m 9,678 ft	1900 m 6,234 ft	66.1 km 41.1 mi	21.4309°N 99.1326°W
39	Volcán de Tequila	Jalisco	Jalisco	2930 m 9,613 ft	1530 m 5,020 ft	63.4 km 39.4 mi	20.7872°N 103.8468°W
40	Volcán La Malinche (Matlalcuéyetl)	Puebla; Tlaxcala	Trans-Mexican Volcanic Belt	4438 m 14,560 ft	1928 m 6,325 ft	62.5 km 38.8 mi	19.2310°N 98.0320°W

== Gallery ==
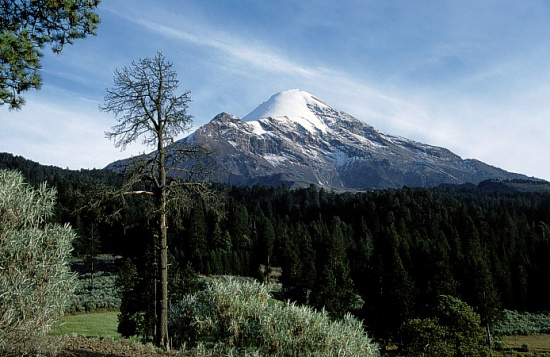
The summit of Pico de Orizaba, a stratovolcano on the border between Puebla and Veracruz, is the highest peak of Mexico.

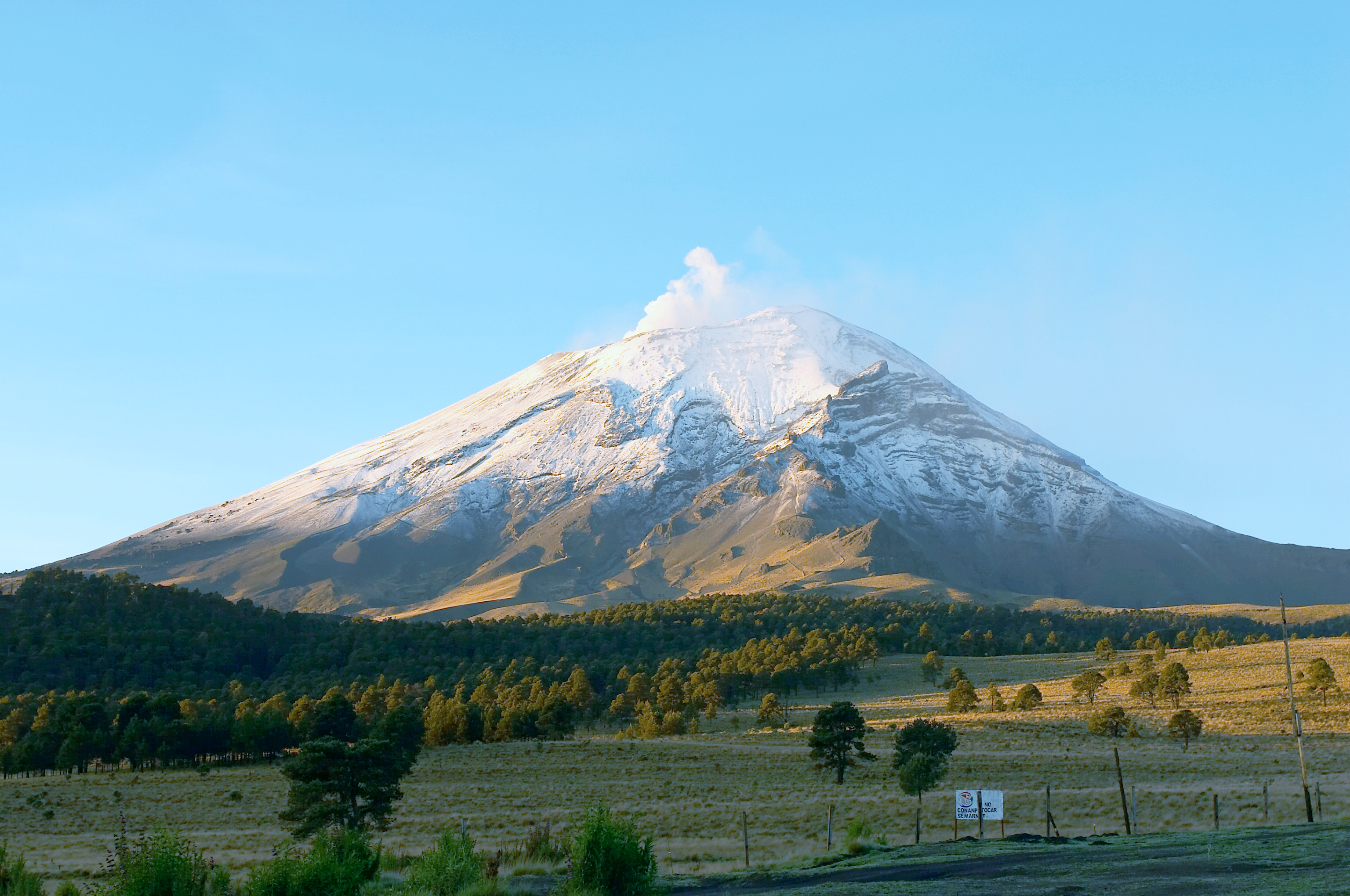
The summit of Volcán Popocatépetl, a stratovolcano at the junction of Puebla, México State, and Morelos, is the second highest peak of Mexico.

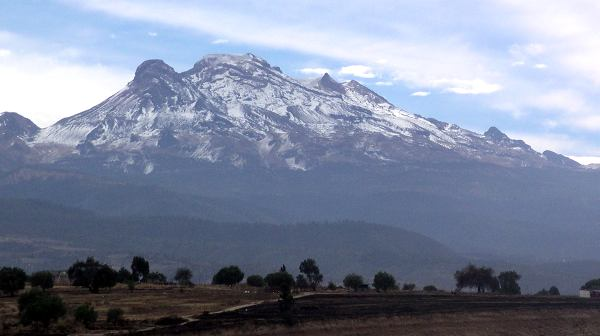
The summit of Volcán Iztaccíhuatl, a stratovolcano on the border between Puebla and México State, is the third highest peak of Mexico.

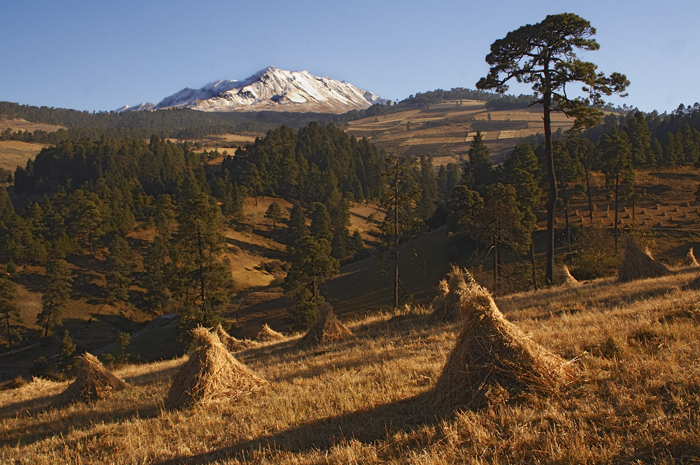
Nevado de Toluca is a stratovolcano in México State.

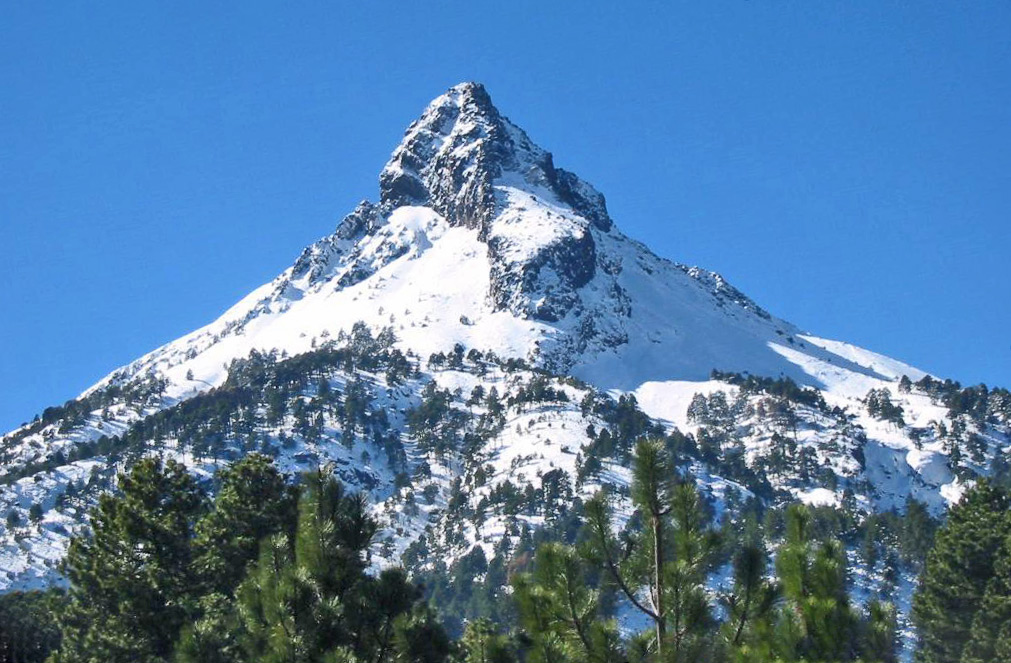
Nevado de Colima is a stratovolcano in Jalisco near the border with Colima.

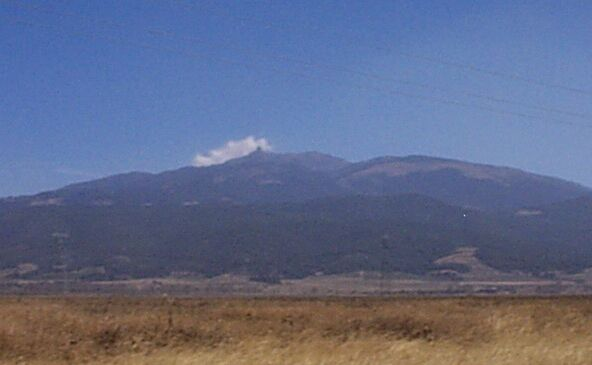
Cofre de Perote is a shield volcano in Veracruz.

== See also ==
- List of mountain peaks of North America
  - List of mountain peaks of Greenland
  - List of mountain peaks of Canada
  - List of mountain peaks of the Rocky Mountains
  - List of mountain peaks of the United States
  - List of mountain peaks of México
    - List of the ultra-prominent summits of México
    - List of extreme summits of México
  - List of mountain peaks of Central America
  - List of mountain peaks of the Caribbean
- Mexico
  - Geography of Mexico
    - Category:Mountains of Mexico
      - commons:Category:Mountains of Mexico
- Physical geography
  - Topography
    - Topographic elevation
    - Topographic prominence
    - Topographic isolation
