= List of ultras of Mexico =

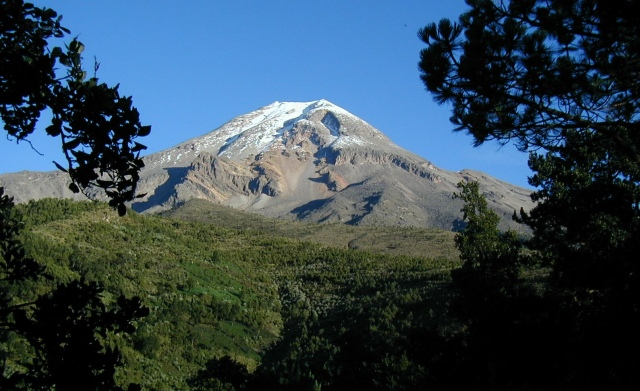
Pico de Orizaba (Citlaltépetl), a stratovolcano on the boundary between the states of Puebla and Veracruz, is the highest mountain peak of México.

The following sortable table comprises the 26 ultra-prominent summits of México. Each of these peaks has at least 1,500 meters (5,000 feet) of topographic prominence.

The summit of a mountain or hill may be measured in three principal ways:

1. The topographic elevation of a summit measures the height of the summit above a geodetic sea level.
2. The topographic prominence of a summit is a measure of how high the summit rises above its surroundings.
3. The topographic isolation (or radius of dominance) of a summit measures how far the summit lies from its nearest point of equal elevation.

Pico de Orizaba exceeds 4,000 meters (13,000 feet) of topographic prominence, Popocatépetl exceeds 3,000 meters (9,800 feet), and Nevado de Colima exceeds 2,500 meters (8,200 feet). Seven mountain peaks of México exceed 2,000 meters (6,600 feet), the following 26 ultra-prominent summits exceed 1,500 meters (4,920 feet), and 42 summits exceed 1,000 meters (3,300 feet) of topographic prominence.

== Ultra-prominent summits ==
Of these 26 ultra-prominent summits of Mexico, four are located in Puebla, four in Oaxaca, four in Nuevo León, three in México, three in Jalisco, two in Veracruz, two in Michoacán, two in Baja California Sur, two in Coahuila, and one each in Morelos, Guerrero, Baja California, Tlaxcala, and Querétaro. Four of these peaks lie on a state border.

The 26 ultra-prominent summits of México
Rank	Mountain Peak	State	Mountain Range	Elevation	Prominence	Isolation	Location
1	Pico de Orizaba (Note: The summit of Pico de Orizaba is the highest point of Estado Libre y Soberano de Puebla, Estado Libre y Soberano de Veracruz de Ignacio de la Llave, and all of México.) (Citlaltépetl)	Puebla; Veracruz	Trans-Mexican Volcanic Belt	5636 m 18,491 ft	4922 m 16,148 ft	2,690.14	19.0305°N 97.2698°W
2	Popocatépetl (Note: Popocatépetl on the border of Puebla is the highest point of both Estado Libre y Soberano de México and Estado Libre y Soberano de Morelos.) (Note: Popocatépetl is the southernmost 5000-meter (16,404-foot) summit of México and greater North America.)	México; Morelos; Puebla	Trans-Mexican Volcanic Belt	5410 m 17,749 ft	3040 m 9,974 ft	143 km 88.8 mi	19.0225°N 98.6278°W
3	Nevado de Colima (Note: The summit of Nevado de Colima is the highest point of Estado Libre y Soberano de Jalisco.) (Note: Nevado de Colima is the northernmost and westernmost 4000-meter (13,123-foot) summit of México.)	Jalisco	Trans-Mexican Volcanic Belt	4270 m 14,009 ft	2720 m 8,924 ft	405 km 252 mi	19.5633°N 103.6087°W
4	Nevado de Toluca (Note: Nevado de Toluca is the westernmost summit of its elevation in México.) (Volcán Xinantécatl)	México	Trans-Mexican Volcanic Belt	4690 m 15,387 ft	2225 m 7,300 ft	118.4 km 73.6 mi	19.1020°N 99.7677°W
5	Cerro Teotepec (Note: The summit of Cerro Teotepec is the highest point of Estado Libre y Soberano de Guerrero.)	Guerrero	Sierra Madre del Sur	3550 m 11,647 ft	2180 m 7,152 ft	185 km 114.9 mi	17.4682°N 100.1364°W
6	Cerro el Nacimiento (Note: The summit of Cerro el Nacimiento is the highest point of Sierra Madre del Sur and Estado Libre y Soberano de Oaxaca.)	Oaxaca	Sierra Madre del Sur	3710 m 12,172 ft	2140 m 7,021 ft	329 km 205 mi	16.2115°N 96.1967°W
7	Picacho del Diablo (Note: The summit of Picacho del Diablo is the highest point of Sierra de San Pedro Mártir and the Baja California Peninsula.) (Note: Picacho del Diablo is the northernmost and westernmost 3000-meter (9843-foot) summit and ultra-prominent summit of México.)	Baja California	Sierra de San Pedro Mártir	3095 m 10,154 ft	2125 m 6,972 ft	335 km 208 mi	30.9925°N 115.3753°W
8	Sierra de Minas Viejas	Nuevo León	Sierra Madre Oriental	2710 m 8,891 ft	1965 m 6,447 ft	54.9 km 34.1 mi	26.1196°N 100.5568°W
9	Cerro Las Conchas	Michoacán	Michoacán	2890 m 9,482 ft	1960 m 6,430 ft	103.3 km 64.2 mi	18.7215°N 102.9740°W
10	La Malinche (volcano) (Note: La Malinche (volcano) on the border of Puebla is the highest point of Tlaxcala.) (Note: La Malinche is the northernmost summit of its elevation in México.) (Matlalcueye)	Puebla; Tlaxcala	Trans-Mexican Volcanic Belt	4430 m 14,534 ft	1920 m 6,299 ft	63.9 km 39.7 mi	19.2310°N 98.0321°W
11	Sierra de la Laguna (Note: The summit of Sierra de la Laguna is the highest point of Sierra San Lazaro and Estado Libre y Soberano de Baja California Sur.)	Baja California Sur	Sierra de la Laguna	2090 m 6,857 ft	1920 m 6,299 ft	343 km 213 mi	23.5392°N 109.9542°W
12	Sierra la Madera	Coahuila	Mexican Plateau	3030 m 9,941 ft	1905 m 6,250 ft	226 km 140.7 mi	27.0345°N 102.3922°W
13	Cerro la Joya	Querétaro	Sierra Madre Oriental	2950 m 9,678 ft	1900 m 6,234 ft	66.1 km 41.1 mi	21.4309°N 99.1326°W
14	Cerro El Potosí (Note: The summit of Cerro El Potosí is the highest point of Estado Libre y Soberano de Nuevo León.)	Nuevo León	Sierra Madre Oriental	3720 m 12,205 ft	1875 m 6,152 ft	571 km 355 mi	24.8719°N 100.2327°W
15	Volcán Tancítaro (Note: The summit of Volcán Tancítaro is the highest point of Estado Libre y Soberano de Michoacán de Ocampo.)	Michoacán	Trans-Mexican Volcanic Belt	3840 m 12,598 ft	1665 m 5,463 ft	136.3 km 84.7 mi	19.4166°N 102.3198°W
16	Cerro El Centinela	Coahuila	Mexican Plateau	3122 m 10,243 ft	1657 m 5,436 ft	186.9 km 116.1 mi	25.1359°N 103.2304°W
17	Picacho San Onofre (Sierra Peña Nevada)	Nuevo León	Sierra Madre Oriental	3550 m 11,647 ft	1650 m 5,413 ft	125 km 77.6 mi	23.8007°N 99.8464°W
18	El Aguacate Oeste	Oaxaca	Sierra Madre del Sur	2830 m 9,285 ft	1650 m 5,413 ft	57.3 km 35.6 mi	16.5812°N 95.8035°W
19	Volcán Las Tres Vírgenes	Baja California Sur	Tres Virgenes	1951 m 6,401 ft	1626 m 5,335 ft	340 km 211 mi	27.4700°N 112.5919°W
20	Sierra de Santa Martha	Veracruz	Trans-Mexican Volcanic Belt	1690 m 5,545 ft	1620 m 5,315 ft	180.1 km 111.9 mi	18.3455°N 94.8576°W
21	Cerro las Capillas	Jalisco	Jalisco	2890 m 9,482 ft	1590 m 5,217 ft	55.8 km 34.7 mi	19.5552°N 104.1472°W
22	Cerro Zempoaltépetl	Oaxaca	Sierra Madre de Oaxaca	3420 m 11,220 ft	1580 m 5,184 ft	103.2 km 64.1 mi	17.1324°N 96.0125°W
23	Iztaccíhuatl (Note: Iztaccíhuatl is the northernmost and westernmost 5000-meter (16,404-foot) summit of México.)	México; Puebla	Trans-Mexican Volcanic Belt	5230 m 17,159 ft	1560 m 5,118 ft	17.51 km 10.88 mi	19.1802°N 98.6415°W
24	Volcán de Tequila	Jalisco	Jalisco	2930 m 9,613 ft	1530 m 5,020 ft	63.4 km 39.4 mi	20.7872°N 103.8468°W
25	Cerro Atravesado (Sierra el Cerro Azul)	Oaxaca	Oaxaca	2310 m 7,579 ft	1510 m 4,954 ft	109.6 km 68.1 mi	16.7652°N 94.4514°W
26	Sierra del Fraile	Nuevo León	Sierra Madre Oriental	2310 m 7,579 ft	1510 m 4,954 ft	26.2 km 16.26 mi	25.8645°N 100.6095°W

== Gallery ==
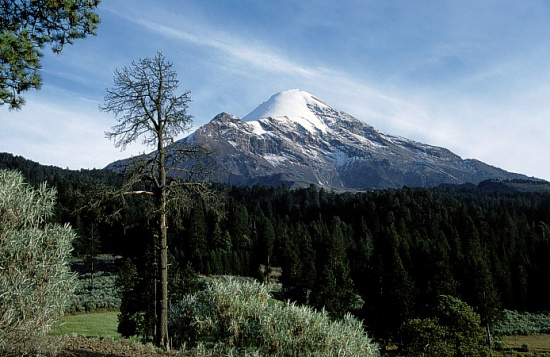
1. The summit of Pico de Orizaba, a stratovolcano on the border between Puebla and Veracruz, is the highest peak of Mexico.

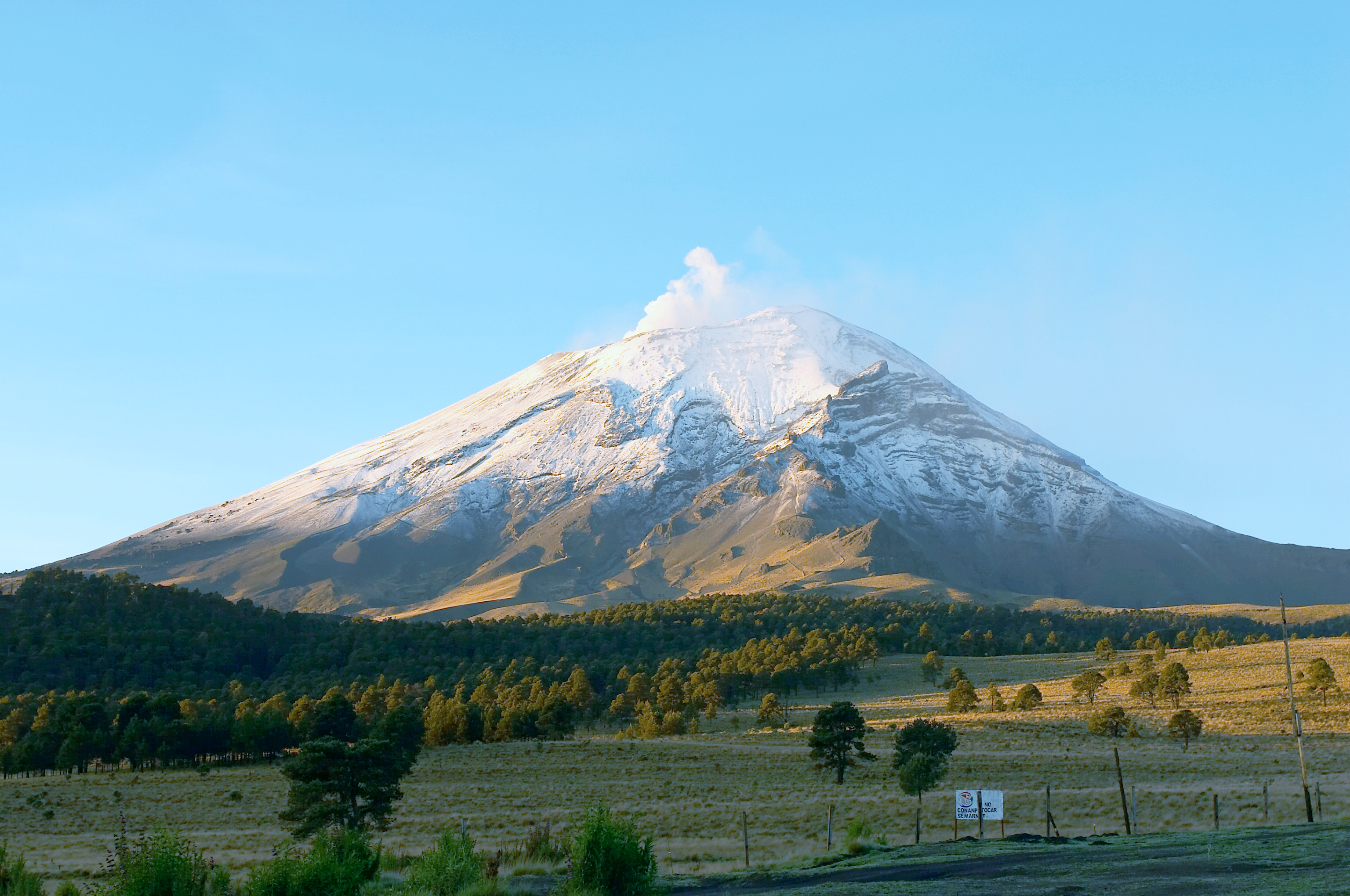
2. The summit of Volcán Popocatépetl, a stratovolcano at the junction of Puebla, México, and Morelos, is the second highest peak of México.

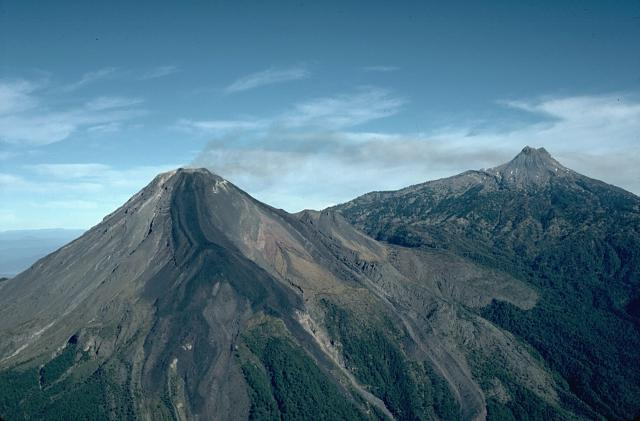
3. Nevado de Colima is a stratovolcano in Colima.

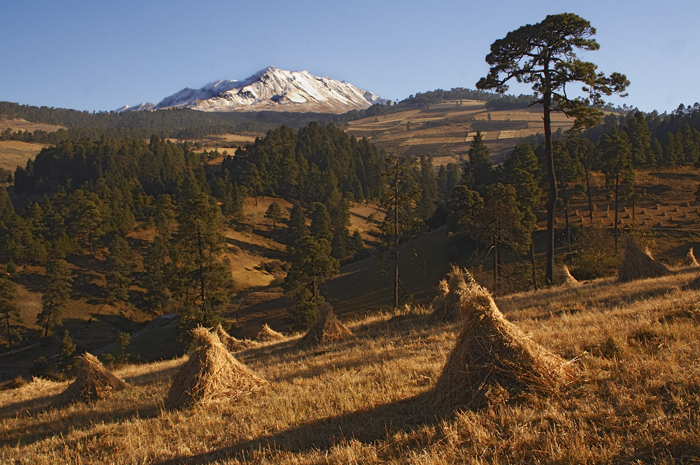
4. Nevado de Toluca is a stratovolcano in México.

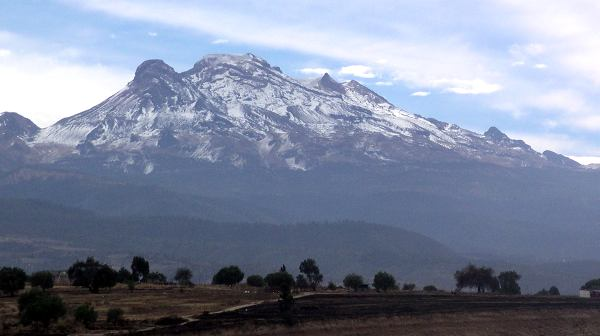
23. The summit of Volcán Iztaccíhuatl, a stratovolcano on the border between Puebla and México, is the third highest peak of México.

== See also ==
- List of mountain peaks of North America
  - List of mountain peaks of Greenland
  - List of mountain peaks of Canada
  - List of mountain peaks of the United States
  - List of mountain peaks of México
    - List of the ultra-prominent summits of México
    - List of extreme summits of México
  - List of mountain peaks of Central America
  - List of mountain peaks of the Caribbean
- Mexico
  - Geography of Mexico
    - Category:Mountains of Mexico
      - commons:Category:Mountains of Mexico
- Physical geography
  - Topography
    - Topographic elevation
    - Topographic prominence
    - Topographic isolation
