= Sierra del Fraile =

Mountain in Nuevo Leon, Mexico

Coordinates: 25°51′50″N 100°36′37″W

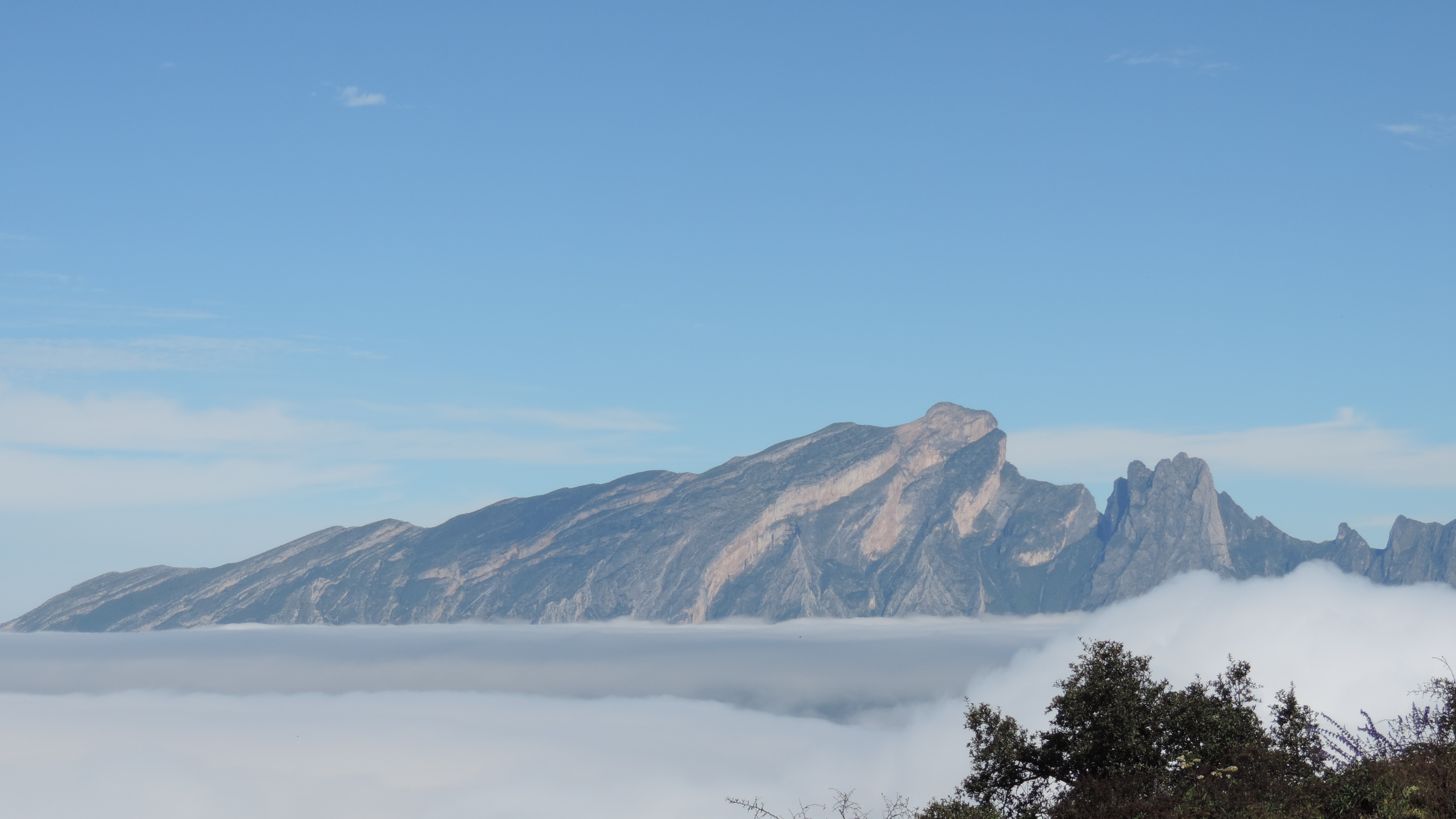
- Sierra del Fraile seen from Mota Chica Mount

Highest point
- Elevation: 2,392 m (7,848 ft)
- Prominence: 1,592 m (5,223 ft)
- Isolation: 23.5 km (14.6 mi)

Geography
- Location within Mexico
- Location: García, Nuevo León
- Country: Mexico
- Parent range: Sierra Madre Oriental

Geology
- Mountain type: Mountain

The Sierra del Fraile (Spanish for 'Friar's Range'), also known as Cerro del Fraile (Spanish for 'Friar's Hill'), is a mountain and a protected area located in the García, Abasolo, Hidalgo, General Escobedo, El Carmen y Mina municipalities in the state of Nuevo León, México. The mountain is part of Sierra Madre Oriental. Its summit elevation is 2,392 m (7,848 ft) AMSL, with a prominence of 1,592 m (5,223 ft); its line parent is Cerro de la Viga. It is an ultra-prominent peak, with a topographic isolation of about 23.5 km (14.6 mi); its nearest highest neighbor is Sierra de San Urbano.

== See also ==
- Cerro Potosí
- Cerro de Chipinque
- Cerro de las Mitras
- Cerro del Topo Chico
- List of Ultras of Mexico
