= Las Derrumbadas =

Mexican volcano

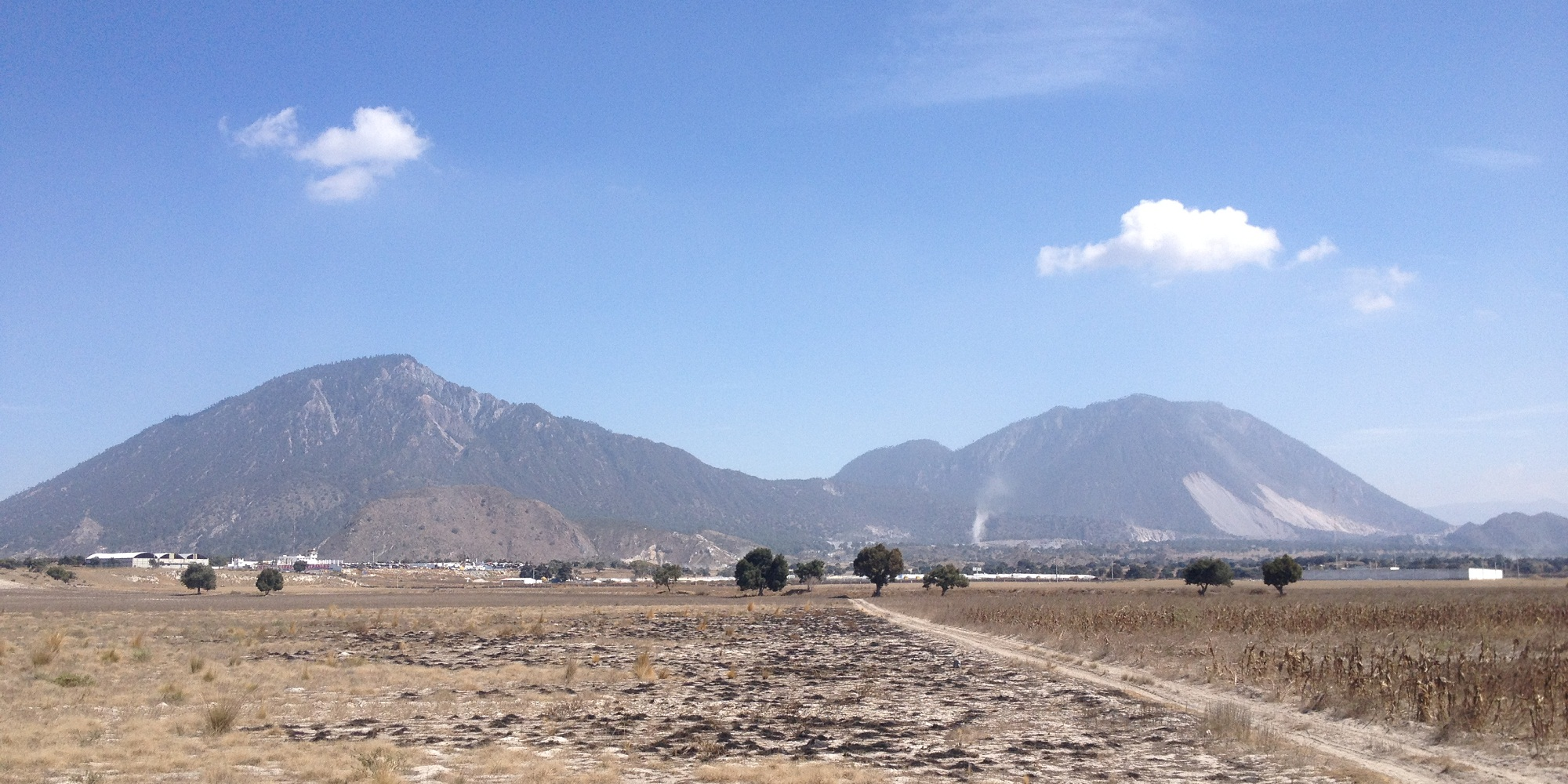
- Las Derrumbadas from San José Zacatepec, Puebla

Highest point
- Elevation: Derrumbada Roja: 3480 m Derrumbada Azul: 3420 m
- Prominence: Derrumbada Roja: ± 1000 m Derrumbada Azul: 640 m
- Listing: Mexico highest major peaks South summit: 22nd North summit: 25th
- Coordinates: 19°17′17″N 97°27′27″W

Geography
- Location within Mexico
- Location: Puebla, Mexico

Geology
- Mountain type: rhyolitic volcano
- Volcanic belt: Trans-Mexican Volcanic Belt

Climbing
- Easiest route: Hike

Las Derrumbadas (from Spanish, meaning 'the collapsed ones' or 'the ones that suffered a stonefall') is a rhyolitic twin dome volcano in the Mexican state of Puebla. Often overlooked for its proximity to some of the country's most famous mountains —including Cofre de Perote, Sierra Negra and colossal Pico de Orizaba— its two summits are nevertheless within the top 30 of the country's highest mountain peaks.

Officially, both mountains are individually called Cerro Derrumbadas. To distinguish them, they are called Derrumbada Roja or Derrumbada de Fuego (Red or Fire Derrumbada, southeastern cone, 3480 m a.s.l.), and Derrumbada Azul or Derrumbada de Agua (Blue or Water Derrumbada, northwestern cone, 3420 m a.s.l.) by the locals. A third mountain, nearby Cerro Pinto, is often included in the Derrumbadas complex, under the name of Derrumbada Blanca (White Derrumbada, 3000 m a.s.l.).

Due to the volcano's fumarolic activity, it has been studied and proposed as a source of geothermal energy.

== See also ==
- Oriental Basin
- List of mountain peaks of Mexico
