= Cerro Mohinora =

Extinct volcano in the Mexican state of Chihuahua

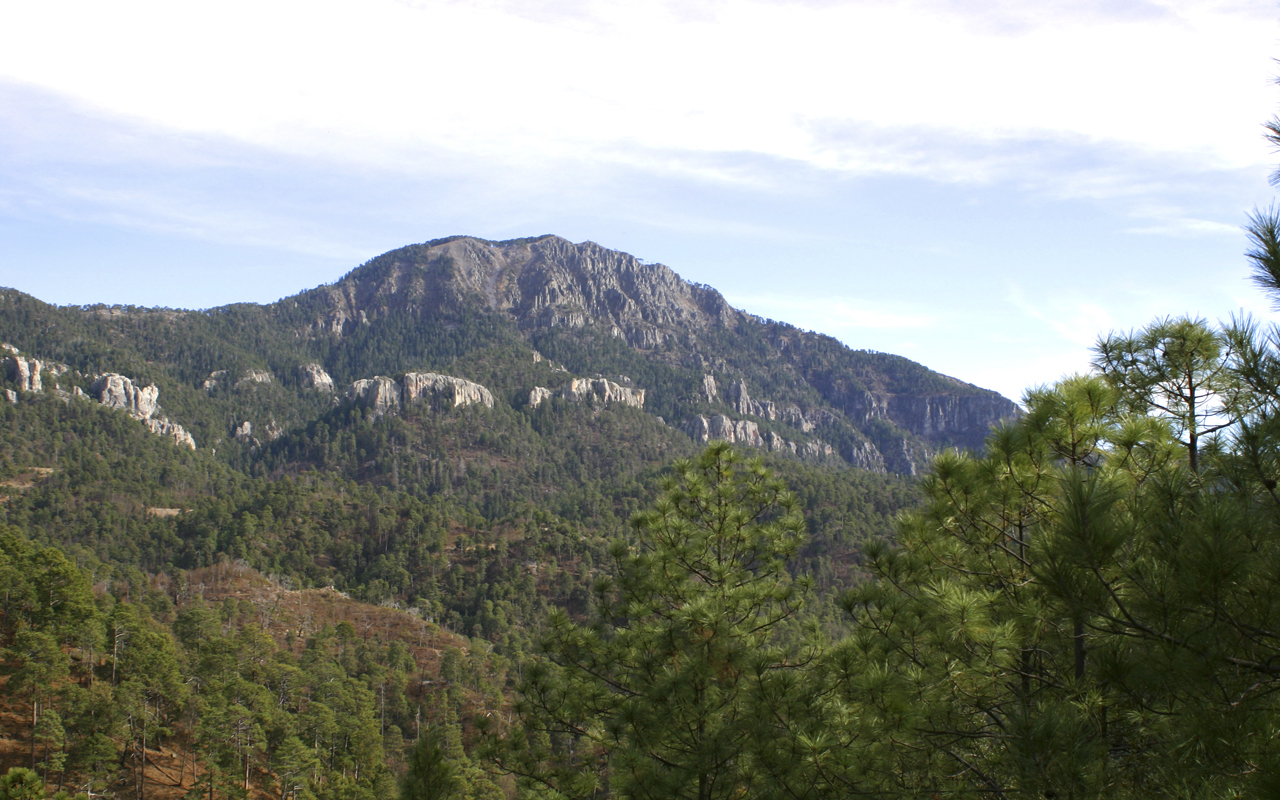

Highest point
- Elevation: 3,300 m (10,800 ft)
- Prominence: 873 m (2,864 ft)
- Parent peak: Cerro Gordo
- Listing: Mountain peaks of Mexico
- Coordinates: 25°57′22″N 107°02′52″W

Geography
- Location within Chihuahua Location within Mexico
- Location: Guadalupe y Calvo Municipality, Chihuahua, Mexico
- Parent range: Sierra Madre Occidental
- Topo map: Mountain Peak

Geology
- Rock age: Paleogene
- Mountain type: Extinct
- IUCN category VI (protected area with sustainable use of natural resources)
- Area: 9,126 ha (35.24 sq mi)
- Designation: flora and fauna protection area
- Designated: 2015
- Administrator: National Commission of Natural Protected Areas

Cerro Mohinora is an extinct volcano that is part of the Sierra Madre Occidental mountain range in the Mexican state of Chihuahua located in the municipality of Guadalupe y Calvo. Cerro Mohinora is the highest point in the state of Chihuahua reaching an elevation of 3,300 m (10,827 ft) above sea level. The climate of the mountain is extremely cold in the winter and temperate to semi-cold in the summer.

== Geology ==
The mountain began to form during Paleogene geologic period characterized by intense volcanic activity in the area throwing lava and ash onto the surrounding plateau and creating the Sierra Madre Occidental. Cerro Mohinora was raised to an elevation over 3,300 m above sea level during the Pleistocene by intense tectonic activity. The mountain is mainly composed of igneous rock.

== Climate ==
Using the Köppen climate classification the climate of the mountain is humid continental climate (Dfb). Summers are cool with temperatures rarely reaching 25 °C (77 °F) and summer lows fall below 10 °C (50 °F) regularly. There are heavy rainstorms from June to October. Winters are very cold with maximum high reaching 0 °C (32 °F) and reaching a maximum low of -31 °C (-24 °F). Winter snowstorms with high winds are common and typically over 1 meter (~3 ft) of snow per season.

== Cerro Mohinora Flora and Fauna Protection Area ==
Cerro Mohinora Flora and Fauna Protection Area was designated in 2015. It covers an area of 91.26 km^{2}, which includes the peak and extends to the north and east.
