= Cofre de Perote =

Inactive volcano in Veracruz, Mexico

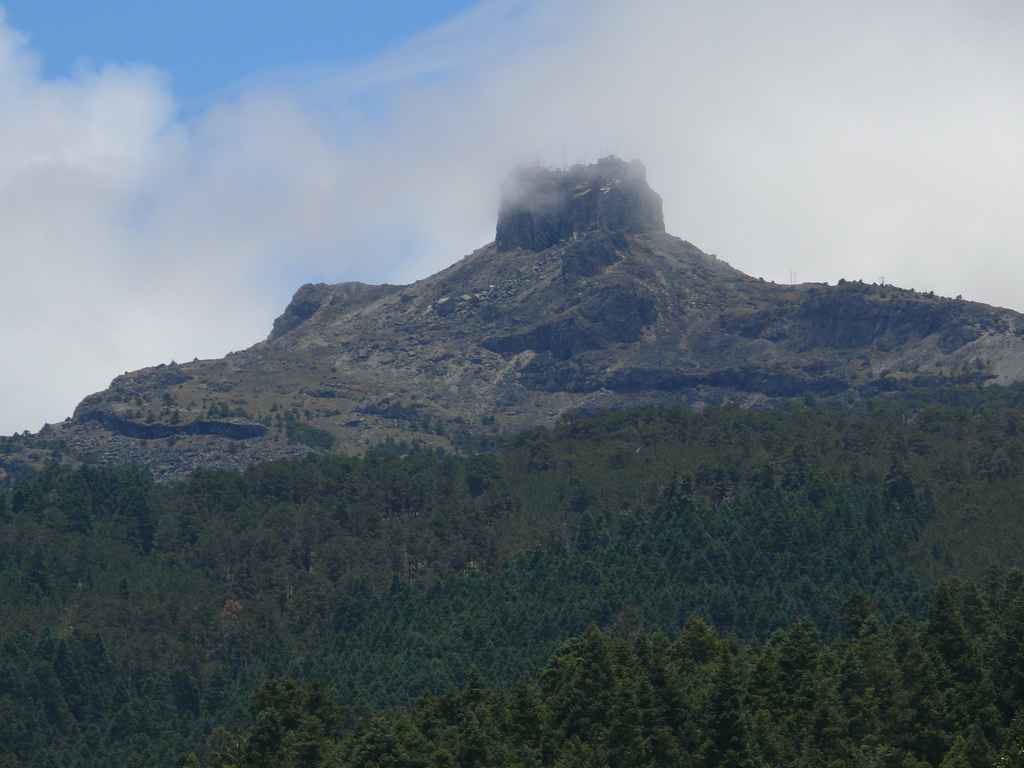
- Cofre de Perote

Highest point
- Elevation: 4,220 m (13,850 ft)
- Prominence: 1,340 m (4,400 ft)
- Listing: North America highest peaks 77th; Mexico highest major peaks 8th
- Coordinates: 19°29.52′N 97°9′W

Geography
- Location: Perote Municipality, Veracruz, Mexico

Geology
- Mountain type: Shield volcano
- Volcanic belt: Trans-Mexican Volcanic Belt
- Last eruption: 1150 CE ± 100 years

Climbing
- Easiest route: rock climb

Cofre de Perote, also known by its Nahuatl names Naupa-Tecutépetl (from Nāuhpa-Tēuctēpetl) and Nauhcampatépetl, both meaning something like "Place of Four Mountains" or "Mountain of the Lord of Four Places", is an inactive volcano located in the Mexican state of Veracruz, at the point where the Trans-Mexican Volcanic Belt, home to all of Mexico's highest peaks, joins the Sierra Madre Oriental. With an elevation of 4,220 metres (13,850 ft) above sea level, Cofre de Perote is Mexico's eighth highest mountain summit.

Cofre de Perote is a shield volcano, shaped very differently from the stratovolcanic Pico de Orizaba, which lies about 50 km (31 mi) to the southwest. A cofre is a coffer, and the name alludes to a volcanic outcropping on the shield which constitutes the peak of the mountain. To the north is the town of Perote, Veracruz, after which the mountain is named.

The area surrounding the volcano was protected by the Mexican government as a national park, known as Cofre de Perote National Park (Spanish: Parque Nacional Cofre de Perote), in 1937.

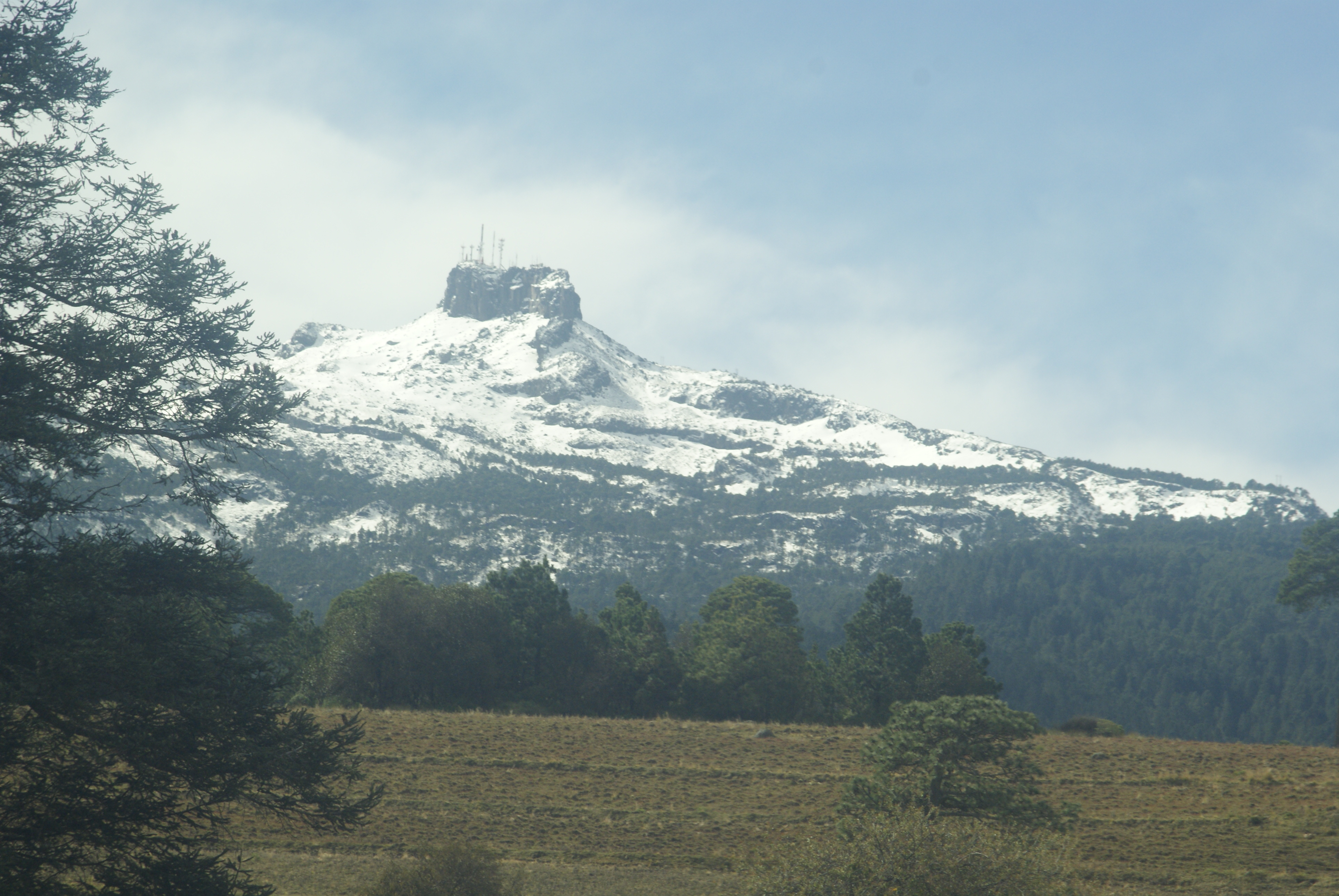
Cofre de Perote in the winter

== Climate ==
Cofre de Perote features a humid alpine climate (Köppen climate classification ET), without a dry season but having a rainier season in summer and autumn.

Climate data for Cofre de Perote
Month	Jan	Feb	Mar	Apr	May	Jun	Jul	Aug	Sep	Oct	Nov	Dec	Year
Mean daily maximum °C (°F)	2.2 (36.0)	4.8 (40.6)	6.1 (43.0)	7.3 (45.1)	8.4 (47.1)	6.7 (44.1)	6.0 (42.8)	7.1 (44.8)	6.8 (44.2)	6.0 (42.8)	5.4 (41.7)	4.5 (40.1)	5.9 (42.7)
Daily mean °C (°F)	−0.1 (31.8)	2.7 (36.9)	3.4 (38.1)	5.1 (41.2)	6.6 (43.9)	5.2 (41.4)	4.1 (39.4)	4.8 (40.6)	5.0 (41.0)	4.2 (39.6)	3.3 (37.9)	2.1 (35.8)	3.9 (39.0)
Mean daily minimum °C (°F)	−2.3 (27.9)	0.7 (33.3)	0.8 (33.4)	3.0 (37.4)	4.9 (40.8)	3.6 (38.5)	2.3 (36.1)	2.6 (36.7)	3.2 (37.8)	2.4 (36.3)	1.2 (34.2)	−0.3 (31.5)	1.8 (35.3)
Average precipitation mm (inches)	41.2 (1.62)	44.2 (1.74)	44.7 (1.76)	61.7 (2.43)	100.7 (3.96)	360.0 (14.17)	422.2 (16.62)	397.6 (15.65)	426.9 (16.81)	200.0 (7.87)	69.0 (2.72)	54.1 (2.13)	2,222.3 (87.48)

== See also ==
- List of mountain peaks of North America
  - List of mountain peaks of Mexico
    - List of volcanoes in Mexico
