= Guadalupe y Calvo Municipality =

Municipality in the Mexican state of Chihuahua

Guadalupe y Calvo
- Municipality
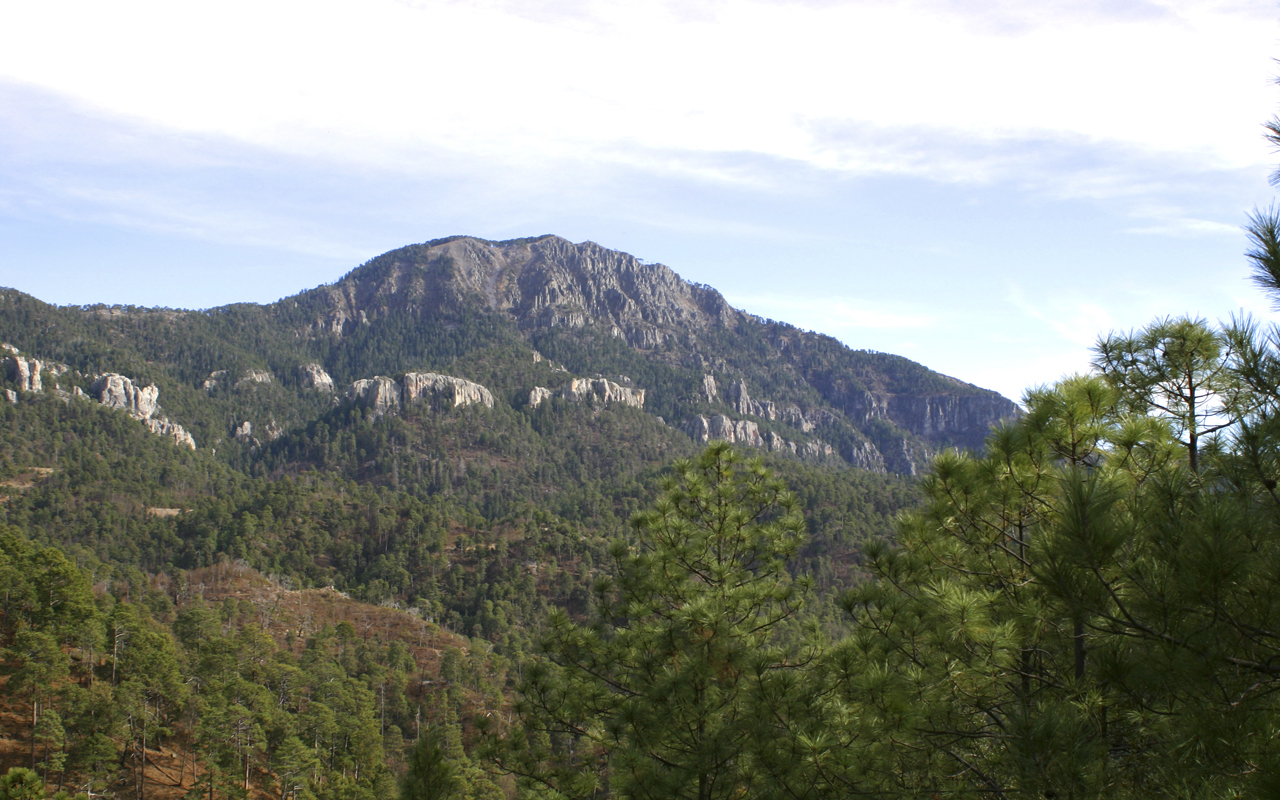
- The Cerro Mohinora

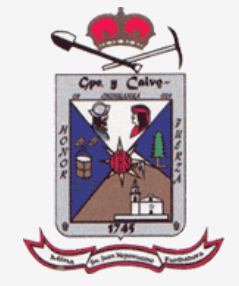
- Coat of arms

- Municipality of Guadalupe y Calvo in Chihuahua

- Location in Mexico
- Coordinates: 26°5′42″N 106°57′52″W
- Country: Mexico
- State: Chihuahua
- Municipal seat: Guadalupe y Calvo

Area
  - Total: 9,165.1 km^{2} (3,538.7 sq mi)

Population (2010)
  - Total: 53,499

Guadalupe y Calvo is one of the 67 municipalities of Chihuahua, in northern Mexico. The municipal seat lies at Guadalupe y Calvo. The municipality covers an area of 9,165.1 km^{2}.

As of 2010, the municipality had a total population of 53,499, up from 51,854 as of 2005.

== Geography ==
=== Towns and villages ===
As of 2010, the town of Guadalupe y Calvo had a population of 5,816. Other than the town of Guadalupe y Calvo, the municipality had 1,416 localities, the largest of which (with 2010 populations in parentheses) were: Baborigame (3,294), classified as urban, and Atascaderos (1,559), Las Yerbitas (Aserradero) (1,200), and Turuachi (1,131), classified as rural.

=== Climate ===
Climate data for Guadalupe y Calvo (1951-2010); elevation 2279 m
Month	Jan	Feb	Mar	Apr	May	Jun	Jul	Aug	Sep	Oct	Nov	Dec	Year
Record high °C (°F)	26.0 (78.8)	30.0 (86.0)	34.0 (93.2)	32.0 (89.6)	34.0 (93.2)	40.0 (104.0)	37.0 (98.6)	35.0 (95.0)	33.0 (91.4)	32.0 (89.6)	38.0 (100.4)	27.0 (80.6)	40.0 (104.0)
Mean daily maximum °C (°F)	16.8 (62.2)	17.8 (64.0)	20.1 (68.2)	23.2 (73.8)	25.9 (78.6)	28.2 (82.8)	25.4 (77.7)	25.3 (77.5)	25.1 (77.2)	23.5 (74.3)	20.8 (69.4)	17.5 (63.5)	22.5 (72.5)
Daily mean °C (°F)	7.5 (45.5)	8.0 (46.4)	9.9 (49.8)	12.9 (55.2)	15.5 (59.9)	18.6 (65.5)	17.7 (63.9)	17.6 (63.7)	17.1 (62.8)	14.3 (57.7)	10.8 (51.4)	8.4 (47.1)	13.2 (55.8)
Mean daily minimum °C (°F)	−1.7 (28.9)	−1.7 (28.9)	−0.3 (31.5)	2.6 (36.7)	5.1 (41.2)	8.9 (48.0)	10.0 (50.0)	9.9 (49.8)	9.0 (48.2)	5.2 (41.4)	0.9 (33.6)	−0.8 (30.6)	3.9 (39.0)
Record low °C (°F)	−13.0 (8.6)	−11.0 (12.2)	−10.0 (14.0)	−7.0 (19.4)	−4.0 (24.8)	1.0 (33.8)	3.0 (37.4)	4.0 (39.2)	1.0 (33.8)	−5.0 (23.0)	−7.0 (19.4)	−12.0 (10.4)	−13.0 (8.6)
Average precipitation mm (inches)	63.3 (2.49)	46.5 (1.83)	22.1 (0.87)	20.4 (0.80)	18.6 (0.73)	103.5 (4.07)	286.9 (11.30)	249.1 (9.81)	164.2 (6.46)	58.6 (2.31)	40.1 (1.58)	84.9 (3.34)	1,158.2 (45.60)
Average precipitation days (≥ 0.1 mm)	4.6	3.7	1.8	2.2	2.7	11.5	25.8	24.1	16.3	5.9	3.1	5.4	107.1
Source: Servicio Meteorológico National
