= Volcán de Colima =

Volcano in Mexico

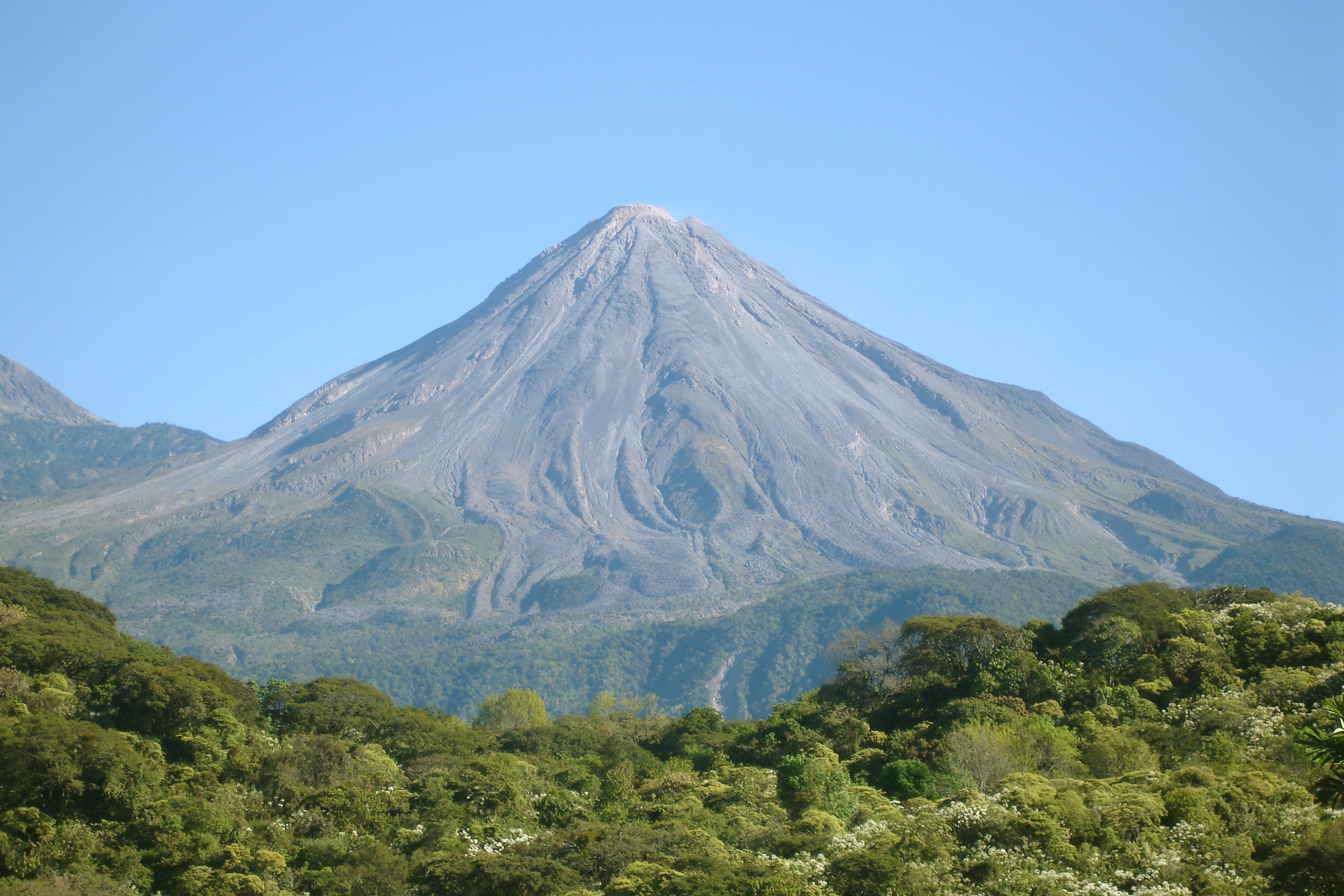
- Volcán de Colima in 2009

Highest point
- Elevation: 4,260 m (13,980 ft)
- Prominence: 600 m (2,000 ft)
- Listing: North America highest peak 60th; North America prominent 25th; North America isolated peak 46th; Mexico highest major peaks
- Coordinates: 19°30′46″N 103°37′02″W

Geography
- Location within Mexico
- Location: Jalisco / Colima, Mexico
- Parent range: Trans-Mexican Volcanic Belt

Geology
- Rock age: 5 million years
- Mountain type: Stratovolcano
- Volcanic belt: Trans-Mexican Volcanic Belt
- Last eruption: October 17, 2023

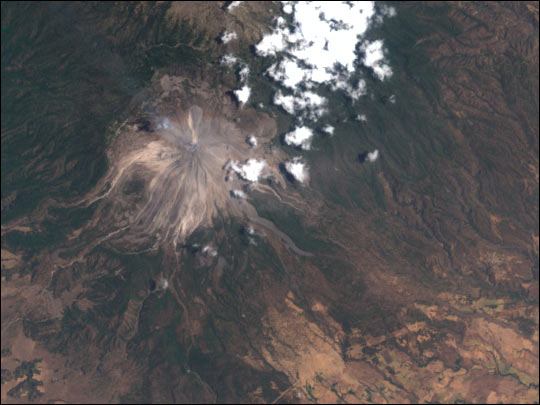
Colima volcano as seen by the Landsat satellite

The Volcán de Colima, 4,260 m (13,980 ft), also known as Volcán de Fuego, is part of the Colima Volcanic Complex (CVC) consisting of Volcán de Colima, Nevado de Colima (Spanish pronunciation: [neˈβaðo ðe koˈlima]) and the eroded El Cántaro (listed as extinct). It is the youngest of the three and as of 2015 is one of the most active volcanoes in Mexico and in North America. Having been active for nearly 5 million years, and with frequent eruptions, the Volcán de Colima is considered a stratovolcano. It has erupted more than 40 times since 1576. One of the largest eruptions was on January 20–24, 1913. Nevado de Colima, also known as Tzapotépetl, lies 5 kilometres (3.1 mi) north of its more active neighbor and is the taller of the two at 4,271 meters (14,012 feet). It is the 25th-most prominent peak in North America.

Despite its name, only a fraction of the volcano's surface area is in the state of Colima; the majority of its surface area lies over the border in the neighboring state of Jalisco, toward the western end of the Trans-Mexican Volcanic Belt. It is about 485 km (301 mi) west of Mexico City and 125 km (78 mi) south of Guadalajara, Jalisco.

Since 1869–1878, a parasitic set of domes, collectively known as El Volcancito, has formed on the northeast flank of the main cone of the volcano.

== Geological history ==
In the late Pleistocene era, a huge landslide occurred at the mountain, with approximately 25 km^{3} (6.0 mi^{3}) of debris traveling some 120 km, reaching the Pacific Ocean. An area of some 2,200 km^{2} was covered in landslide deposits. The currently active cone is within a large caldera that was probably formed by a combination of landslides and large eruptions. The lava is andesite containing 56-61% SiO_{2}. About 300,000 people live within 40 km (25 mi) of the volcano, which makes it the most dangerous volcano in Mexico. In light of its history of large eruptions and situation in a densely populated area, it was designated a Decade Volcano, singling it out for study.

== Current activity ==
In recent years, there have been frequent temporary evacuations of nearby villagers due to threatening volcanic activity. Eruptions have occurred in 1991, 1998–1999 and from 2001 to the present day, with activity being characterized by extrusion of viscous lava forming a lava dome, and occasional larger explosions, forming pyroclastic flows and dusting the areas surrounding the volcano with ash and tephra.

The largest eruption for several years occurred on May 24, 2005. An ash cloud rose to more than 3 km over the volcano and satellite monitoring indicated that the cloud spread over an area extending 110 nautical miles (200 km) west of the volcano in the hours after the eruption. Pyroclastic flows travelled 4–5 km from the vent, and lava bombs landed 3–4 km away. Authorities set up an exclusion zone within 6.5 km of the summit.

On November 21, 2014, the volcano erupted again. An ash column was sent 5 km into the air, covering towns as far as 25 km away in ash. No fatalities were reported, and no evacuations took place. There were eruptions on January 10, 21 and 25, with the ash from the January 21 eruption falling in towns more than 15 miles (24 km) away.

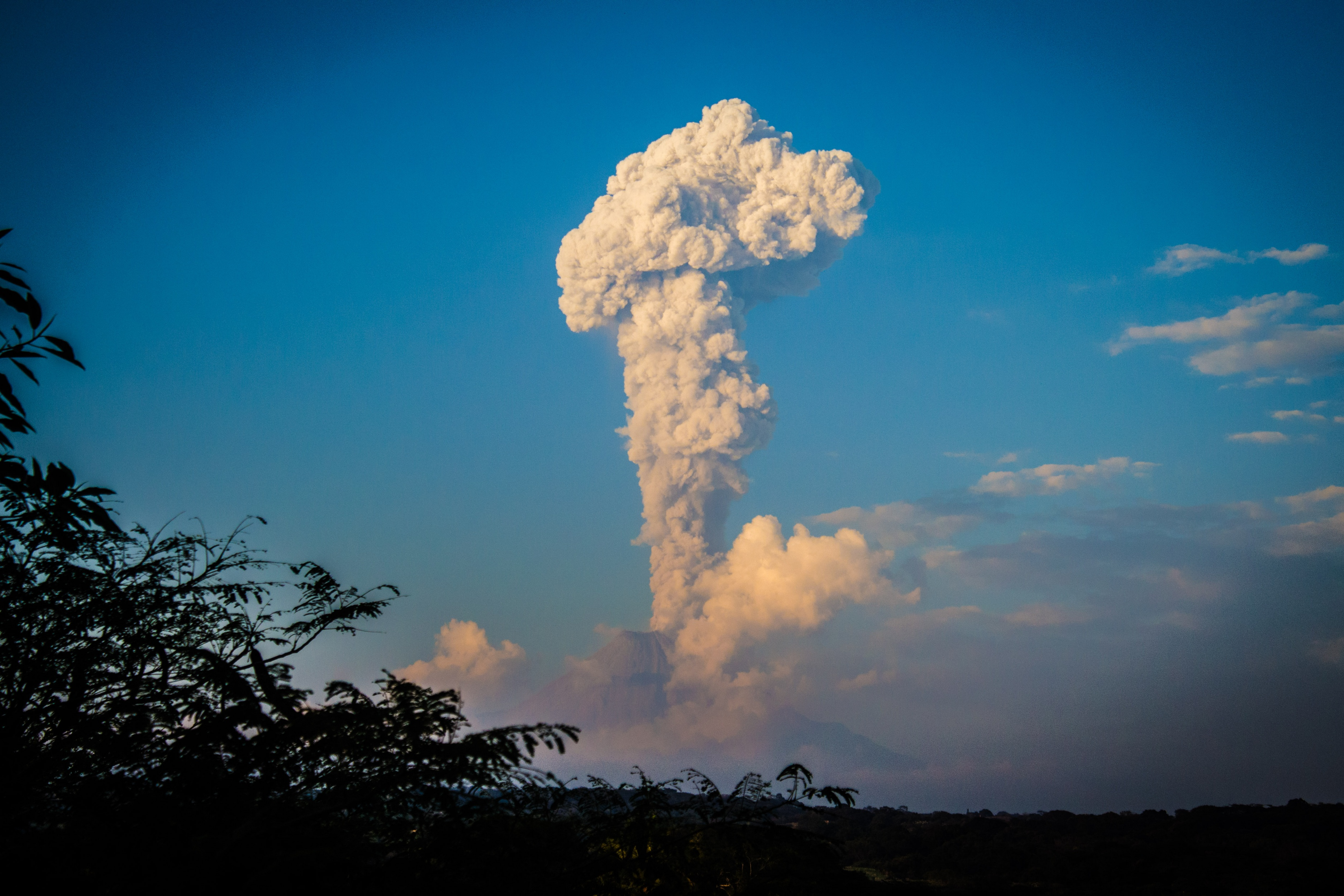
Plume of ash, December 17, 2016, 5h PM.

On 10 July 2015, there was another eruption. Another eruption occurred on September 25, 2016, sending a plume of ash and smoke 10,000 feet (3,000 m) into the sky. During December 2016, ash plumes occurred once or twice a day. On December 18, 2016, there were three eruptions. The biggest columns of ash reached 2 kilometers in height.

Colima volcano experienced another strong explosion at 06:27 UTC (00:27 CST) on January 18, 2017. The eruption spewed volcanic ash up to 4 km (13,123 feet) above the crater.

As of September 2025, the last eruption occurred between October 11 and October 17, 2023. 3 lahars travelled down the volcanoes flanks, partially due to Hurricane Lidia. Steam and gas emissions were low and rose from the northeast part of the crater.

== Volcanological center ==
The volcano is monitored by the Colima Volcano Observatory at the University of Colima, Mexico. A team analyzes, interprets and communicates every event that occurs at this volcano.

In 2018, a webcam was installed close to the volcano, and volcanic activity can be seen in real-time.
