= Cerro Potosí =

Mountain in Nuevo León, Mexico

Cerro El Potosí
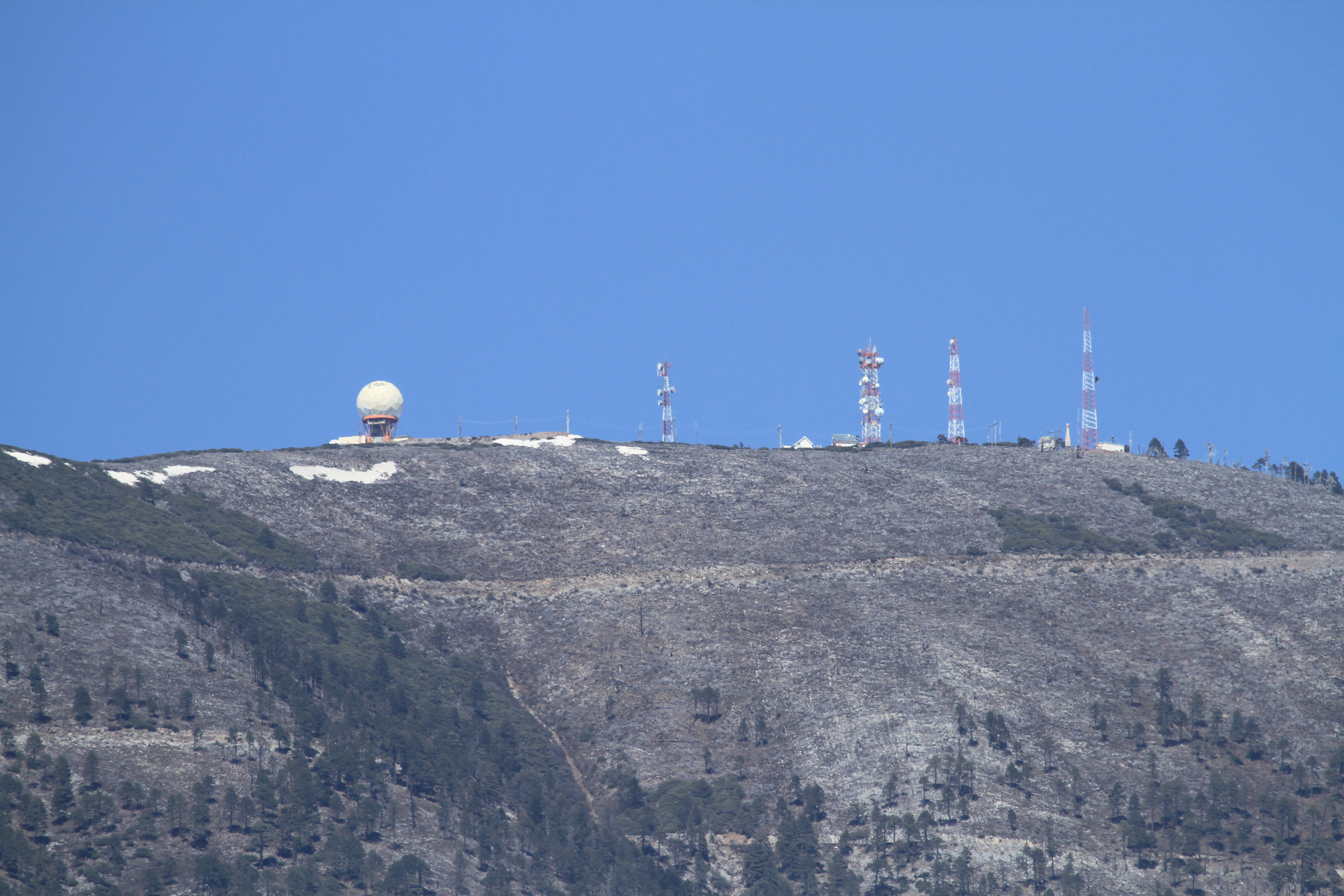
- Cerro Potosí in the end of winter, viewed from Pozo del Gavilán.

Highest point
- Elevation: 3,747 m (12,293 ft)
- Prominence: 1,876 m (6,155 ft)
- Listing: North America isolated peaks 25th; Ultra prominent peak
- Coordinates: 24°52′18″N 100°13′57″W

Geography
- Location within Mexico
- Location: Galeana, Nuevo León, Mexico
- Parent range: Sierra Madre Oriental

Climbing
- Easiest route: road

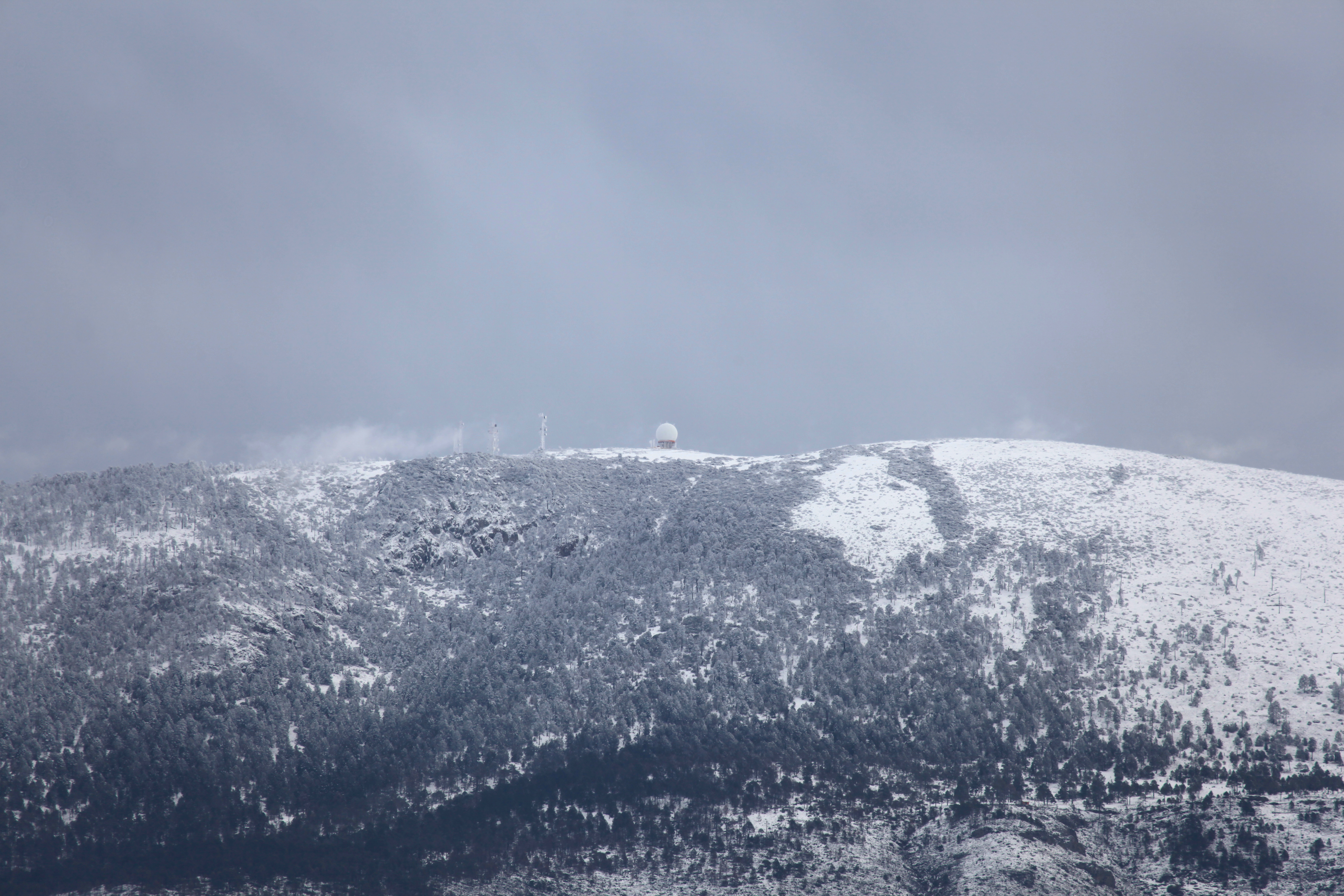
Cerro Potosí in winter, viewed from the Mexico 57 highway to the west. Microwave relay station visible on summit.

Cerro El Potosí is the highest mountain in the Sierra Madre Oriental mountain range of northeast Mexico. It is located in the state of Nuevo León, about 80 km (50 mi) south of Monterrey.

== Flora and fauna ==
This limestone mountain supports a very diverse flora including several endemic or near-endemic species, such as the Potosi Pinyon. At the foot of the mountain, a series of springs and endorheic basins were the only site in which the pupfish Cyprinodon alvarezi and Megupsilon aporus, and the dwarf crayfish Cambarellus alvarezi lived. The last two are entirely extinct, while Cyprinodon alvarezi is extinct in the wild (only survives in captivity).

== Access ==
Access was very difficult in the past, but in the 1960s a microwave relay station was built on the summit, with the road built for this providing easy access from the east.

== Protected areas ==
In 2000 the upper slopes of the mountain were designated an ecological reserve, covering 9.02 km^{2}. A northern portion of the mountain, including the actual summit, are in the Cuenca Alimentadora del Distrito Nacional de Riego 026 Bajo Río San Juan, a natural resources protection area.

== See also ==
- Mountain peaks of México
- Mountain peaks of North America
- List of Ultras of Mexico
