= Cerro de la Viga =

Mountain in Nuevo León, Mexico

- Sierra de la Viga; Cerro San Rafael
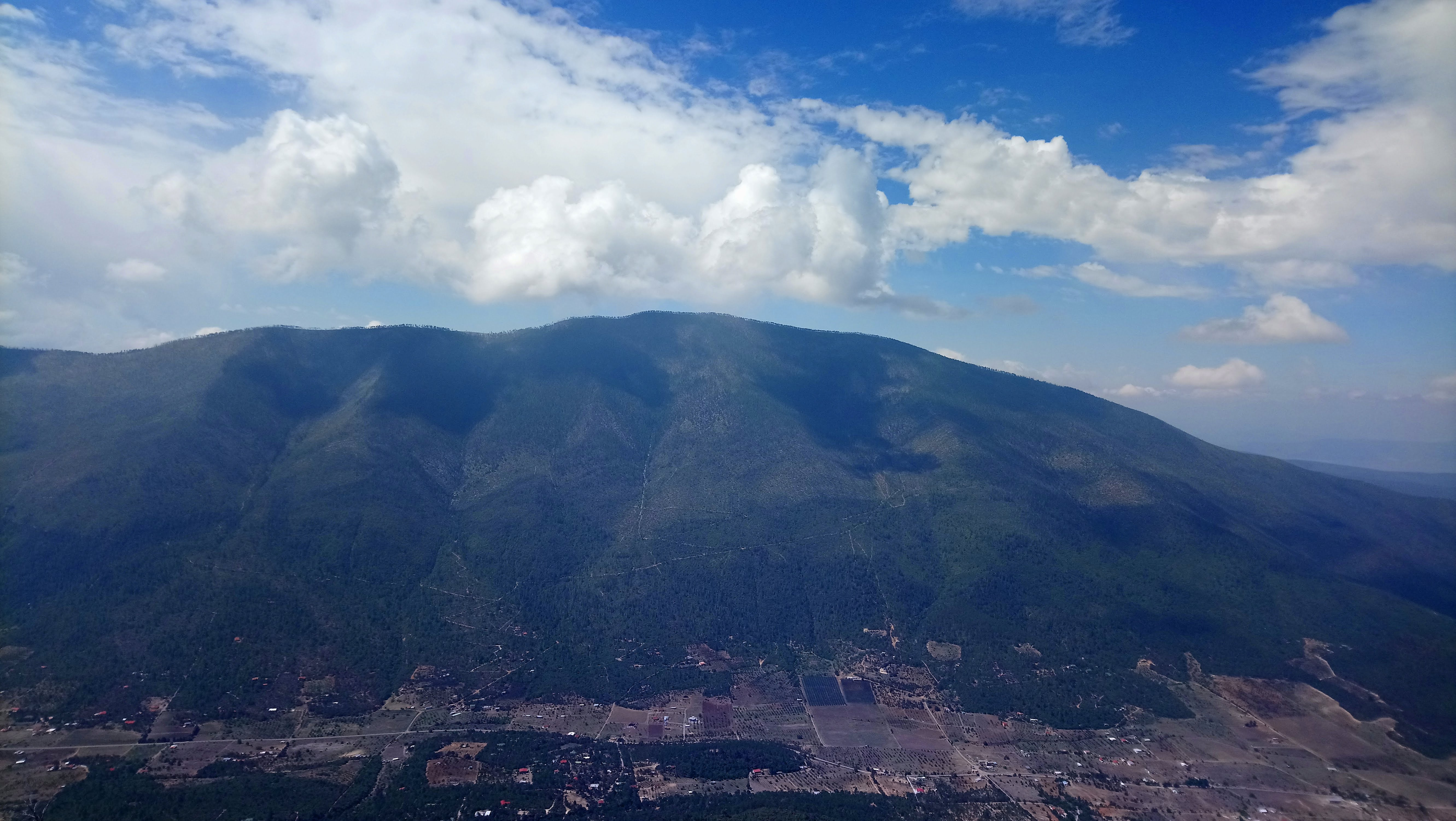
- Cerro de la Viga seen from the Cerro Rancho Nuevo

Highest point
- Elevation: 3,712 m (12,178 ft)
- Prominence: 1,395 m (4,577 ft)
- Coordinates: 25.3637°N 100.5571°W

Geography
- Location within Coahuila
- Location: Arteaga, Coahuila; Santiago, Nuevo León
- Parent range: Sierra Madre Oriental

The Cerro de la Viga is a mountain located in the municipalities of Arteaga, Coahuila and Santiago, Nuevo León in northeastern Mexico. Its peak named Cerro San Rafael culminates at 3,712 m above the sea level and has a prominence of 1,395 m. It is the highest point in Coahuila and the second highest point in the Sierra Madre Oriental and in northern Mexico. The mountain is surrounded by the Cerro Rancho Nuevo, Sierra El Álamo, Sierra San Isidro, Sierra Mauricio, Sierra El Muerto (Santiago), El Coahuilón, Sierra Las Alazanas and Cerro La Mina.

Its 40-km-long ridge is the border between Coahuila and Nuevo León over 22 km.

In June 2011, a fire affected the southern side of the mountain.

== See also ==
- List of mountain peaks of Mexico
