= Pico del Águila =

Mountain in Cumbres del Ajusco National Park

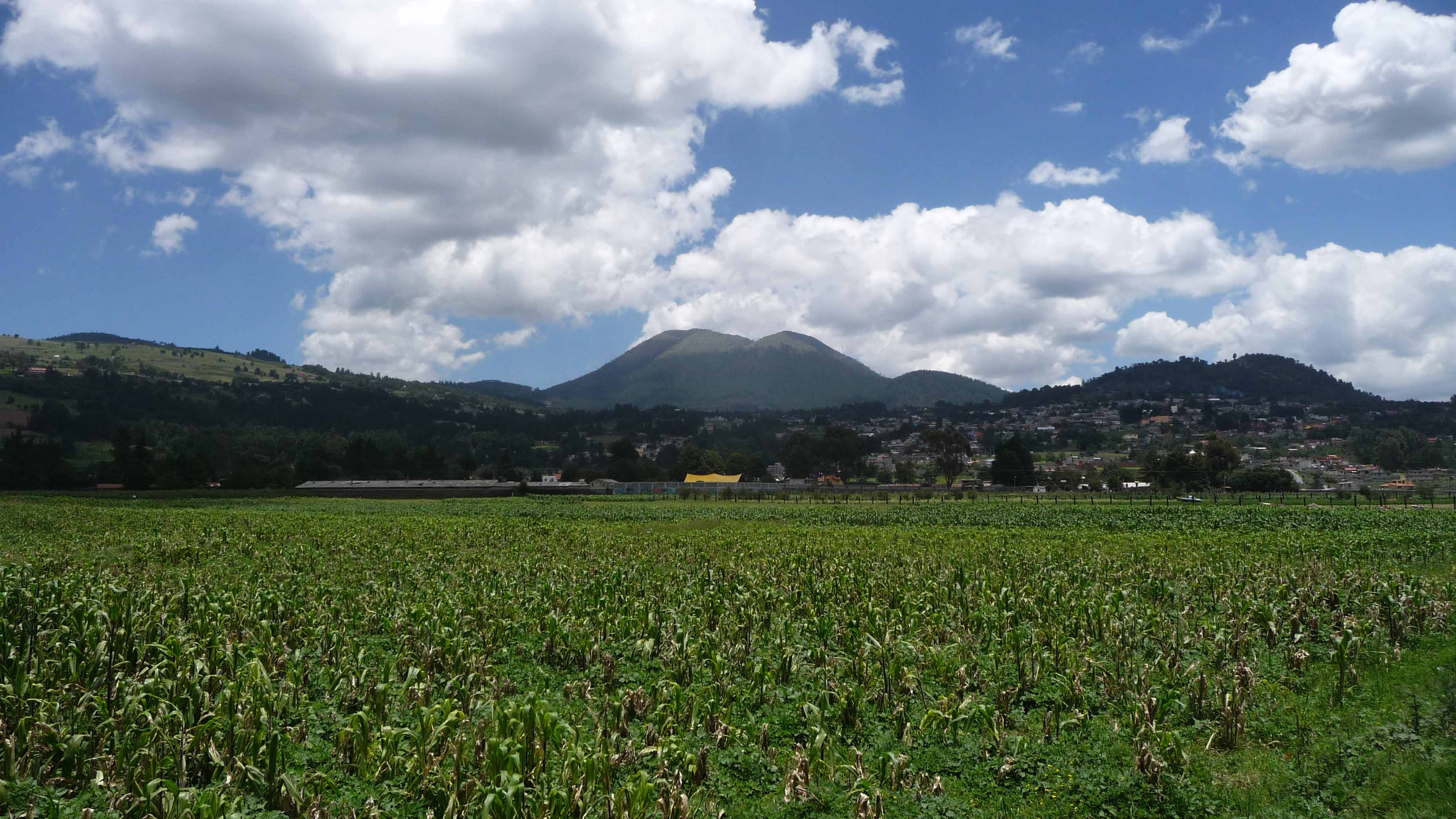

Highest point
- Elevation: 3,900 metres (12,800 ft)
- Coordinates: 19°12′46.8″N 99°15′25.2″W

Geography
- Location within Mexico
- Location: Mexico City
- Topo map: Part of the neovolcanic axis

Geology
- Last eruption: Not erupted

Climbing
- Easiest route: Taking the Picacho-Ajusco road from Periferico sur expressway at the point of Channel 13 TV studios, then Circuito Ajusco the easy way(by a road) is when you reach the intersection with Road to Jalatlaco is shorter and the highest point that you can access from the road then you need to climb to the top (WARNING, be sure that you wear high boots or protect your legs in the area is high grass and thorns even crotals so be careful you can carry a wooden rod for helping you)

Pico del Águila is a peak of the mountain range called Ajusco Volcano 3,937 mt, located in Cumbres del Ajusco National Park (other Volcanoes that form part of the same area are: Malinali, Mezontepec, Pelado, Oyameyo, Malacatepec, Couepil, Cictontle, Xitli (or Xitle, this last erupted at the southern outskirts of Mexico City), in the borough of Tlalpan. It is a popular Sunday hike, and can be climbed in about two hours.
