= Cerro San José =

Mountain in Mexico

Coordinates: 30°33′N 108°39′W

Cerro San José is a mountain found on the boundary between the Mexican states of Chihuahua and Sonora. The peak is 2,700 metres (8,858 ft) above sea level. The mountain is located in Janos Municipality in Chihuahua, and Bavispe Municipality in Sonora.
