= Cerro Teotepec =

Mountain in Mexico

- Location within Guerrero

Highest point
- Elevation: 3,540 m (11,610 ft)
- Prominence: 2,160 m (7,090 ft)
- Coordinates: 17°28′7″N 100°8′13″W

Geography
- Location: Atoyac de Álvarez and General Heliodoro Castillo; Guerrero, Mexico
- Parent range: Sierra Madre del Sur

Cerro Teotepec or Cerro Tiotepec is a mountain summit located in the Mexican state of Guerrero. It is 3,550 meters high and is located in the Sierra Madre del Sur mountain range. It is located in the municipalities of Atoyac de Álvarez and General Heliodoro Castillo.
