= Sierra Madre Oriental =

Mountain range in Mexico

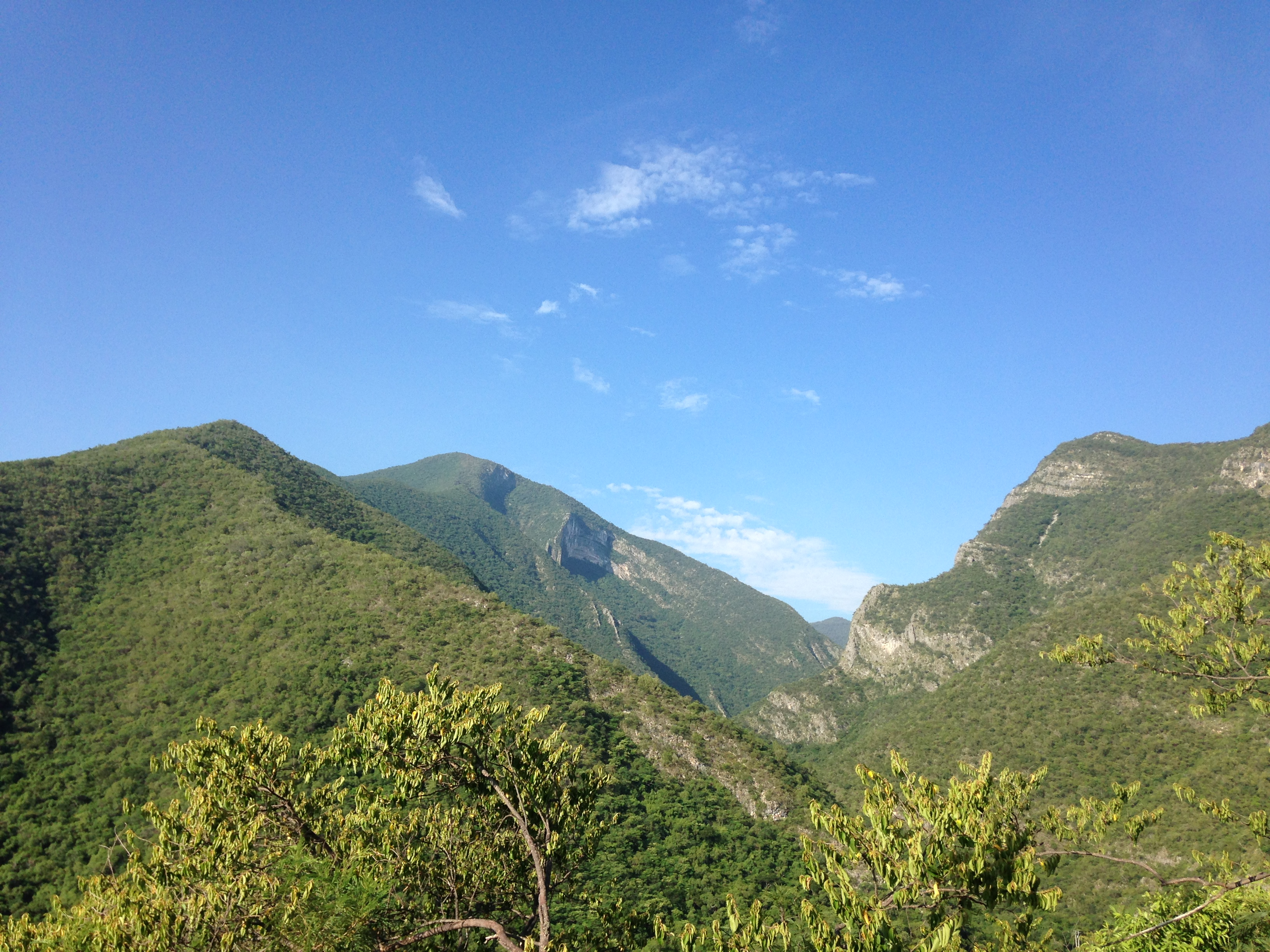
- Sierra Madre Oriental near Ciudad Victoria, Tamaulipas

Highest point
- Peak: Cerro El Potosí
- Elevation: 3,721 m (12,208 ft)
- Prominence: 1,855 m (6,086 ft)
- Coordinates: 25°22′N 100°33′W

Geography
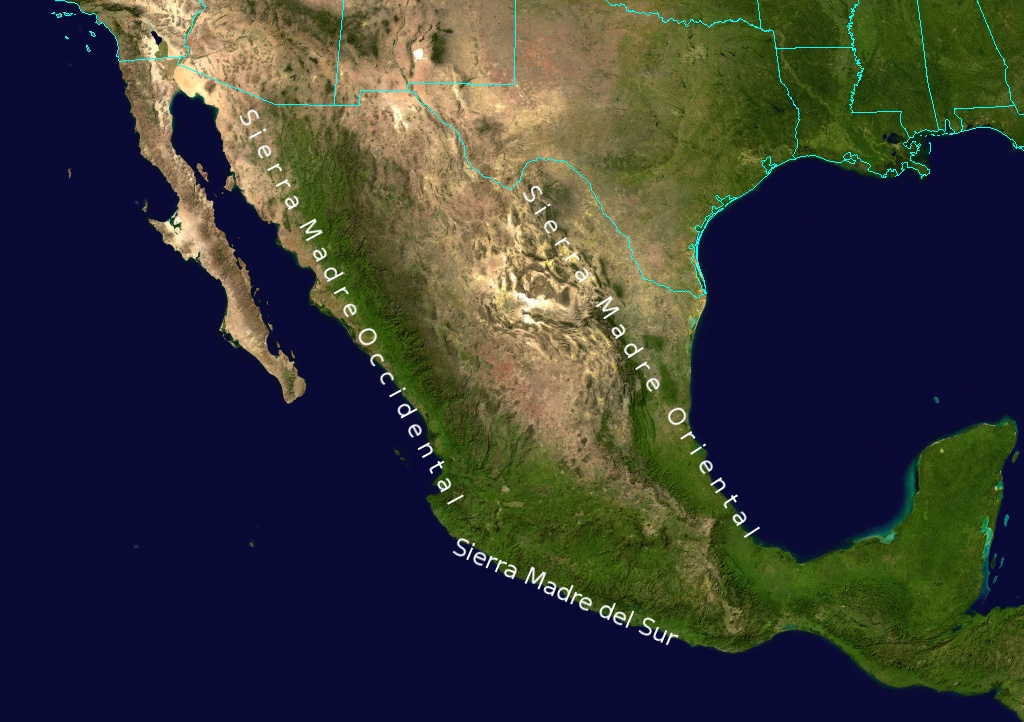
- Country: Mexico
- States: Coahuila; Nuevo León; Tamaulipas; San Luis Potosí; Hidalgo; Puebla; Querétaro

The Sierra Madre Oriental (Spanish: [ˈsjera ˈmaðɾe oɾjenˈtal]) is a mountain range located in northeastern Mexico. The Sierra Madre Oriental is part of the American Cordillera, a chain of mountain ranges (cordillera) that consists of an almost continuous sequence of mountain ranges that form the western "backbone" of North America, Central America, South America, and Antarctica.

== Setting ==
Spanning 1,000 kilometres (620 mi) the Sierra Madre Oriental runs from the Rio Grande on the border between Coahuila and Texas south through Nuevo León, southwest Tamaulipas, San Luis Potosí, Querétaro, and Hidalgo to northern Puebla, where it joins with the east-west running Eje Volcánico Transversal of central Mexico. The northernmost are the Sierra del Burro and the Sierra del Carmen which reach the border with the United States at the Rio Grande. North of the Rio Grande, the range continues northwestward into Texas and beyond as the Davis and Guadalupe Ranges.

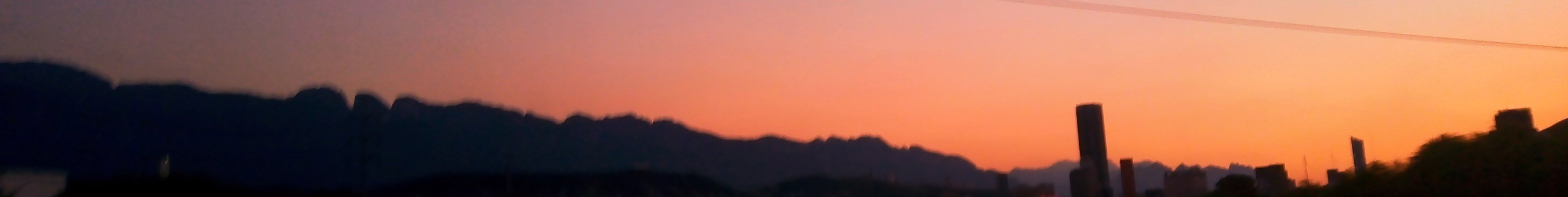
Sierra Madre Oriental in San Pedro Garza Garcia, Nuevo Leon.

Mexico's Gulf Coastal Plain lies to the east of the range, between the mountains and the Gulf of Mexico coast. The Mexican Plateau, which averages 1,100 metres (3,600 ft) in elevation, lies between the Sierra Madre Oriental and the Sierra Madre Occidental further west.

The climate of the Sierra Madre Oriental is drier than the rainforest areas further south. The Serranias del Burro in the northern range is much drier, semi-arid to arid, yet annually orographically induces and/or intensifies notably vigorous thunderstorm activity in April and May. This small region consistently is a particularly active area for supercells with significantly severe hail and tornadoes, which first form over to just leeward of the mountains then move eastward, sometimes hundreds of kilometres (miles) past the Rio Grande River into Texas.

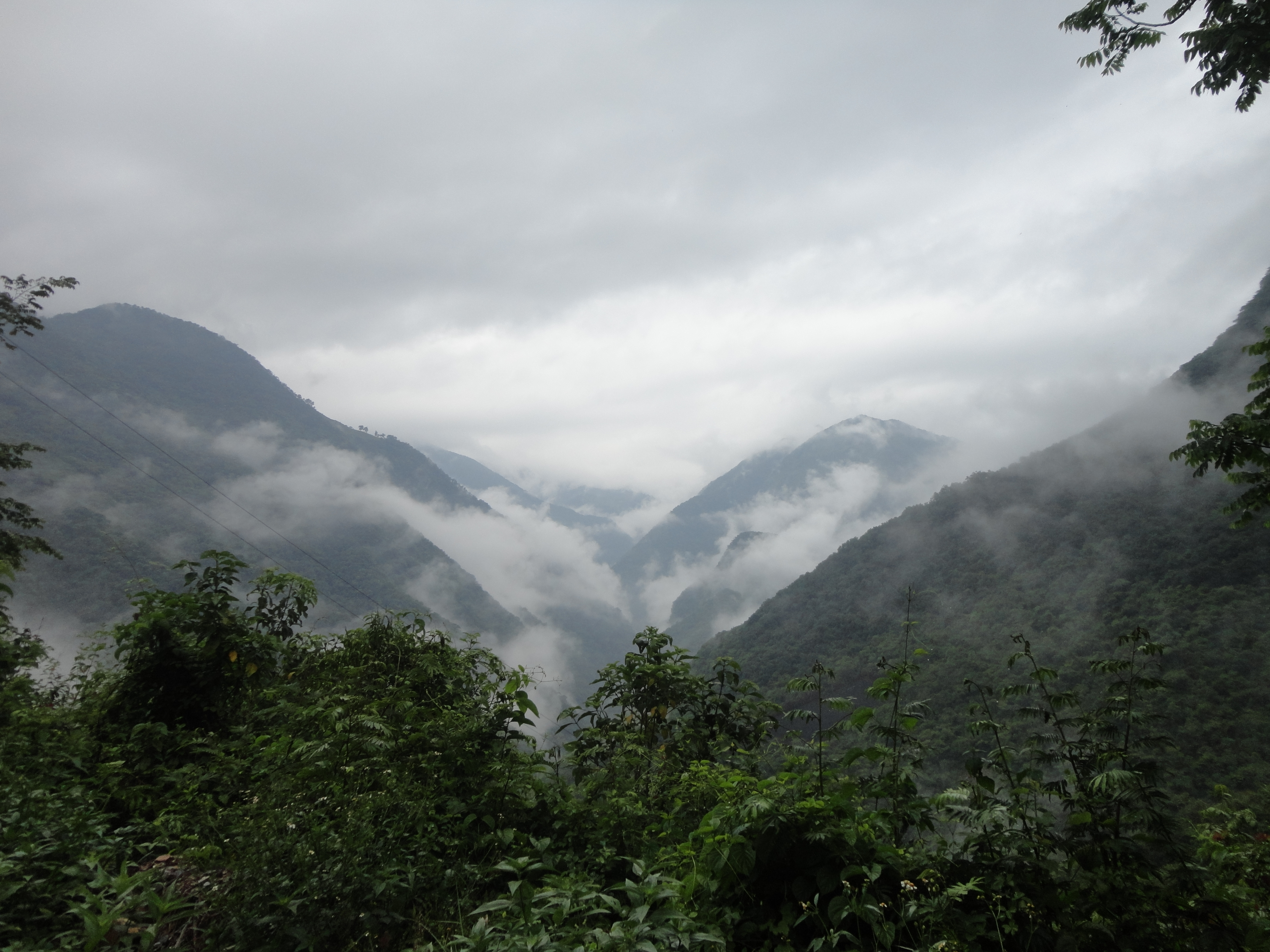
The Sierra Madre Oriental in Hidalgo state.

== Highest major summits ==
Cerro El Potosí, at 3,721 metres (12,208 ft) above sea level (ASL), is the highest point of the Sierra Madre Oriental and the state of Nuevo León

The Highest Major Mountain Peaks of Sierra Madre Oriental
Rank	Mountain Peak	State	Mountain Range	Elevation	Prominence	Isolation
1	Cerro el Potosí PB	Nuevo León	Sierra Madre Oriental	3,721 m 12,208 feet	1,876 m 6,155 feet	570 km 354 miles
2	Cerro San Rafael PB	Coahuila	Sierra Madre Oriental	3,712 m 12,178 feet	1,395 m 4,577 feet	628 km 390 miles
3	Sierra de la Marta PB	Coahuila; Nuevo León	Sierra Madre Oriental	3,700 m 12,139 feet	1,010 m 3,314 feet	607 km 377 miles

== Ecology ==
This long range of tall mountains is noted for its abundant biodiversity and large number of endemic species of plants and wildlife, from the dry north to the wetter south. The Sierra Madre Oriental pine-oak forests are found at high elevations in the range (1,000–3,500 m or 3,300–11,500 ft above sea level). To the east, the Tamaulipan matorral occupies the range's lower slopes in Nuevo León and northern Tamaulipas, while the Veracruz moist forests cover the lower slopes of the central range, and the eastern slopes at the southern end of the range are home to the Veracruz montane forests. West of the range, the Mexican Plateau is home to deserts and xeric shrublands, including the Chihuahuan Desert to the north, the Meseta Central matorral on the central part of the plateau, and the Central Mexican matorral on the southern plateau.

Much of the wildlife can also be found in the Sierra Madre Occidental, which runs parallel to these mountains along western Mexico.

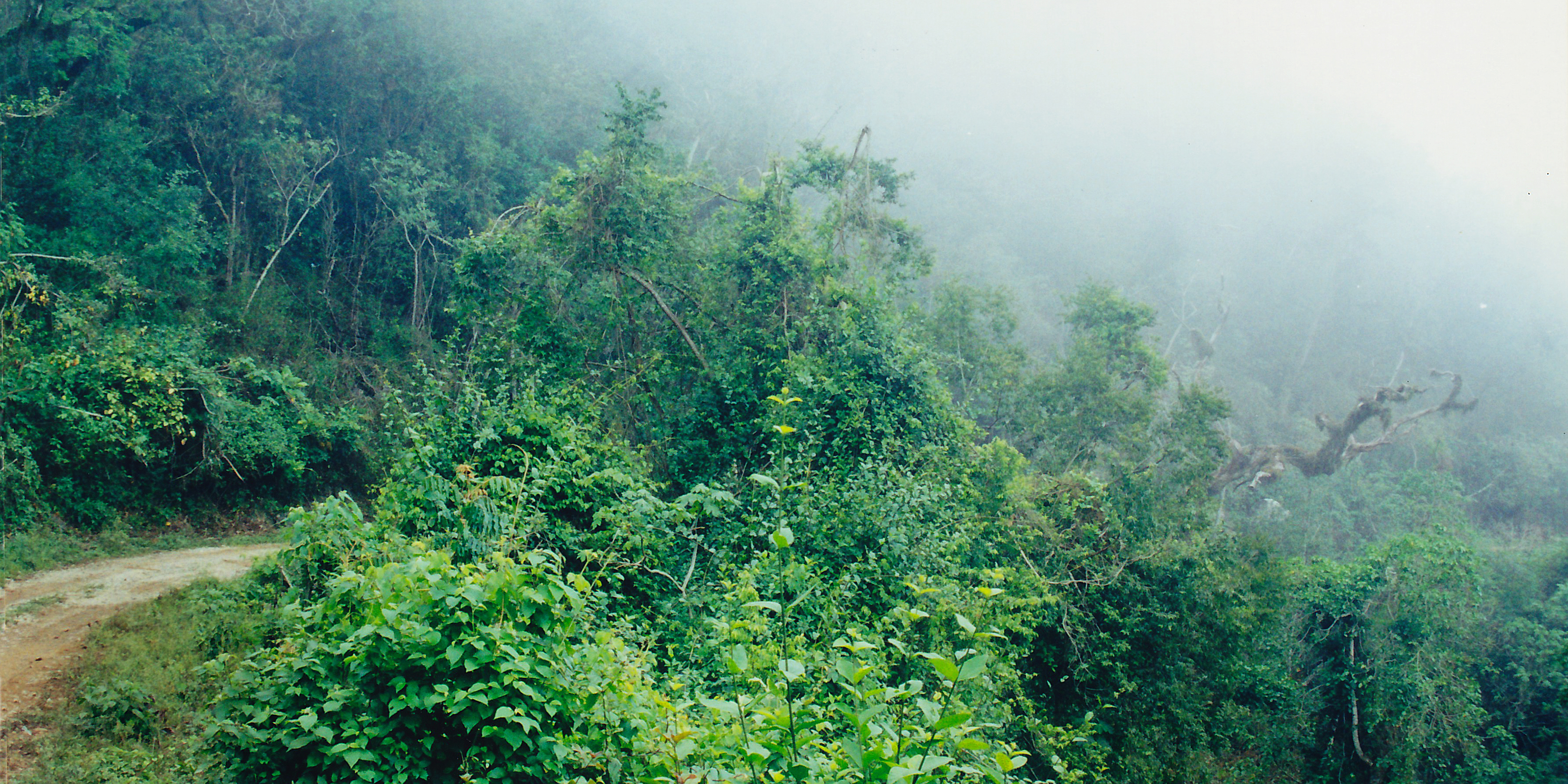
Road into the cloud forest of El Cielo Biosphere Reserve, Municipality of Gómez Farías, Tamaulipas, Mexico (16 April 2001)

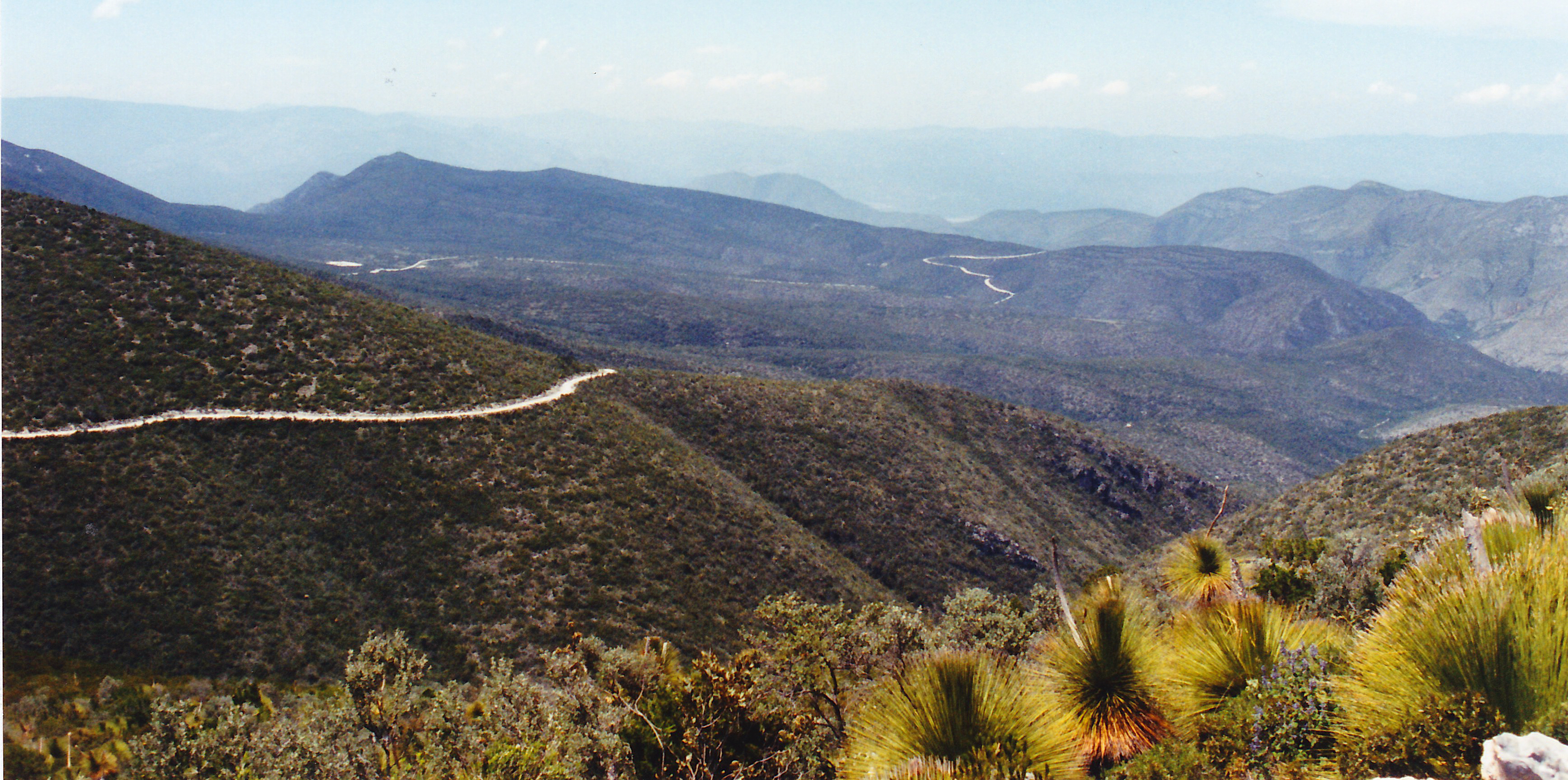
Gravel road through the arid interior slopes of the Sierra Madre Oriental, Municipality of Miquihuana, Tamaulipas, Mexico (10 August 2003)

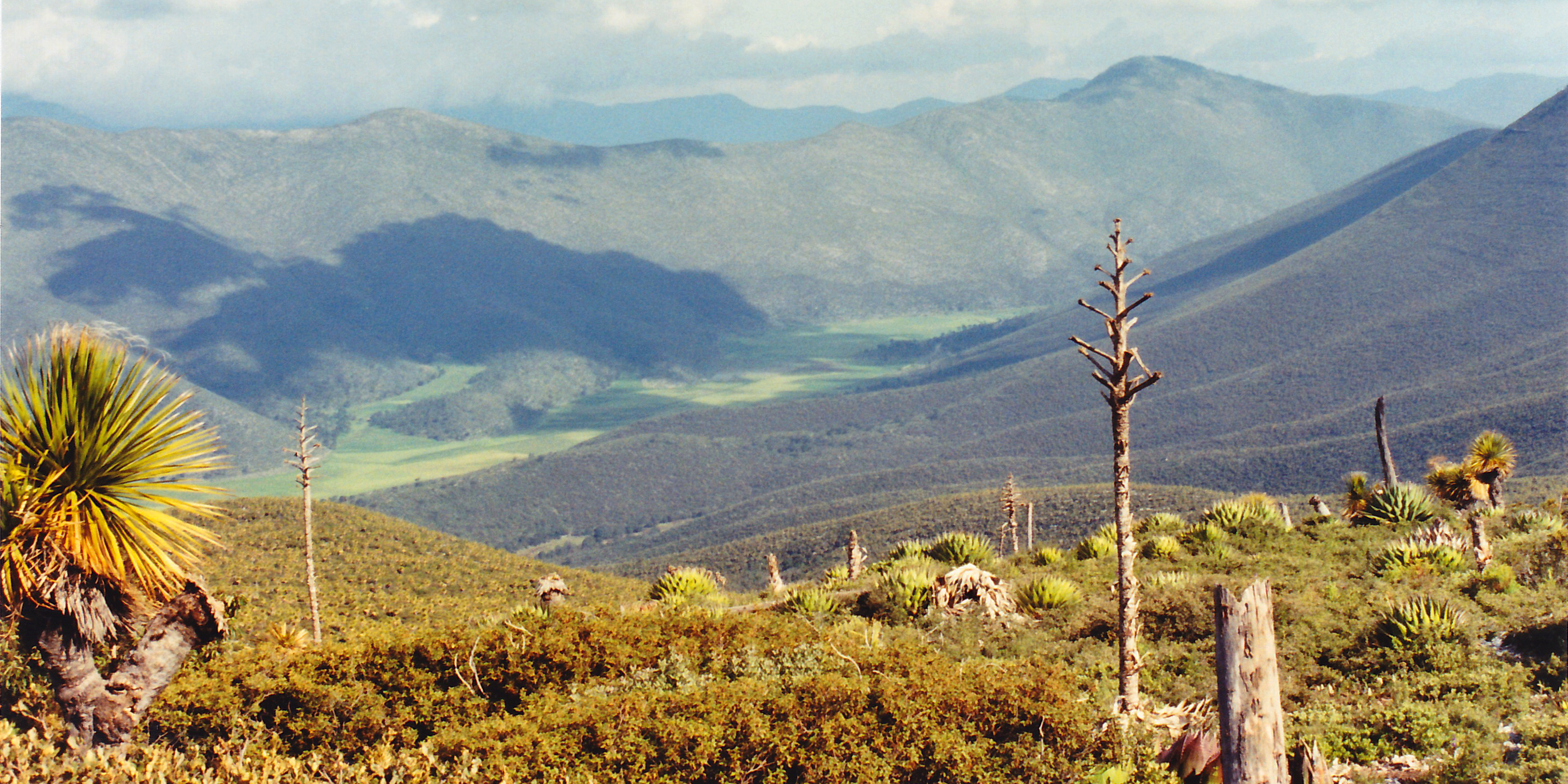
Looking down on the Marcela valley from Sierra Peña Navada, Municipality of Miquihuana, Tamaulipas, Mexico (10 August 2003)

=== Flora ===
Pine-oak forests are dominated by several species of pine, such as Pinus nelsonii, P. cembroides, P. pseudostrobus, and P. arizonica, and oak, such as Quercus castanea and Q. affinis. Matorral is characterized by woody shrubs, small trees, cacti, and succulents. Montane chaparral is found above 1,700 m (5,600 ft) and is home to species in the genera Quercus, Arbutus, Yucca, Cercocarpus and Bauhinia. Piedmont scrub occurs below 2,000 m (6,600 ft) and is composed of plants 3 to 5 m (9.8 to 16.4 ft) in height such as Helietta parvifolia, Neopringlea integrifolia and Acacia spp. The canopy of moist forests is dominated by trees up to 30 m (98 ft) in height, including Brosimum alicastrum, Manilkara zapota, Celtis monoica, Bursera simaruba, Dendropanax arboreus, and Sideroxylon capiri.

=== Fauna ===
Birds of the forest include the Mexican chickadee, Montezuma quail, Strickland's woodpecker, zone-tailed hawk and several species of jay.

Pine-oak forests in Coahuila are part of the migration route of monarch butterflies (Danaus plexippus).

=== Threats and conservation ===
Original habitats have been severely reduced by clearance for livestock grazing and logging over hundreds of years. Protected areas include the Cumbres de Monterrey National Park in Mexico and the Big Bend National Park in Texas. The El Cielo Biosphere in Tamaulipas preserves the northernmost tropical Veracruz moist forests in Mexico and extensive temperate cloud forests.

== See also ==
- Mountain peaks of Mexico
- Sierra Madre Occidental
