= List of the major 100-kilometer summits of North America =

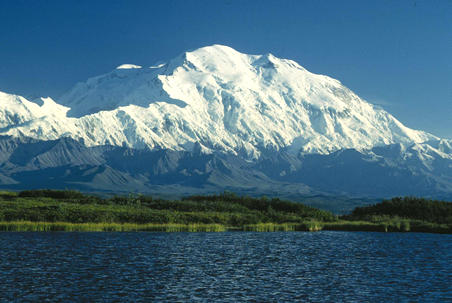
Denali in Alaska is the highest mountain peak of North America. Denali is the third most topographically prominent and third most topographically isolated summit on Earth after Mount Everest and Aconcagua.

The following sortable table comprises the 230 mountain peaks of greater North America with at least 100 kilometers (62.14 miles) of topographic isolation and at least 500 meters (1640 feet) of topographic prominence.

The summit of a mountain or hill may be measured in three principal ways:

1. The topographic elevation of a summit measures the height of the summit above a geodetic sea level.
2. The topographic prominence of a summit is a measure of how high the summit rises above its surroundings.
3. The topographic isolation (or radius of dominance) of a summit measures how far the summit lies from its nearest point of equal elevation.

Denali is one of only three summits on Earth with more than 6000 kilometers (3728 miles) of topographic isolation. Four major summits of greater North America exceed 2000 kilometers (1243 miles), eight exceed 1000 kilometers (621.4 miles), 35 exceed 500 kilometers (310.7 miles), 107 exceed 200 kilometers (124.3 miles), the following 230 major summits exceed 100 kilometers (62.14 miles), and 413 exceed 50 kilometers (31.07 miles) of topographic isolation.

== Major 100-kilometer summits ==
Of these 230 major 100-kilometer summits of North America, 103 are located in the United States (excluding four in Hawaiʻi), 50 in Canada, 33 in México, 21 in Greenland, four in Honduras, three in Cuba, two in Guatemala, two in Haiti, two in Panamá, and one each in the Dominican Republic, Costa Rica, Guadeloupe, Puerto Rico, Jamaica, Saint Kitts and Nevis, Saint Vincent and the Grenadines, Trinidad and Tobago, Nicaragua, Belize, Grenada, and the British Virgin Islands. Two of these peaks lie on the Canada-United States border and one lies on the Nicaragua-Honduras border.

The 230 summits of greater North America with at least 100 kilometers of topographic isolation and at least 500 meters of topographic prominence
Rank	Mountain Peak	Region	Mountain Range	Elevation	Prominence	Isolation	Location
1	Denali (Note: The summit of Denali is the highest point of the Alaska Range, the State of Alaska, the United States of America, and greater North America. Denali is the third most topographically prominent and third most topographically isolated summit on Earth after Mount Everest and Aconcagua.)	Alaska	Alaska Range	6190.5 m 20,310 ft	6141 m 20,146 ft	7,450.24	63.0690°N 151.0063°W
2	Gunnbjørn Fjeld (Note: The summit of Gunnbjørn Fjeld is the highest point of the Island of Greenland, Kalaallit Nunaat, the Kingdom of Denmark, and the entire Arctic.) (Note: Gunnbjørn Fjeld is the easternmost summit of its elevation in greater North America.)	Greenland	Island of Greenland	3694 m 12,119 ft	3694 m 12,119 ft	3,254.13	68.9184°N 29.8991°W
3	Pico de Orizaba (Note: The summit of Pico de Orizaba is the highest point of Estado Libre y Soberano de Puebla, Estado Libre y Soberano de Veracruz de Ignacio de la Llave, and all of México.) (Citlaltépetl)	Puebla; Veracruz	Cordillera Neovolcanica	5636 m 18,491 ft	4922 m 16,148 ft	2,690.14	19.0305°N 97.2698°W
4	Mount Whitney (Note: The summit of Mount Whitney is the highest point of the Sierra Nevada, the State of California, and the contiguous United States.) (Note: Mount Whitney is the southernmost and easternmost summit of its elevation in United States.)	California	Sierra Nevada	4421 m 14,505 ft	3072 m 10,080 ft	2,649.47	36.5786°N 118.2920°W
5	Mount Mitchell (Note: The summit of Mount Mitchell is the highest point of the Appalachian Mountains, the State of North Carolina, and the eastern United States.) (Note: Mount Mitchell is the easternmost 2000-meter (6562-foot) summit of the United States.) (Note: The elevation of Mount Mitchell includes an adjustment of +0.025 m (0.08 ft) from NGVD 29 to NAVD 88.)	North Carolina	Blue Ridge Mountains	2037 m 6,684 ft	1857 m 6,092 ft	1,913.49	35.7649°N 82.2651°W
6	Mount Washington (Note: The summit of Mount Washington is the highest point of the White Mountains, the State of New Hampshire, and the northeastern United States.) (Note: Mount Washington is the easternmost ultra-prominent summit of the United States.) (Note: The elevation of Mount Washington includes an adjustment of +0.02 m (0.07 ft) from NGVD 29 to NAVD 88.)	New Hampshire	White Mountains	1917 m 6,288 ft	1877 m 6,158 ft	1,318.95	44.2705°N 71.3032°W
7	Mount Rainier (Note: The summit of Mount Rainier is the highest point of the Cascade Range and the U.S. State of Washington. Mount Rainier is the most prominent summit in the contiguous United States and the fourth most prominent in North America.) (Note: The elevation of Mount Rainier includes an adjustment of +1.914 m (6.28 ft) from NGVD 29 to NAVD 88.)	Washington	Cascade Range	4394 m 14,417 ft	4026 m 13,210 ft	1,176.72	46.8529°N 121.7604°W
8	Mount Elbert (Note: The summit of Mount Elbert is the highest point of the U.S. State of Colorado, the Rocky Mountains of North America, and the entire Mississippi River drainage basin.)	Colorado	Sawatch Range	4401.2 m 14,440 ft	2772 m 9,093 ft	1,079.15	39.1178°N 106.4454°W
9	Pico Duarte (Note: The summit of Pico Duarte is the highest point of the Dominican Republic, the Island of Hispaniola, and all islands of the Caribbean Sea.)	Dominican Republic	Cordillera Central, Hispaniola	3098 m 10,164 ft	3098 m 10,164 ft	941 km 584 mi	19.0231°N 70.9977°W
10	Chirripó Grande (Note: The summit of Chirripó Grande is the highest point of the Republic of Costa Rica.) (Note: Chirripó Grande is the southernmost and easternmost summit of its elevation in Central America and greater North America.) (Cerro Chirripó)	Costa Rica	Cordillera de Talamanca	3819 m 12,530 ft	3755 m 12,320 ft	878 km 546 mi	9.4843°N 83.4889°W
11	Shishaldin Volcano (Note: The summit of Shishaldin Volcano is the highest point of Unimak Island and the Aleutian Islands.) (Note: Shishaldin Volcano is the westernmost summit of its elevation in Alaska, the United States, and greater North America.)	Alaska	Unimak Island	2869 m 9,414 ft	2869 m 9,414 ft	877 km 545 mi	54.7554°N 163.9709°W
12	Barbeau Peak (Note: The summit of Barbeau Peak is the highest point of Ellesmere Island and Nunavut of Canada.) (Note: Barbeau Peak is the northernmost ultra-prominent summit of Canada and greater North America.)	Nunavut	Ellesmere Island	2616 m 8,583 ft	2616 m 8,583 ft	796 km 495 mi	81.9148°N 75.0093°W
13	Mount Caubvick (Note: The summit of Mount Caubvick is the highest point of the Torngat Mountains, the Province of Newfoundland and Labrador, and all of eastern Canada.) (Mont d'Iberville)	Newfoundland and Labrador	Torngat Mountains	1652 m 5,420 ft	1367 m 4,485 ft	791 km 492 mi	58.8878°N 63.7098°W
14	Volcán Tajumulco (Note: The summit of Volcán Tajumulco is the highest point of the Sierra de las Nubes, the Republic of Guatemala, and all of Central America.) (Note: Volcán Tajumulco is the southernmost and easternmost 4000-meter (13,123-foot) summit of greater North America.)	Guatemala	Sierra de las Nubes	4220 m 13,845 ft	3990 m 13,091 ft	722 km 448 mi	15.0430°N 91.9037°W
15	Melville Island High Point	Nunavut	Melville Island	762 m 2,500 ft	762 m 2,500 ft	717 km 445 mi	75.3694°N 115.0827°W
16	La Grande Soufrière (Note: The summit of La Grande Soufrière is the highest point of île de Basse-Terre and the French Région Guadeloupe.) (Note: La Grande Soufrière is the southernmost and easternmost summit of its elevation in the Caribbean.)	Guadeloupe	île de Basse-Terre	1467 m 4,813 ft	1467 m 4,813 ft	699 km 434 mi	16.0449°N 61.6638°W
17	Tanaga Volcano (Note: The summit of Tanaga Volcano is the highest point of Tanaga Island and the Andreanof Islands.) (Note: Tanaga Volcano is the westernmost summit of its elevation in Alaska, the United States, and greater North America.)	Alaska	Tanaga Island	1806 m 5,925 ft	1806 m 5,925 ft	656 km 407 mi	51.8838°N 178.1429°W
18	Avannaarsua High Point (Note: The apex of Avannaarsua is the northernmost and westernmost summit of its elevation in Greenland.)	Greenland	Island of Greenland	2600 m 8,530 ft	500 m 1,640 ft	636 km 395 mi	77.5000°N 47.6167°W
19	Mount Isto (Note: The summit of Mount Isto is the highest point of the Brooks Range.) (Note: Mount Isto is the northernmost ultra-prominent summit of Alaska and the United States.)	Alaska	Brooks Range	2736 m 8,976 ft	2408 m 7,901 ft	634 km 394 mi	69.2025°N 143.8020°W
20	Mathiassen Mountain (Note: The summit of Mathiassen Mountain is the highest point of Southampton Island.)	Nunavut	Southampton Island	625 m 2,051 ft	625 m 2,051 ft	627 km 390 mi	64.7403°N 83.1573°W
21	Mount Logan (Note: The summit of Mount Logan is the highest point of the Saint Elias Mountains, Yukon, and all of Canada.)	Yukon	Saint Elias Mountains	5956 m 19,541 ft	5247 m 17,215 ft	623 km 387 mi	60.5671°N 140.4055°W
22	Angilaaq Mountain (Note: The summit of Angilaaq Mountain is the highest point of Bylot Island.)	Nunavut	Bylot Island	1944 m 6,378 ft	1944 m 6,378 ft	622 km 387 mi	73.2298°N 78.6230°W
23	Signal Hill (Note: The summit of Signal Hill is the highest point of the Ouachita Mountains and the U.S. State of Arkansas.) (Note: The elevation of Signal Hill includes an adjustment of +0.075 m (0.25 ft) from NGVD 29 to NAVD 88.) (Mount Magazine)	Arkansas	Ouachita Mountains	839 m 2,753 ft	653 m 2,143 ft	613 km 381 mi	35.1671°N 93.6447°W
24	Mount Odin (Note: The summit of Mount Odin is the highest point of Baffin Island.) (Note: Mount Odin is the easternmost summit of its elevation in Canada.)	Nunavut	Baffin Island	2143 m 7,031 ft	2143 m 7,031 ft	586 km 364 mi	66.5468°N 65.4289°W
25	Cerro El Potosí (Note: The summit of Cerro El Potosí is the highest point of Estado Libre y Soberano de Nuevo León.)	Nuevo León	Sierra Madre Oriental	3720 m 12,205 ft	1875 m 6,152 ft	571 km 355 mi	24.8719°N 100.2327°W
26	Mount Waddington (Note: The summit of Mount Waddington is the highest point of the Coast Mountains.) (Note: Mount Waddington is the southernmost and easternmost 4000-meter (13,123-foot) summit of Canada.)	British Columbia	Coast Mountains	4019 m 13,186 ft	3289 m 10,791 ft	562 km 349 mi	51.3737°N 125.2636°W
27	Melville Hills High Point	Northwest Territories	Melville Hills	876 m 2,875 ft	500 m 1,640 ft	551 km 342 mi	69.2425°N 121.5391°W
28	Keele Peak (Note: The summit of Keele Peak is the highest point of the Mackenzie Mountains.) (Note: Keele Peak is the northernmost summit of its elevation in Canada.)	Yukon	Mackenzie Mountains	2952 m 9,685 ft	2161 m 7,090 ft	543 km 337 mi	63.4314°N 130.3243°W
29	Mount Shasta (Note: The summit of Mount Shasta is the highest point of the southern Cascade Range.)	California	Cascade Range	4321.8 m 14,179 ft	2979 m 9,772 ft	539 km 335 mi	41.4092°N 122.1949°W
30	Perserajoq	Greenland	Island of Greenland	2259 m 7,411 ft	2009 m 6,591 ft	527 km 328 mi	71.4000°N 51.9667°W
31	Mealy Mountains High Point (Note: Mealy Mountains High Point is the easternmost 1000-meter (3281-foot) summit of Canada.)	Newfoundland and Labrador	Mealy Mountains	1190 m 3,904 ft	832 m 2,728 ft	519 km 323 mi	53.6465°N 58.5536°W
32	Peary Land High Point (Note: The apex of Peary Land is the northernmost summit of its elevation of Greenland and greater North America.)	Greenland	Island of Greenland	1910 m 6,266 ft	500 m 1,640 ft	509 km 317 mi	83.3167°N 35.3333°W
33	The Cabox (Note: The summit of The Cabox is the highest point of the island of Newfoundland.) (Note: The Cabox is the easternmost summit of its elevation in Canada.)	Newfoundland and Labrador	Island of Newfoundland	812 m 2,664 ft	812 m 2,664 ft	501 km 311 mi	48.8331°N 58.4843°W
34	Volcán Everman (Note: The summit of Volcán Everman is the highest point of Isla Socorro.)	Colima	Isla Socorro	1050 m 3,445 ft	1050 m 3,445 ft	500 km 311 mi	18.8000°N 110.9833°W
35	Greenland Ice Sheet High Point (Note: The apex of the Greenland Ice Sheet is the northernmost 3000-meter (9843-foot) summit of Greenland and greater North America.)	Greenland	Island of Greenland	3238 m 10,623 ft	500 m 1,640 ft	476 km 296 mi	72.4667°N 37.1000°W
36	Gannett Peak (Note: The summit of Gannett Peak is the highest point of the Wind River Range, the U.S. State of Wyoming, and the central Rocky Mountains.) (Note: Gannett Peak is the northernmost and westernmost summit of its elevation in the Rocky Mountains.)	Wyoming	Wind River Range	4209.1 m 13,809 ft	2157 m 7,076 ft	467 km 290 mi	43.1842°N 109.6542°W
37	Mont Yapeitso (Note: The summit of Mont Yapeitso is the highest point of the Monts Otish.)	Quebec	Monts Otish	1135 m 3,725 ft	500 m 1,640 ft	467 km 290 mi	52.3223°N 70.4451°W
38	Mount Robson (Note: The summit of Mount Robson is the highest point of the Canadian Rockies.) (Note: Mount Robson is the easternmost summit of its elevation in Canada and the northernmost and westernmost summit of its elevation in the Rocky Mountains.)	British Columbia	Canadian Rockies	3959 m 12,989 ft	2829 m 9,281 ft	460 km 286 mi	53.1105°N 119.1566°W
39	Mount Osborn (Note: The summit of Mount Osborn is the highest point of the Seward Peninsula.)	Alaska	Seward Peninsula	1437 m 4,714 ft	1334 m 4,377 ft	453 km 282 mi	64.9922°N 165.3294°W
40	Mount Igikpak (Note: The summit of Mount Igikpak is the highest point of the Schwatka Mountains.)	Alaska	Brooks Range	2523 m 8,276 ft	1867 m 6,126 ft	453 km 282 mi	67.4129°N 154.9656°W
41	Ulysses Mountain (Note: The summit of Ulysses Mountain is the highest point of the Far Northern Rockies.) (Note: Ulysses Mountain is the northernmost 3000-metre (9843-foot) summit of the Rocky Mountains.) (Mount Ulysses)	British Columbia	Muskwa Ranges	3024 m 9,921 ft	2294 m 7,526 ft	436 km 271 mi	57.3464°N 124.0928°W
42	Cerro de Punta (Note: The summit of Cerro de Punta is the highest point of the island and Commonwealth of Puerto Rico.)	Puerto Rico	Cordillera Central, Island of Puerto Rico	1338 m 4,389 ft	1338 m 4,389 ft	432 km 268 mi	18.1722°N 66.5917°W
43	Cerro Gordo (Note: The summit of Cerro Gordo is the highest point of the Sierra Madre Occidental and Estado Libre y Soberano de Durango.) (Note: Cerro Gordo is the westernmost summit of its elevation in México.)	Durango	Sierra Madre Occidental	3357 m 11,014 ft	1387 m 4,551 ft	424 km 263 mi	23.2060°N 104.9442°W
44	Pico San Juan (Note: Pico San Juan is the northernmost and westernmost 1000-meter (3281-foot) summit of the Caribbean.)	Cuba	Sierra Maestra, Island of Cuba	1140 m 3,740 ft	500 m 1,640 ft	408 km 253 mi	21.9853°N 80.1327°W
45	Mont Jacques-Cartier (Note: The summit of Mont Jacques-Cartier is the highest point of the Canadian Appalachians.) (Note: Mont Jacques-Cartier is the southernmost summit of its elevation in Canada.)	Quebec	Chic-Choc Mountains	1268 m 4,160 ft	1093 m 3,585 ft	406 km 252 mi	48.9879°N 65.9483°W
46	Nevado de Colima (Note: The summit of Nevado de Colima is the highest point of Estado Libre y Soberano de Jalisco.) (Note: Nevado de Colima is the northernmost and westernmost 4000-meter (13,123-foot) summit of México.)	Jalisco	Cordillera Neovolcanica	4270 m 14,009 ft	2720 m 8,924 ft	405 km 252 mi	19.5633°N 103.6087°W
47	Sukkertoppen (Note: Sukkertoppen is the westernmost summit of its elevation in Greenland.)	Greenland	Island of Greenland	2440 m 8,005 ft	500 m 1,640 ft	401 km 249 mi	66.2000°N 52.3500°W
48	Humphreys Peak (Note: The summit of Humphreys Peak is the highest point of the San Francisco Peaks and the U.S. State of Arizona.) (Note: The elevation of Humphreys Peak includes an adjustment of +1.345 m (4.41 ft) from NGVD 29 to NAVD 88.)	Arizona	San Francisco Peaks	3852 m 12,637 ft	1841 m 6,039 ft	396 km 246 mi	35.3464°N 111.6780°W
49	Haffner Bjerg (Note: Haffner Bjerg is the westernmost 1000-meter (3281-foot) summit in Greenland.)	Greenland	Island of Greenland	1050 m 3,445 ft	500 m 1,640 ft	393 km 244 mi	76.3426°N 62.3453°W
50	Victoria Island High Point	Nunavut	Victoria Island	655 m 2,149 ft	655 m 2,149 ft	375 km 233 mi	71.8528°N 112.6073°W
51	Wheeler Peak (Note: The summit of Wheeler Peak is the highest point of the Snake Range.)	Nevada	Snake Range	3982.3 m 13,065 ft	2307 m 7,568 ft	373 km 232 mi	38.9858°N 114.3139°W
52	Reval Toppen	Greenland	Island of Greenland	2320 m 7,612 ft	500 m 1,640 ft	368 km 229 mi	76.6606°N 25.7067°W
53	Kisimngiuqtuq Peak	Nunavut	Baffin Island	1905 m 6,250 ft	1605 m 5,266 ft	362 km 225 mi	70.7993°N 71.6502°W
54	Mount Vsevidof (Note: The summit of Mount Vsevidof is the highest point of Umnak Island.) (Note: Mount Vsevidof is the westernmost 2000-meter (6562-foot) summit of Alaska, the United States, and greater North America.)	Alaska	Umnak Island	2149 m 7,051 ft	2149 m 7,051 ft	358 km 223 mi	53.1256°N 168.6938°W
55	Mont Forel (Note: Mont Forel is the southernmost and westernmost summit of its elevation in Greenland.)	Greenland	Island of Greenland	3391 m 11,125 ft	1581 m 5,187 ft	357 km 222 mi	66.9354°N 36.7873°W
56	Beitstad Peak	Nunavut	Ellesmere Island	2347 m 7,700 ft	2044 m 6,706 ft	354 km 220 mi	78.8007°N 79.5292°W
57	Hahn Land High Point (Note: The apex of Hahn Land is the easternmost ultra-prominent summit of Greenland and greater North America.)	Greenland	Island of Greenland	1744 m 5,722 ft	1694 m 5,558 ft	347 km 216 mi	80.4333°N 19.8333°W
58	Pico La Laguna (Note: The summit of Pico La Laguna is the highest point of Sierra San Lazaro and Estado Libre y Soberano de Baja California Sur.)	Baja California Sur	Sierra La Laguna	2090 m 6,857 ft	1920 m 6,299 ft	343 km 213 mi	23.5392°N 109.9542°W
59	Volcán Las Tres Vírgenes	Baja California Sur	Tres Virgenes	1951 m 6,401 ft	1626 m 5,335 ft	340 km 211 mi	27.4700°N 112.5919°W
60	Isla Guadalupe High Point (Note: The summit of Isla Guadalupe is the westernmost 1000-meter (3281-foot) summit of México.)	Baja California	Isla Guadalupe	1310 m 4,298 ft	1310 m 4,298 ft	340 km 211 mi	29.1016°N 118.3132°W
61	Mount Veniaminof (Note: The summit of Mount Veniaminof is the highest point of the Alaska Peninsula.)	Alaska	Alaska Peninsula	2507 m 8,225 ft	2499 m 8,200 ft	337 km 209 mi	56.2194°N 159.2975°W
62	Picacho del Diablo (Note: The summit of Picacho del Diablo is the highest point of Sierra de San Pedro Mártir and the Baja California Peninsula.) (Note: Picacho del Diablo is the northernmost and westernmost 3000-meter (9843-foot) summit and ultra-prominent summit of México.)	Baja California	Sierra de San Pedro Mártir	3095 m 10,154 ft	2125 m 6,972 ft	335 km 208 mi	30.9925°N 115.3753°W
63	Cerro el Nacimiento (Note: The summit of Cerro el Nacimiento is the highest point of Sierra Madre del Sur and Estado Libre y Soberano de Oaxaca.)	Oaxaca	Sierra Madre del Sur	3710 m 12,172 ft	2140 m 7,021 ft	329 km 205 mi	16.2115°N 96.1967°W
64	Mount Ratz (Note: The summit of Mount Ratz is the highest point of the Boundary Ranges.)	British Columbia	Coast Mountains	3090 m 10,138 ft	2430 m 7,972 ft	311 km 193.4 mi	57.3930°N 132.3031°W
65	Hall Island High Point	Alaska	Hall Island	507 m 1,665 ft	507 m 1,665 ft	310 km 192.9 mi	60.6647°N 173.0887°W
66	Kuskokwim High Point (Note: The summit of Kuskokwim High Point is the highest point of the Kuskokwim Mountains.)	Alaska	Kuskokwim Mountains	1600 m 5,250 ft	1364 m 4,475 ft	308 km 191.6 mi	60.1159°N 159.3241°W
67	Patuersoq (Note: Patuersoq is the southernmost and westernmost summit of its elevation in Greenland.)	Greenland	Island of Greenland	2740 m 8,990 ft	500 m 1,640 ft	291 km 181.1 mi	60.8333°N 44.2333°W
68	Petermann Bjerg (Note: Petermann Bjerg is the northernmost and easternmost summit of its elevation of Greenland and greater North America.)	Greenland	Island of Greenland	2933 m 9,623 ft	1200 m 3,937 ft	288 km 179.1 mi	73.0905°N 28.6187°W
69	Spruce Knob (Note: The summit of Spruce Knob is the highest point of the Allegheny Mountains and the U.S. State of West Virginia.)	West Virginia	Allegheny Mountains	1482.1 m 4,863 ft	851 m 2,791 ft	282 km 175.4 mi	38.6999°N 79.5328°W
70	Blue Mountain Peak (Note: The summit of Blue Mountain Peak is the highest point of the island and the nation of Jamaica.) (Note: Blue Mountain Peak is the southernmost and westernmost 2000-meter (6562-foot) summit and ultra-prominent summit of the Caribbean.)	Jamaica	Island of Jamaica	2256 m 7,402 ft	2256 m 7,402 ft	273 km 169.5 mi	18.0465°N 76.5788°W
71	Kings Peak (Note: The summit of Kings Peak is the highest point of the Uinta Mountains, the U.S. State of Utah, and the western Rocky Mountains.) (Note: The elevation of Kings Peak includes an adjustment of +1.807 m (5.93 ft) from NGVD 29 to NAVD 88.)	Utah	Uinta Mountains	4125 m 13,534 ft	1938 m 6,358 ft	268 km 166.6 mi	40.7763°N 110.3729°W
72	Outlook Peak (Note: The summit of Outlook Peak is the highest point of Axel Heiberg Island.)	Nunavut	Axel Heiberg Island	2210 m 7,251 ft	2210 m 7,251 ft	268 km 166.3 mi	79.7397°N 91.4061°W
73	Sierra Blanca Peak (Note: The summit of Sierra Blanca Peak is the highest point of the Sacramento Mountains.)	New Mexico	Sacramento Mountains	3651.8 m 11,981 ft	1693 m 5,553 ft	267 km 165.7 mi	33.3743°N 105.8087°W
74	Devon Ice Cap High Point (Note: The summit of Devon Ice Cap High Point is the highest point of Devon Island.)	Nunavut	Devon Island	1920 m 6,300 ft	1920 m 6,300 ft	265 km 164.6 mi	75.3429°N 82.6186°W
75	Point 1740	Greenland	Island of Greenland	1740 m 5,709 ft	500 m 1,640 ft	263 km 163.4 mi	63.6667°N 50.2167°W
76	San Gorgonio Mountain (Note: The summit of San Gorgonio Mountain is the highest point of the San Bernardino Mountains.) (Note: The elevation of San Gorgonio Mountain includes an adjustment of +1.303 m (4.27 ft) from NGVD 29 to NAVD 88.)	California	San Bernardino Mountains	3506 m 11,503 ft	2528 m 8,294 ft	262 km 162.5 mi	34.0992°N 116.8249°W
77	Manuel Peak (Note: The summit of Manuel Peak is the highest point of the Richardson Mountains.)	Yukon	Richardson Mountains	1722 m 5,650 ft	1292 m 4,239 ft	260 km 161.6 mi	67.9833°N 136.5833°W
78	Katahdin (Note: The summit of Katahdin is the highest point of the Longfellow Mountains and the U.S. State of Maine.) (Note: Katahdin is the easternmost 1000-meter (3281-foot) summit of the United States.)	Maine	Longfellow Mountains	1606.4 m 5,270 ft	1309 m 4,293 ft	255 km 158.3 mi	45.9044°N 68.9213°W
79	Peak 4030 (Note: The summit of Peak 4030 is the highest point of the Nulato Hills.)	Alaska	Nulato Hills	1228 m 4,030 ft	500 m 1,640 ft	255 km 158.2 mi	64.4535°N 159.4152°W
80	Howson Peak (Note: The summit of Howson Peak is the highest point of the Hazleton Mountains.)	British Columbia	Coast Mountains	2759 m 9,052 ft	1829 m 6,001 ft	254 km 158 mi	54.4185°N 127.7441°W
81	Mount Baldy (Note: The summit of Mount Baldy is the highest point of the White Mountains.)	Arizona	White Mountains	3477.4 m 11,409 ft	1441 m 4,728 ft	248 km 154 mi	33.9059°N 109.5626°W
82	Borah Peak (Note: The summit of Borah Peak is the highest point of the Lost River Range and the U.S. State of Idaho.)	Idaho	Lost River Range	3861.2 m 12,668 ft	1829 m 6,002 ft	243 km 150.8 mi	44.1374°N 113.7811°W
83	Sierra Fría (Note: The summit of Sierra Fría is the highest point of Estado Libre y Soberano de Aguascalientes.)	Aguascalientes	Sierra Madre Occidental	3030 m 9,941 ft	500 m 1,640 ft	234 km 145.6 mi	22.2739°N 102.6073°W
84	Cloud Peak (Note: The summit of Cloud Peak is the highest point of the Bighorn Mountains.) (Note: Cloud Peak is the northernmost 4000-meter (13,123-foot) summit of the Rocky Mountains.)	Wyoming	Bighorn Mountains	4013.3 m 13,167 ft	2157 m 7,077 ft	233 km 145 mi	44.3821°N 107.1739°W
85	Cerro Mohinora (Note: The summit of Cerro Mohinora is the highest point of Estado Libre y Soberano de Chihuahua.) (Note: Cerro Mohinora is the northernmost and westernmost summit of its elevation in México.)	Chihuahua	Sierra Madre Occidental	3308 m 10,853 ft	858 m 2,815 ft	231 km 143.5 mi	25.9560°N 107.0476°W
86	Fox Mountain (Note: The summit of Fox Mountain is the highest point of the Pelly Mountains.)	Yukon	Pelly Mountains	2404 m 7,887 ft	1444 m 4,738 ft	229 km 142.5 mi	61.9224°N 133.3677°W
87	Cap Mountain (Note: The summit of Cap Mountain is the highest point of the Franklin Mountains.)	Northwest Territories	Franklin Mountains	1577 m 5,175 ft	500 m 1,640 ft	228 km 141.5 mi	63.4063°N 123.2061°W
88	Sierra la Madera	Coahuila	Mexican Plateau	3030 m 9,941 ft	1905 m 6,250 ft	226 km 140.7 mi	27.0345°N 102.3922°W
89	Black Elk Peak (Note: The summit of Black Elk Peak is the highest point of the Black Hills and the U.S. State of South Dakota.)	South Dakota	Black Hills	2208 m 7,244 ft	894 m 2,932 ft	226 km 140.2 mi	43.8658°N 103.5324°W
90	Mount Frank Rae (Note: The summit of Mount Frank Rae is the highest point of the Ogilvie Mountains.)	Yukon	Ogilvie Mountains	2362 m 7,750 ft	1367 m 4,486 ft	224 km 139.4 mi	64.4706°N 138.5553°W
91	Mount Nirvana (Note: The summit of Mount Nirvana is the highest point of the Northwest Territories of Canada.)	Northwest Territories	Mackenzie Mountains	2773 m 9,098 ft	1663 m 5,456 ft	220 km 136.8 mi	61.8752°N 127.6807°W
92	Slide Mountain (Note: The summit of Slide Mountain is the highest point of the Catskill Mountains.)	New York	Catskill Mountains	1274 m 4,180 ft	1004 m 3,295 ft	220 km 136.4 mi	41.9992°N 74.3859°W
93	Durham Heights (Note: The summit of Durham Heights is the highest point of Banks Island.)	Nunavut	Banks Island	724 m 2,375 ft	724 m 2,375 ft	218 km 135.4 mi	71.1358°N 122.9531°W
94	Mount Griggs	Alaska	Alaska Peninsula	2332 m 7,650 ft	2225 m 7,300 ft	218 km 135.4 mi	58.3534°N 155.0958°W
95	Charleston Peak (Note: The summit of Charleston Peak is the highest point of the Spring Mountains.) (Mount Charleston)	Nevada	Spring Mountains	3632 m 11,916 ft	2517 m 8,258 ft	218 km 135.1 mi	36.2716°N 115.6956°W
96	Pico Turquino (Note: The summit of Pico Turquino is the highest point of the island and Republic of Cuba.) (Note: Pico Turquino is the northernmost and westernmost ultra-prominent summit of the Caribbean.)	Cuba	Sierra Maestra, Island of Cuba	1974 m 6,476 ft	1974 m 6,476 ft	217 km 134.7 mi	19.9898°N 76.8360°W
97	Pic Macaya (Note: Pic Macaya is the westernmost summit of its elevation in the Caribbean.)	Haiti	Massif de la Hotte, Island of Hispaniola	2347 m 7,700 ft	2087 m 6,847 ft	216 km 134.5 mi	18.3822°N 74.0243°W
98	Junipero Serra Peak (Note: The summit of Junipero Serra Peak is the highest point of the Santa Lucia Range.) (Note: The elevation of Junipero Serra Peak includes an adjustment of +0.971 m (3.19 ft) from NGVD 29 to NAVD 88.)	California	Santa Lucia Range	1788 m 5,865 ft	1355 m 4,447 ft	212 km 131.8 mi	36.1457°N 121.4191°W
99	Mount Baker (Note: The summit of Mount Baker is the highest point of the northern Cascade Range.) (Note: The elevation of Mount Baker includes an adjustment of +1.43 m (4.69 ft) from NGVD 29 to NAVD 88.)	Washington	Skagit Range	3287 m 10,786 ft	2696 m 8,845 ft	212 km 131.5 mi	48.7768°N 121.8145°W
100	Mount Marcy (Note: The summit of Mount Marcy is the highest point of the Adirondack Mountains, the U.S. State of New York, and the drainage basins of the Gulf of Saint Lawrence and the Hudson River.)	New York	Adirondack Mountains	1628.57 m 5,343 ft	1499 m 4,919 ft	209 km 129.6 mi	44.1127°N 73.9237°W
101	Mont Raoul-Blanchard (Note: The summit of Mont Raoul-Blanchard is the highest point of the Laurentian Mountains.) (Note: Mont Raoul-Blanchard is the southernmost 1000-meter (3281-foot) summit of Canada.)	Quebec	Laurentian Mountains	1175 m 3,855 ft	790 m 2,592 ft	206 km 128.2 mi	47.3100°N 70.8312°W
102	Mount Marcus Baker (Note: The summit of Mount Marcus Baker is the highest point of the Chugach Mountains.)	Alaska	Chugach Mountains	4016 m 13,176 ft	3277 m 10,751 ft	203 km 126.3 mi	61.4374°N 147.7525°W
103	Mount Hayes (Note: The summit of Mount Hayes is the highest point of the Hayes Range.) (Note: Mount Hayes is the northernmost 4000-meter (13,123-foot) summit of Alaska, the United States, and greater North America.)	Alaska	Alaska Range	4216 m 13,832 ft	3507 m 11,507 ft	202 km 125.5 mi	63.6203°N 146.7178°W
104	Sacajawea Peak (Oregon) (Note: The summit of Sacajawea Peak (Oregon) is the highest point of the Wallowa Mountains and the Columbia Plateau.) (Note: The elevation of Sacajawea Peak (Oregon) includes an adjustment of +1.56 m (5.12 ft) from NGVD 29 to NAVD 88.)	Oregon	Wallowa Mountains	3000 m 9,843 ft	1949 m 6,393 ft	202 km 125.5 mi	45.2450°N 117.2929°W
105	Steens Mountain (Note: The elevation of Steens Mountain includes an adjustment of +1.496 m (4.91 ft) from NGVD 29 to NAVD 88.)	Oregon	Steens Mountain	2968 m 9,738 ft	1336 m 4,383 ft	201 km 124.7 mi	42.6364°N 118.5767°W
106	Mount Fairweather (Note: Mount Fairweather lies on the international border between Alaska and British Columbia. The peak is the highest point of the Canadian Province of British Columbia and the southernmost and easternmost summit of its elevation in both Canada and the United States.) (Fairweather Mountain)	Alaska; British Columbia	Saint Elias Mountains	4671 m 15,325 ft	3961 m 12,995 ft	200 km 124.4 mi	58.9064°N 137.5265°W
107	Mount Liamuiga (Note: The summit of Mount Liamuiga is the highest point of the island of Saint Kitts and the Federation of Saint Kitts and Nevis.) (Mount Misery)	Saint Kitts and Nevis	Saint Christopher Island (Island of Saint Kitts)	1156 m 3,793 ft	1156 m 3,793 ft	190.3 km 118.2 mi	17.3685°N 62.8029°W
108	Mount Macdonald (Note: The summit of Mount Macdonald is the highest point of the Bonnet Plume Mountains.) (Note: Mount Macdonald is the northernmost summit of its elevation in Canada.)	Yukon	Mackenzie Mountains	2760 m 9,055 ft	1555 m 5,102 ft	187.5 km 116.5 mi	64.7256°N 132.7781°W
109	Cerro El Centinela	Coahuila	Mexican Plateau	3122 m 10,243 ft	1657 m 5,436 ft	186.9 km 116.1 mi	25.1359°N 103.2304°W
110	Mont Veyrier (Note: The summit of Mont Veyrier is the highest point of the Monts Groulx.)	Quebec	Canadian Shield	1104 m 3,622 ft	500 m 1,640 ft	185.2 km 115.1 mi	51.5309°N 68.0763°W
111	Cerro Teotepec (Note: The summit of Cerro Teotepec is the highest point of Estado Libre y Soberano de Guerrero.)	Guerrero	Sierra Madre del Sur	3550 m 11,647 ft	2180 m 7,152 ft	185 km 114.9 mi	17.4682°N 100.1364°W
112	Mount Moresby (Note: The summit of Mount Moresby is the highest point of Moresby Island.)	British Columbia	Moresby Island	1164 m 3,819 ft	1164 m 3,819 ft	184.3 km 114.5 mi	53.0191°N 132.0856°W
113	Tooth Benchmark (Note: The summit of Tooth Benchmark is the highest point of Saint Lawrence Island and the islands of the Bering Sea.)	Alaska	Saint Lawrence Island	673 m 2,207 ft	673 m 2,207 ft	181.1 km 112.5 mi	63.5920°N 170.3804°W
114	Delano Peak (Note: The summit of Delano Peak is the highest point of the Tushar Mountains.)	Utah	Tushar Mountains	3710.7 m 12,174 ft	1435 m 4,709 ft	180.5 km 112.1 mi	38.3692°N 112.3714°W
115	Sierra de Santa Martha	Veracruz	Cordillera Neovolcanica	1690 m 5,545 ft	1620 m 5,315 ft	180.1 km 111.9 mi	18.3455°N 94.8576°W
116	Grey Hunter Peak	Yukon	North Yukon Plateau	2214 m 7,264 ft	1519 m 4,984 ft	178.7 km 111 mi	63.1357°N 135.6359°W
117	Cerro la Muralla	Oaxaca	Sierra Madre del Sur	3370 m 11,056 ft	1430 m 4,692 ft	175.7 km 109.2 mi	17.1344°N 97.6640°W
118	Cerro Tacarcuna (Note: Cerro Tacarcuna is the southernmost ultra-prominent summit of Central America and greater North America.)	Panama	Darién	1875 m 6,152 ft	1770 m 5,807 ft	174.4 km 108.3 mi	8.1659°N 77.2959°W
119	Mount Olympus (Note: The summit of Mount Olympus is the highest point of the Olympic Mountains.)	Washington	Olympic Mountains	2432.3 m 7,980 ft	2389 m 7,838 ft	173.7 km 108 mi	47.8013°N 123.7108°W
120	Isla Cedros High Point	Baja California	Isla Cedros	1200 m 3,937 ft	1200 m 3,937 ft	168.5 km 104.7 mi	28.1301°N 115.2206°W
121	Point 813 (Note: Point 813 is the westernmost 500-meter (1640-foot) summit in Greenland.)	Greenland	Island of Greenland	813 m 2,667 ft	500 m 1,640 ft	168 km 104.4 mi	76.4035°N 68.7271°W
122	Black Mountain (Note: The summit of Black Mountain is the highest point of the De Long Mountains.)	Alaska	Brooks Range	1530 m 5,020 ft	1020 m 3,346 ft	166.6 km 103.5 mi	68.5598°N 160.3281°W
123	Blanca Peak (Note: The summit of Blanca Peak is the highest point of the Sangre de Cristo Mountains and the entire Rio Grande drainage basin.) (Note: Blanca Peak is the southernmost ultra-prominent summit of the Rocky Mountains.) (Note: The elevation of Blanca Peak includes an adjustment of +1.755 m (5.76 ft) from NGVD 29 to NAVD 88.)	Colorado	Sangre de Cristo Mountains	4374 m 14,351 ft	1623 m 5,326 ft	166.4 km 103.4 mi	37.5775°N 105.4856°W
124	Stauning Alper (Note: Stauning Alper is the easternmost summit of its elevation of Greenland and greater North America.)	Greenland	Island of Greenland	2831 m 9,288 ft	2181 m 7,156 ft	164.9 km 102.5 mi	72.1167°N 24.9000°W
125	Cerro Tzontehuitz	Chiapas	Sierra Madre de Chiapas	2910 m 9,547 ft	1370 m 4,495 ft	164.5 km 102.2 mi	16.8358°N 92.5894°W
126	La Soufrière (Note: The summit of La Soufrière is the highest point of the island of Saint Vincent and the nation of Saint Vincent and the Grenadines.) (Note: La Soufrière is the southernmost 1000-meter (3281-foot) summit of the Caribbean.)	Saint Vincent and the Grenadines	Island of Saint Vincent	1234 m 4,049 ft	1234 m 4,049 ft	161.7 km 100.5 mi	13.3477°N 61.1761°W
127	Mount Tozi (Note: The summit of Mount Tozi is the highest point of the Ray Mountains.)	Alaska	Ray Mountains	1682 m 5,519 ft	1271 m 4,169 ft	160.1 km 99.5 mi	65.6865°N 150.9498°W
128	Mount Cleveland (Note: The summit of Mount Cleveland is the highest point of the Lewis Range.)	Montana	Lewis Range	3194 m 10,479 ft	1599 m 5,246 ft	159.9 km 99.4 mi	48.9249°N 113.8482°W
129	Mount Jefferson (Note: The summit of Mount Jefferson is the highest point of the Toquima Range.) (Note: The elevation of Mount Jefferson includes an adjustment of +1.666 m (5.47 ft) from NGVD 29 to NAVD 88.)	Nevada	Toquima Range	3641 m 11,946 ft	1789 m 5,871 ft	158.7 km 98.6 mi	38.7519°N 116.9267°W
130	Mount Columbia (Note: Mount Columbia on the Great Divide between British Columbia and Alberta is the highest point of the Columbia Icefield, the Province of Alberta, and the entire Beaufort Sea Drainage basin.)	Alberta; British Columbia	Canadian Rockies	3741 m 12,274 ft	2371 m 7,779 ft	158 km 98.2 mi	52.1473°N 117.4416°W
132	Mount Torbert (Note: The summit of Mount Torbert is the highest point of the Tordrillo Mountains.) (Note: Mount Torbert is the westernmost summit of its elevation in Alaska and greater North America.)	Alaska	Alaska Range	3479 m 11,413 ft	2648 m 8,688 ft	157.3 km 97.7 mi	61.4086°N 152.4125°W
133	Skihist Mountain (Note: The summit of Skihist Mountain is the highest point of the Lillooet Range.)	British Columbia	Coast Mountains	2968 m 9,738 ft	2458 m 8,064 ft	157.1 km 97.6 mi	50.1878°N 121.9032°W
134	Mount Chiginagak	Alaska	Aleutian Range	2111 m 6,925 ft	2035 m 6,675 ft	157 km 97.6 mi	57.1334°N 156.9912°W
135	Baldy Peak (Note: The summit of Baldy Peak is the highest point of the Davis Mountains.) (Note: Baldy Peak is the easternmost summit of its elevation in the United States.)	Texas	Davis Mountains	2554.5 m 8,381 ft	1196 m 3,923 ft	153.6 km 95.4 mi	30.6356°N 104.1737°W
136	Hualapai Peak (Note: The summit of Hualapai Peak is the highest point of the Hualapai Mountains.)	Arizona	Hualapai Mountains	2568.2 m 8,426 ft	1353 m 4,439 ft	153.2 km 95.2 mi	35.0751°N 113.8979°W
137	Ruby Dome (Note: The summit of Ruby Dome is the highest point of the Ruby Mountains.) (Note: The elevation of Ruby Dome includes an adjustment of +1.429 m (4.69 ft) from NGVD 29 to NAVD 88.)	Nevada	Ruby Mountains	3472 m 11,392 ft	1466 m 4,810 ft	152.5 km 94.7 mi	40.6217°N 115.4754°W
137	Cerro San José (Note: Cerro San José on the border of Chihuahua is the highest point of Estado Libre y Soberano de Sonora.)	Chihuahua; Sonora	Mexican Plateau	2710 m 8,891 ft	660 m 2,165 ft	152.5 km 94.7 mi	30.5483°N 108.6167°W
139	Mount Pavlof (Note: The summit of Mount Pavlof is the highest point of the Alaska Peninsula.)	Alaska	Alaska Peninsula	2515 m 8,250 ft	2499 m 8,200 ft	151.8 km 94.3 mi	55.4173°N 161.8932°W
140	Aripo Peak (Note: The summit of Aripo Peak is the highest point of the island of Trinidad and the Republic of Trinidad and Tobago.) (Note: Aripo Peak is the southernmost 500-meter (1640-foot) summit of the Caribbean.)	Trinidad and Tobago	Northern Range, Island of Trinidad	940 m 3,084 ft	940 m 3,084 ft	151.6 km 94.2 mi	10.7231°N 61.2499°W
141	White Hill (Note: The summit of White Hill is the highest point of Cape Breton Island and the Canadian Province of Nova Scotia.) (Note: White Hill is the southernmost 500-meter (1640-foot) summit of Canada.)	Nova Scotia	Cape Breton Highlands, Cape Breton Island	535 m 1,755 ft	535 m 1,755 ft	151.6 km 94.2 mi	46.7022°N 60.5989°W
142	Pico Bonito (Note: Pico Bonito is the northernmost 2000-meter (6562-foot) summit of Central America.)	Honduras	Cordillera Nombre de Dios	2450 m 8,038 ft	1710 m 5,610 ft	151 km 93.8 mi	15.5575°N 86.8756°W
143	Mount Crysdale	British Columbia	Misinchinka Ranges	2429 m 7,969 ft	1554 m 5,098 ft	147.3 km 91.5 mi	55.9383°N 123.4210°W
144	Qiajivik Mountain	Nunavut	Baffin Island	1905 m 6,250 ft	1729 m 5,673 ft	143.8 km 89.3 mi	72.1809°N 75.9090°W
145	Popocatépetl (Note: Popocatépetl on the border of Puebla is the highest point of both Estado Libre y Soberano de México and Estado Libre y Soberano de Morelos.) (Note: Popocatépetl is the southernmost 5000-meter (16,404-foot) summit of México and greater North America.)	México; Morelos; Puebla	Cordillera Neovolcanica	5410 m 17,749 ft	3040 m 9,974 ft	143 km 88.8 mi	19.0225°N 98.6278°W
146	Pico Mogotón (Note: Pico Mogotón on the international border with Honduras is the highest point of the Republic of Nicaragua.)	Nicaragua; Honduras	Sierra de las Nubes	2106 m 6,909 ft	1321 m 4,334 ft	142 km 88.2 mi	13.7631°N 86.3983°W
147	Mount Assiniboine (Note: Mount Assiniboine is the southernmost and easternmost summit of its elevation in Canada.)	Alberta; British Columbia	Canadian Rockies	3616 m 11,864 ft	2082 m 6,831 ft	141.8 km 88.1 mi	50.8696°N 115.6509°W
148	South Baldy (Note: The summit of South Baldy is the highest point of the Magdalena Mountains.)	New Mexico	Magdalena Mountains	3288 m 10,787 ft	1162 m 3,813 ft	141.7 km 88.1 mi	33.9910°N 107.1879°W
149	Truuli Peak (Note: The summit of Truuli Peak is the highest point of the Kenai Mountains.)	Alaska	Kenai Mountains	2015 m 6,612 ft	1848 m 6,062 ft	141.3 km 87.8 mi	59.9129°N 150.4348°W
150	Great Sitkin Volcano (Note: The summit of Great Sitkin Volcano is the highest point of Great Sitkin Island.)	Alaska	Great Sitkin Island	1740 m 5,710 ft	1740 m 5,710 ft	141.3 km 87.8 mi	52.0763°N 176.1108°W
151	Eagle Peak (Note: The summit of Eagle Peak is the highest point of the Warner Mountains.)	California	Warner Mountains	3016 m 9,895 ft	1330 m 4,362 ft	140.6 km 87.4 mi	41.2835°N 120.2007°W
152	Azimuthbjerg (Note: The summit of Azimuthbjerg is the highest point of the island of Skjoldungen.)	Greenland	Island of Skjoldungen	1738 m 5,702 ft	1738 m 5,702 ft	140.5 km 87.3 mi	63.4552°N 41.8508°W
153	Mount Taylor (Note: The summit of Mount Taylor is the highest point of the northern San Mateo Mountains.)	New Mexico	San Mateo Mountains	3445.9 m 11,305 ft	1248 m 4,094 ft	139.6 km 86.8 mi	35.2387°N 107.6085°W
154	Accomplishment Peak (Note: The summit of Accomplishment Peak is the highest point of the Philip Smith Mountains.)	Alaska	Brooks Range	2452 m 8,045 ft	1279 m 4,195 ft	139.2 km 86.5 mi	68.4433°N 148.0947°W
155	McBeth-Inugsuin Peak (Peak 39-18)	Nunavut	Baffin Island	1721 m 5,646 ft	1564 m 5,131 ft	138.5 km 86.1 mi	69.6524°N 69.3059°W
156	Granite Peak (Note: The summit of Granite Peak is the highest point of the Beartooth Mountains and the U.S. State of Montana.)	Montana	Beartooth Mountains	3903.5 m 12,807 ft	1457 m 4,779 ft	138.5 km 86 mi	45.1634°N 109.8075°W
157	Doyle's Delight (Note: The summit of Doyle's Delight is the highest point of Belize and the Yucatán Peninsula.) (Note: Doyle's Delight is the northernmost 1000-meter (3281-foot) summit of Central America.)	Belize	Yucatán Peninsula	1174 m 3,852 ft	500 m 1,640 ft	138.3 km 85.9 mi	16.4941°N 89.0456°W
158	Kiska Volcano (Note: The summit of Kiska Volcano is the highest point of Kiska Island.) (Note: Kiska Volcano is the westernmost 1000-meter (3281-foot) summit of Alaska, the United States, and greater North America.)	Alaska	Kiska Island	1220 m 4,004 ft	1220 m 4,004 ft	137.7 km 85.6 mi	52.1027°N 177.6030°E
159	Korovin Volcano (Note: The summit of Korovin Volcano is the highest point of Atka Island.)	Alaska	Atka Island	1533 m 5,030 ft	1533 m 5,030 ft	137.2 km 85.2 mi	52.3816°N 174.1653°W
160	Uncompahgre Peak (Note: The summit of Uncompahgre Peak is the highest point of the San Juan Mountains and the entire Gulf of California drainage basin.) (Note: Uncompahgre Peak is the westernmost summit of its elevation in the Rocky Mountains.)	Colorado	San Juan Mountains	4365 m 14,321 ft	1304 m 4,277 ft	136.8 km 85 mi	38.0717°N 107.4621°W
161	Simpson Peak	British Columbia	Stikine Plateau	2170 m 7,119 ft	985 m 3,232 ft	136.6 km 84.9 mi	59.7234°N 131.4480°W
162	Devils Paw (Note: The summit of Devils Paw is the highest point of the Juneau Icefield.)	Alaska; British Columbia	Coast Mountains	2593 m 8,507 ft	1703 m 5,587 ft	136.3 km 84.7 mi	58.7289°N 133.8402°W
163	Volcán Tancítaro (Note: The summit of Volcán Tancítaro is the highest point of Estado Libre y Soberano de Michoacán de Ocampo.)	Michoacán	Cordillera Neovolcanica	3840 m 12,598 ft	1665 m 5,463 ft	136.3 km 84.7 mi	19.4166°N 102.3198°W
164	Cerro Hoya (Note: Cerro Hoya is the southernmost 1000-meter (3281-foot) summit of Central America and greater North America.)	Panama	Azuero Peninsula	1559 m 5,115 ft	500 m 1,640 ft	135.7 km 84.3 mi	7.3179°N 80.6810°W
165	Gaaseland High Point	Greenland	Island of Greenland	2100 m 6,890 ft	1550 m 5,085 ft	135.6 km 84.3 mi	70.2000°N 27.6667°W
166	Koniag Peak (Note: The summit of Koniag Peak is the highest point of Kodiak Island.)	Alaska	Kodiak Island	1378 m 4,520 ft	1378 m 4,520 ft	135.5 km 84.2 mi	57.3548°N 153.3235°W
167	Mount Saint Catherine (Note: The summit of Mount Saint Catherine is the highest point of the island and nation of Grenada.) (Note: Mount Saint Catherine is the southernmost summit of its elevation in the Caribbean.)	Grenada	Mount St. Catherine Massif, Island of Grenada	840 m 2,756 ft	840 m 2,756 ft	135.2 km 84 mi	12.1623°N 61.6750°W
168	Mount Carleton (Note: The summit of Mount Carleton is the highest point of the Canadian Province of New Brunswick.)	New Brunswick	Notre Dame Mountains	820 m 2,690 ft	625 m 2,051 ft	134.7 km 83.7 mi	47.3780°N 66.8761°W
169	Volcán San Cristóbal	Nicaragua	Cordillera Los Maribios	1745 m 5,725 ft	1665 m 5,463 ft	134.5 km 83.6 mi	12.7026°N 87.0057°W
170	Golden Hinde (Note: The summit of Golden Hinde is the highest point of Vancouver Island.)	British Columbia	Vancouver Island Ranges, Vancouver Island	2197 m 7,208 ft	2197 m 7,208 ft	134.3 km 83.4 mi	49.6627°N 125.7470°W
171	Makushin Volcano (Note: The summit of Makushin Volcano is the highest point of Unalaska Island.)	Alaska	Unalaska Island	1800 m 5,905 ft	1800 m 5,905 ft	133.8 km 83.1 mi	53.8782°N 166.9299°W
172	Mount Pinos (Note: The summit of Mount Pinos is the highest point of the San Emigdio Mountains.)	California	San Emigdio Mountains	2696.5 m 8,847 ft	1463 m 4,800 ft	133.5 km 82.9 mi	34.8128°N 119.1454°W
173	Snowshoe Peak (Note: The summit of Snowshoe Peak is the highest point of the Cabinet Mountains.) (Note: The elevation of Snowshoe Peak includes an adjustment of +1.367 m (4.48 ft) from NGVD 29 to NAVD 88.)	Montana	Cabinet Mountains	2665 m 8,743 ft	1658 m 5,438 ft	133.5 km 82.9 mi	48.2231°N 115.6890°W
174	Cerro La Sandía	Baja California	Baja California Peninsula	1810 m 5,938 ft	1400 m 4,593 ft	133.2 km 82.7 mi	28.4073°N 113.4387°W
175	Mount Graham (Note: The summit of Mount Graham is the highest point of the Pinaleño Mountains.)	Arizona	Pinaleño Mountains	3268.6 m 10,724 ft	1932 m 6,340 ft	132.6 km 82.4 mi	32.7017°N 109.8714°W
176	Granite Peak (Note: The summit of Granite Peak is the highest point of the Santa Rosa Range.)	Nevada	Santa Rosa Range	2966.3 m 9,732 ft	1341 m 4,400 ft	132.6 km 82.4 mi	41.6681°N 117.5889°W
177	Cerro Las Minas (Note: The summit of Cerro Las Minas is the highest point of the Republic of Honduras.)	Honduras	Sierra de las Nubes	2849 m 9,347 ft	2069 m 6,788 ft	132 km 82 mi	14.5340°N 88.6804°W
178	Cache Peak (Note: The summit of Cache Peak is the highest point of the Albion Range.)	Idaho	Albion Range	3152.5 m 10,343 ft	1365 m 4,479 ft	131.6 km 81.8 mi	42.1856°N 113.6611°W
179	West Butte (Note: The summit of West Butte is the highest point of the Sweetgrass Hills.) (Note: The elevation of West Butte includes an adjustment of +1.061 m (3.48 ft) from NGVD 29 to NAVD 88.)	Montana	Sweetgrass Hills	2129 m 6,986 ft	1109 m 3,638 ft	130.2 km 80.9 mi	48.9316°N 111.5324°W
180	Cerro Tres Picos	Chiapas	Sierra Madre de Chiapas	2550 m 8,366 ft	500 m 1,640 ft	130 km 80.8 mi	16.1970°N 93.6112°W
181	Veniaminof Peak (Note: The summit of Veniaminof Peak is the highest point of Baranof Island.)	Alaska	Baranof Island	1643 m 5,390 ft	1643 m 5,390 ft	128.3 km 79.7 mi	57.0151°N 134.9882°W
182	McDonald Peak (Note: The summit of McDonald Peak is the highest point of the Mission Range.) (Note: The elevation of McDonald Peak includes an adjustment of +1.318 m (4.32 ft) from NGVD 29 to NAVD 88.)	Montana	Mission Range	2994 m 9,824 ft	1722 m 5,650 ft	127.8 km 79.4 mi	47.3826°N 113.9191°W
183	Pic la Selle (Note: The summit of Pic la Selle is the highest point of the Republic of Haiti.) (Note: Pic la Selle is the southernmost and westernmost summit of its elevation in the Caribbean.)	Haiti	Chaîne de la Selle, Island of Hispaniola	2674 m 8,773 ft	2644 m 8,675 ft	126.6 km 78.7 mi	18.3602°N 71.9767°W
184	Volcán Acatenango (Note: Volcán Acatenango is the southernmost and easternmost summit of its elevation in Central America and greater North America.)	Guatemala	Chimaltenango	3975 m 13,041 ft	1835 m 6,020 ft	125.9 km 78.2 mi	14.5016°N 90.8755°W
185	Picacho San Onofre (Sierra Peña Nevada)	Nuevo León	Sierra Madre Oriental	3550 m 11,647 ft	1650 m 5,413 ft	125 km 77.6 mi	23.8007°N 99.8464°W
186	Mount Jancowski	British Columbia	Coast Mountains	2729 m 8,953 ft	2079 m 6,821 ft	124 km 77.1 mi	56.3372°N 129.9817°W
187	Hilgard Peak (Note: The summit of Hilgard Peak is the highest point of the Madison Range.) (Note: The elevation of Hilgard Peak includes an adjustment of +1.49 m (4.89 ft) from NGVD 29 to NAVD 88.)	Montana	Madison Range	3451 m 11,321 ft	1238 m 4,063 ft	123 km 76.4 mi	44.9166°N 111.4593°W
188	Sierra de Agalta High Point	Honduras	Sierra de Agalta	2335 m 7,661 ft	1505 m 4,938 ft	122.6 km 76.1 mi	14.9576°N 85.9165°W
189	Point 574	Greenland	Island of Greenland	574 m 1,883 ft	500 m 1,640 ft	122.2 km 76 mi	82.0000°N 59.1667°W
190	Mount Nebo (Note: The summit of Mount Nebo is the highest point of the Wasatch Range.) (Note: The elevation of Mount Nebo includes an adjustment of +1.395 m (4.58 ft) from NGVD 29 to NAVD 88.)	Utah	Wasatch Range	3637 m 11,933 ft	1679 m 5,508 ft	121.6 km 75.6 mi	39.8219°N 111.7603°W
191	Tweedy Mountain (Note: The summit of Tweedy Mountain is the highest point of the Pioneer Mountains.) (Note: The elevation of Tweedy Mountain includes an adjustment of +1.598 m (5.24 ft) from NGVD 29 to NAVD 88.)	Montana	Pioneer Mountains	3401 m 11,159 ft	1163 m 3,814 ft	120.7 km 75 mi	45.4805°N 112.9655°W
192	Cerro Giganta (Note: The summit of Cerro Giganta is the highest point of 33005.)	Baja California Sur	Sierra de la Giganta	1690 m 5,545 ft	1400 m 4,593 ft	120.7 km 75 mi	26.1064°N 111.5844°W
193	Mount Sage (Note: The summit of Mount Sage is the highest point of the Island of Tortola and the British Virgin Islands.)	British Virgin Islands	Island of Tortola	521 m 1,709 ft	521 m 1,709 ft	120.1 km 74.6 mi	18.4095°N 64.6556°W
194	J.A.D. Jensen Nunatakker	Greenland	Island of Greenland	1668 m 5,472 ft	500 m 1,640 ft	119.5 km 74.2 mi	62.7920°N 48.8483°W
195	Blackburn Hills	Alaska	Nulato Hills	1004 m 3,295 ft	500 m 1,640 ft	118.9 km 73.9 mi	63.4107°N 159.6559°W
196	Buldir Volcano (Note: The summit of Buldir Volcano is the highest point of Buldir Island.) (Note: Buldir Volcano is the westernmost 500-meter (1640-foot) summit of Alaska, the United States, and greater North America.)	Alaska	Buldir Island	656 m 2,152 ft	656 m 2,152 ft	118.7 km 73.8 mi	52.3482°N 175.9105°E
197	Nevado de Toluca (Note: Nevado de Toluca is the westernmost summit of its elevation in México.) (Volcán Xinantécatl)	México	Cordillera Neovolcanica	4690 m 15,387 ft	2225 m 7,300 ft	118.4 km 73.6 mi	19.1020°N 99.7677°W
198	Shedin Peak (Note: The summit of Shedin Peak is the highest point of the Skeena Mountains.)	British Columbia	Skeena Mountains	2588 m 8,491 ft	1798 m 5,899 ft	118.2 km 73.4 mi	55.9392°N 127.4799°W
199	Mount Tom White	Alaska	Chugach Mountains	3411 m 11,191 ft	2329 m 7,641 ft	117.6 km 73 mi	60.6518°N 143.6972°W
200	Mount Peale (Note: The summit of Mount Peale is the highest point of the La Sal Mountains and the Colorado Plateau.)	Utah	La Sal Mountains	3879 m 12,726 ft	1884 m 6,181 ft	117.1 km 72.8 mi	38.4385°N 109.2292°W
201	Favres Bjerg (Note: Favres Bjerg is the easternmost 2000-meter (6562-foot) summit of Greenland and greater North America.)	Greenland	Island of Greenland	2000 m 6,562 ft	1546 m 5,072 ft	117.1 km 72.8 mi	73.9500°N 23.2000°W
202	Guadalupe Peak (Note: The summit of Guadalupe Peak is the highest point of the Guadalupe Mountains and the U.S. State of Texas.) (Note: The elevation of Guadalupe Peak includes an adjustment of +0.681 m (2.23 ft) from NGVD 29 to NAVD 88.)	Texas	Guadalupe Mountains	2667 m 8,751 ft	926 m 3,039 ft	116.9 km 72.6 mi	31.8916°N 104.8606°W
203	Cinnabar Mountain (Note: The summit of Cinnabar Mountain is the highest point of the Owyhee Mountains.)	Idaho	Owyhee Mountains	2563.2 m 8,409 ft	955 m 3,133 ft	115.1 km 71.5 mi	42.9805°N 116.6575°W
204	Lassen Peak	California	Cascade Range	3188.7 m 10,462 ft	1594 m 5,229 ft	114.9 km 71.4 mi	40.4882°N 121.5050°W
205	Kuwohi (Note: Kuwohi on the border of North Carolina is the highest point of the U.S. State of Tennessee and the Great Smoky Mountains.) (Note: The elevation of Kuwohi includes an adjustment of +0.062 m (0.2 ft) from NGVD 29 to NAVD 88.)	Tennessee; North Carolina	Great Smoky Mountains	2025 m 6,643 ft	1376 m 4,513 ft	113.9 km 70.7 mi	35.5629°N 83.4986°W
206	Anvil Peak (Note: The summit of Anvil Peak is the highest point of Semisopochnoi Island and the Rat Islands.) (Note: Anvil Peak is the westernmost summit of its elevation in Alaska, the United States, and greater North America.)	Alaska	Semisopochnoi Island	1221 m 4,007 ft	1221 m 4,007 ft	112.6 km 70 mi	51.9859°N 179.6021°E
207	Mount McLoughlin (Note: The summit of Mount McLoughlin is the highest point of the southern Oregon Cascades.) (Note: The elevation of Mount McLoughlin includes an adjustment of +1.306 m (4.28 ft) from NGVD 29 to NAVD 88.)	Oregon	Cascade Range	2895 m 9,499 ft	1364 m 4,475 ft	111.8 km 69.5 mi	42.4445°N 122.3156°W
208	Grand Teton (Note: The summit of Grand Teton is the highest point of the Teton Range.) (Note: Grand Teton is the northernmost and westernmost 4000-meter (13,123-foot) summit of the Rocky Mountains.)	Wyoming	Teton Range	4198.7 m 13,775 ft	1995 m 6,545 ft	111.6 km 69.4 mi	43.7412°N 110.8024°W
209	Kaibab Plateau High Point (Note: The elevation of Kaibab Plateau High Point includes an adjustment of +1.301 m (4.27 ft) from NGVD 29 to NAVD 88.)	Arizona	Kaibab Plateau	2812 m 9,224 ft	1100 m 3,610 ft	111.2 km 69.1 mi	36.3958°N 112.1509°W
210	Star Peak (Note: The summit of Star Peak is the highest point of the Humboldt Range.)	Nevada	Humboldt Range	2999.1 m 9,840 ft	1646 m 5,400 ft	111.1 km 69 mi	40.5224°N 118.1708°W
211	Cerro Atravesado (Sierra el Cerro Azul)	Oaxaca	Oaxaca	2310 m 7,579 ft	1510 m 4,954 ft	109.6 km 68.1 mi	16.7652°N 94.4514°W
212	White Mountain Peak (Note: The summit of White Mountain Peak is the highest point of the White Mountains.)	California	White Mountains	4344 m 14,252 ft	2193 m 7,196 ft	108.6 km 67.4 mi	37.6341°N 118.2557°W
213	Laramie Peak	Wyoming	Laramie Mountains	3132 m 10,276 ft	1011 m 3,317 ft	108.4 km 67.4 mi	42.2681°N 105.4425°W
214	Miller Peak (Note: The summit of Miller Peak is the highest point of the Huachuca Mountains.) (Note: The elevation of Miller Peak includes an adjustment of +1.067 m (3.5 ft) from NGVD 29 to NAVD 88.)	Arizona	Huachuca Mountains	2886 m 9,470 ft	1527 m 5,011 ft	107 km 66.5 mi	31.3928°N 110.2930°W
215	Kusilvak High Point	Alaska	Nulato Hills	885 m 2,905 ft	558 m 1,830 ft	105.8 km 65.7 mi	62.9285°N 161.7461°W
216	Copernicus Peak (Note: The elevation of Copernicus Peak includes an adjustment of +0.924 m (3.03 ft) from NGVD 29 to NAVD 88.)	California	Diablo Range	1336 m 4,383 ft	951 m 3,120 ft	104.9 km 65.2 mi	37.3468°N 121.6300°W
217	Cerro El Zamorano (Note: The summit of Cerro El Zamorano is the highest point of both Estado Libre y Soberano de Guanajuato and Estado Libre y Soberano de Querétaro.)	Querétaro; Guanajuato	Mexican Plateau	3370 m 11,056 ft	1450 m 4,757 ft	104.8 km 65.1 mi	20.9338°N 100.1805°W
218	Sugarloaf Mountain (Note: The elevation of Sugarloaf Mountain includes an adjustment of -0.119 m (-0.39 ft) from NGVD 29 to NAVD 88.)	Maine	Longfellow Mountains	1295 m 4,250 ft	969 m 3,178 ft	104.3 km 64.8 mi	45.0318°N 70.3132°W
219	Man O'War Peak (Note: The summit of Man O'War Peak is the highest point of the Kiglapait Mountains.)	Newfoundland and Labrador	Kiglapait Mountains	1050 m 3,445 ft	974 m 3,196 ft	103.9 km 64.6 mi	56.9686°N 61.6692°W
220	Thudaka Mountain (Note: The summit of Thudaka Mountain is the highest point of Cassiar Mountains.)	British Columbia	Cassiar Mountains	2748 m 9,016 ft	1739 m 5,705 ft	103.5 km 64.3 mi	57.9272°N 126.8485°W
221	Chiricahua Peak (Note: The summit of Chiricahua Peak is the highest point of the Chiricahua Mountains.) (Note: The elevation of Chiricahua Peak includes an adjustment of +1.173 m (3.85 ft) from NGVD 29 to NAVD 88.)	Arizona	Chiricahua Mountains	2976 m 9,763 ft	1569 m 5,149 ft	103.3 km 64.2 mi	31.8456°N 109.2910°W
222	Cerro Las Conchas	Michoacán	Michoacán	2890 m 9,482 ft	1960 m 6,430 ft	103.3 km 64.2 mi	18.7215°N 102.9740°W
223	Cerro Zempoaltépetl	Oaxaca	Sierra Madre de Oaxaca	3420 m 11,220 ft	1580 m 5,184 ft	103.2 km 64.1 mi	17.1324°N 96.0125°W
224	Cerro Grande (Note: The summit of Cerro Grande is the highest point of Estado Libre y Soberano de San Luis Potosí.)	San Luis Potosí	Mexican Plateau	3190 m 10,466 ft	500 m 1,640 ft	103.1 km 64.1 mi	23.6667°N 100.8873°W
225	Mount Harper	Alaska	Yukon–Tanana uplands	1994 m 6,543 ft	500 m 1,640 ft	102.7 km 63.8 mi	64.2370°N 143.8442°W
226	Mount Angayukaqsraq (Note: The summit of Mount Angayukaqsraq is the highest point of the Baird Mountains.)	Alaska	Brooks Range	1448 m 4,750 ft	1067 m 3,500 ft	102.4 km 63.6 mi	67.7083°N 159.4053°W
227	Mount Prindle	Alaska	Yukon–Tanana uplands	1611 m 5,286 ft	864 m 2,836 ft	101.2 km 62.9 mi	65.4610°N 146.4758°W
228	Bearpaw Baldy (Note: The summit of Bearpaw Baldy is the highest point of the Bearpaw Mountains.)	Montana	Bearpaw Mountains	2109.4 m 6,921 ft	1289 m 4,229 ft	101 km 62.8 mi	48.1487°N 109.6509°W
229	Renland High Point	Greenland	Island of Greenland	2200 m 7,218 ft	1950 m 6,398 ft	100.8 km 62.6 mi	71.3333°N 26.3333°W
230	Gran Piedra (Note: Gran Piedra is the northernmost summit of its elevation in the Caribbean.)	Cuba	Island of Cuba	1249 m 4,098 ft	500 m 1,640 ft	100.7 km 62.5 mi	20.0115°N 75.6270°W

== Gallery ==
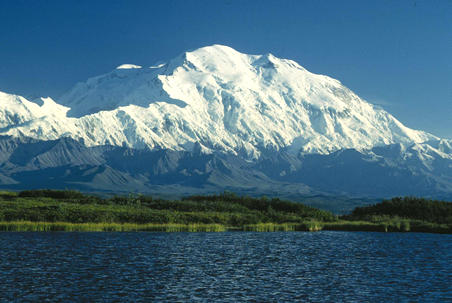
1. Denali in Alaska is the highest summit of the United States and North America.

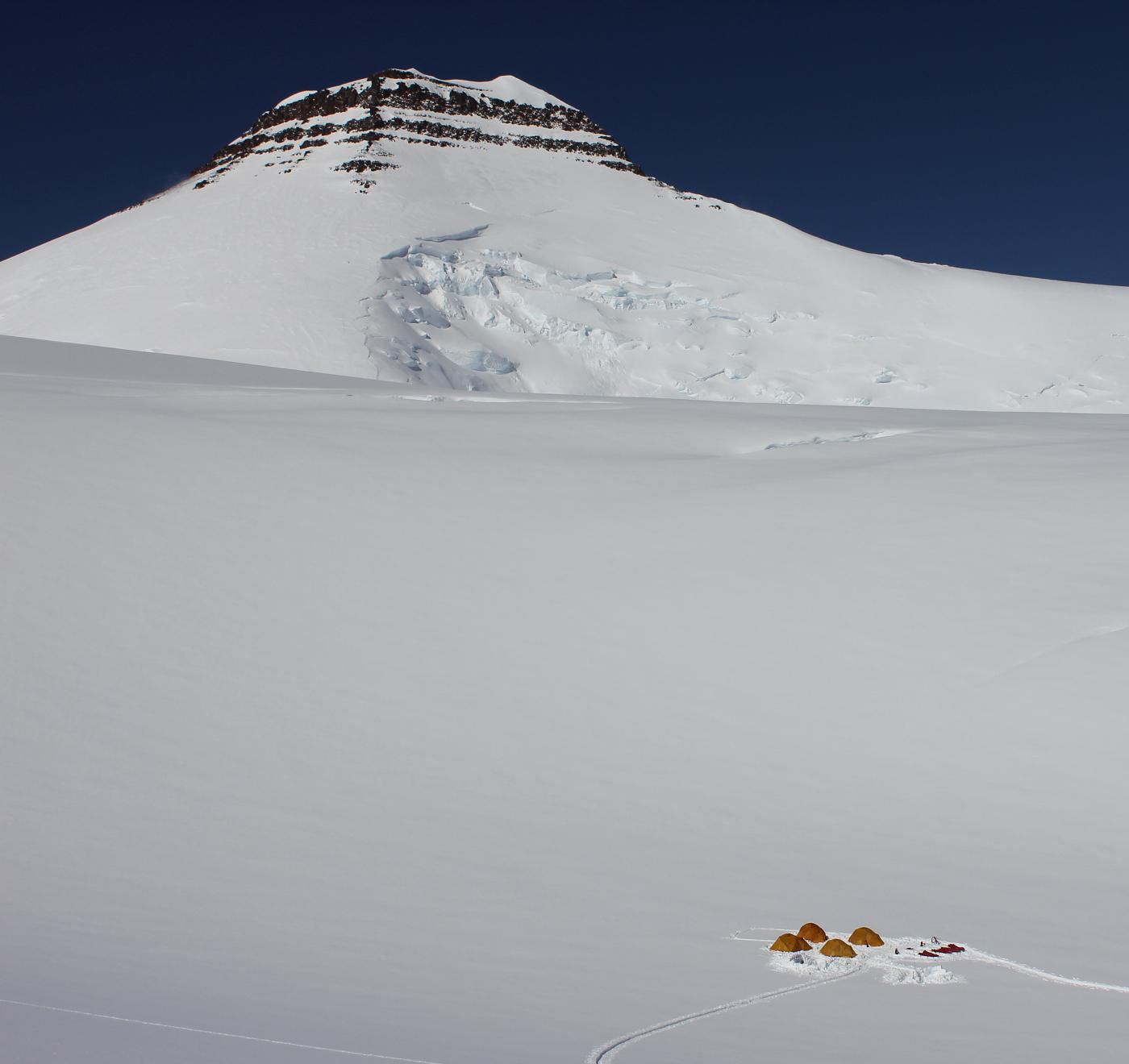
2. Gunnbjørn Fjeld is the highest summit of Greenland and all of the Arctic.

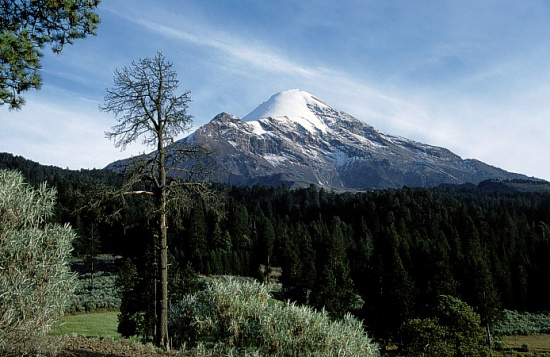
3. Pico de Orizaba is the highest summit of México.

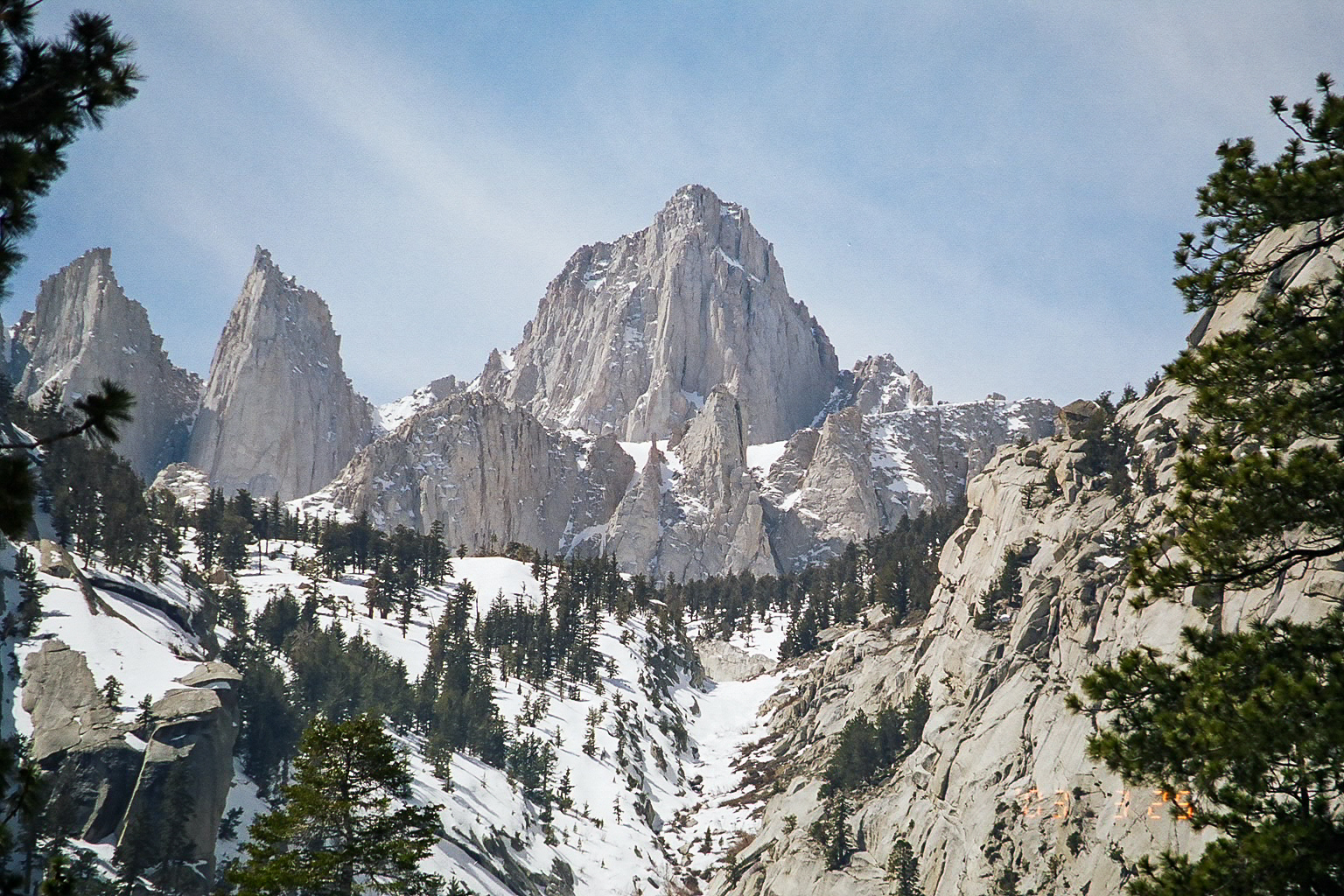
4. Mount Whitney highest summit of the Sierra Nevada and California.

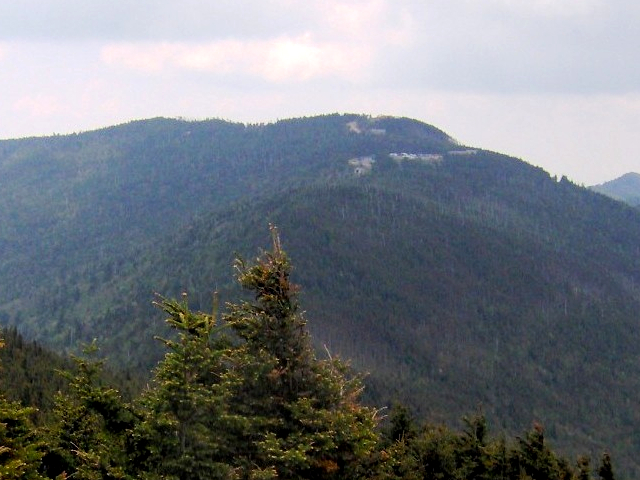
5. Mount Mitchell is the highest summit of North Carolina and the Appalachian Mountains.

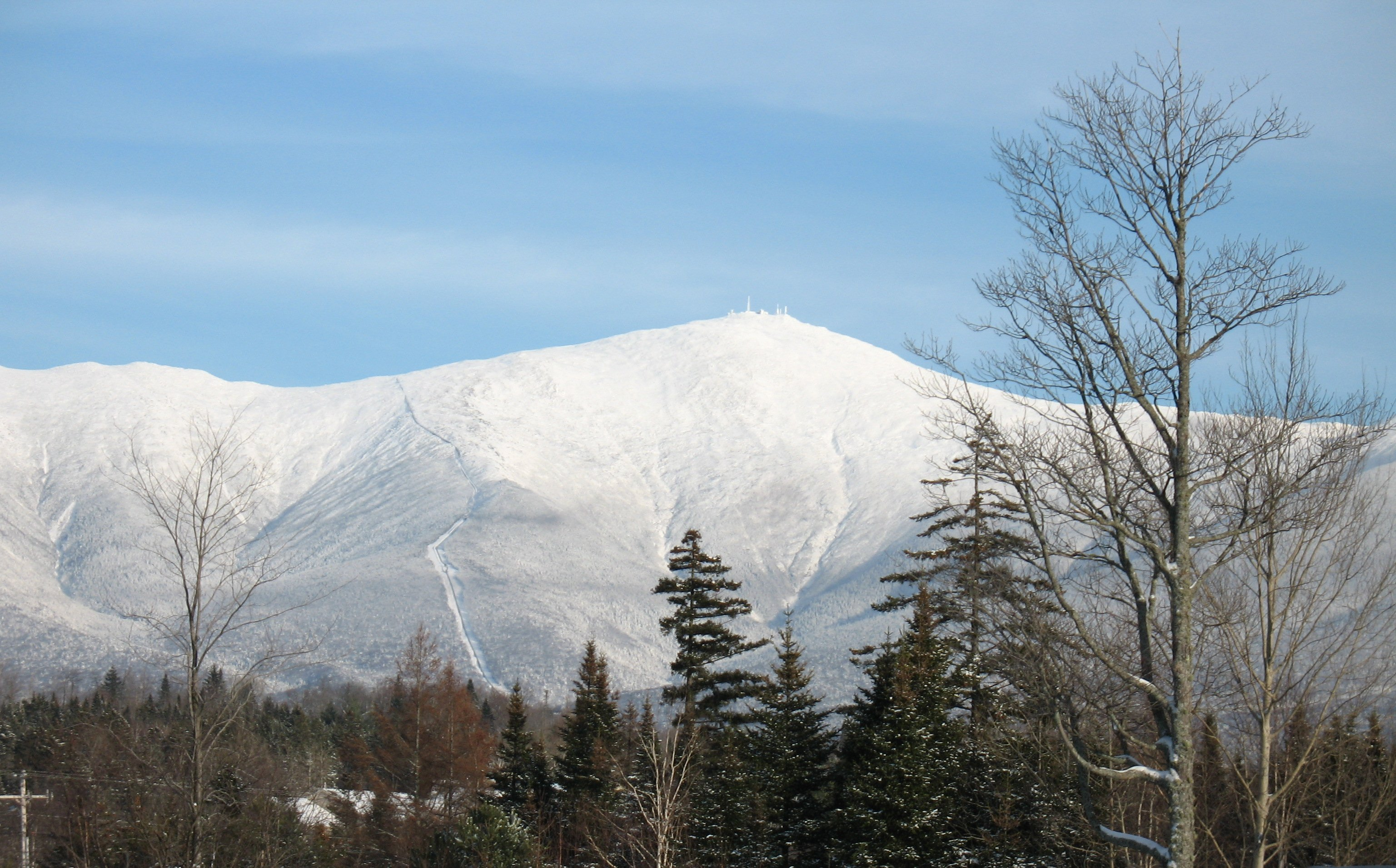
6. Mount Washington is the highest summit of the White Mountains and New Hampshire.

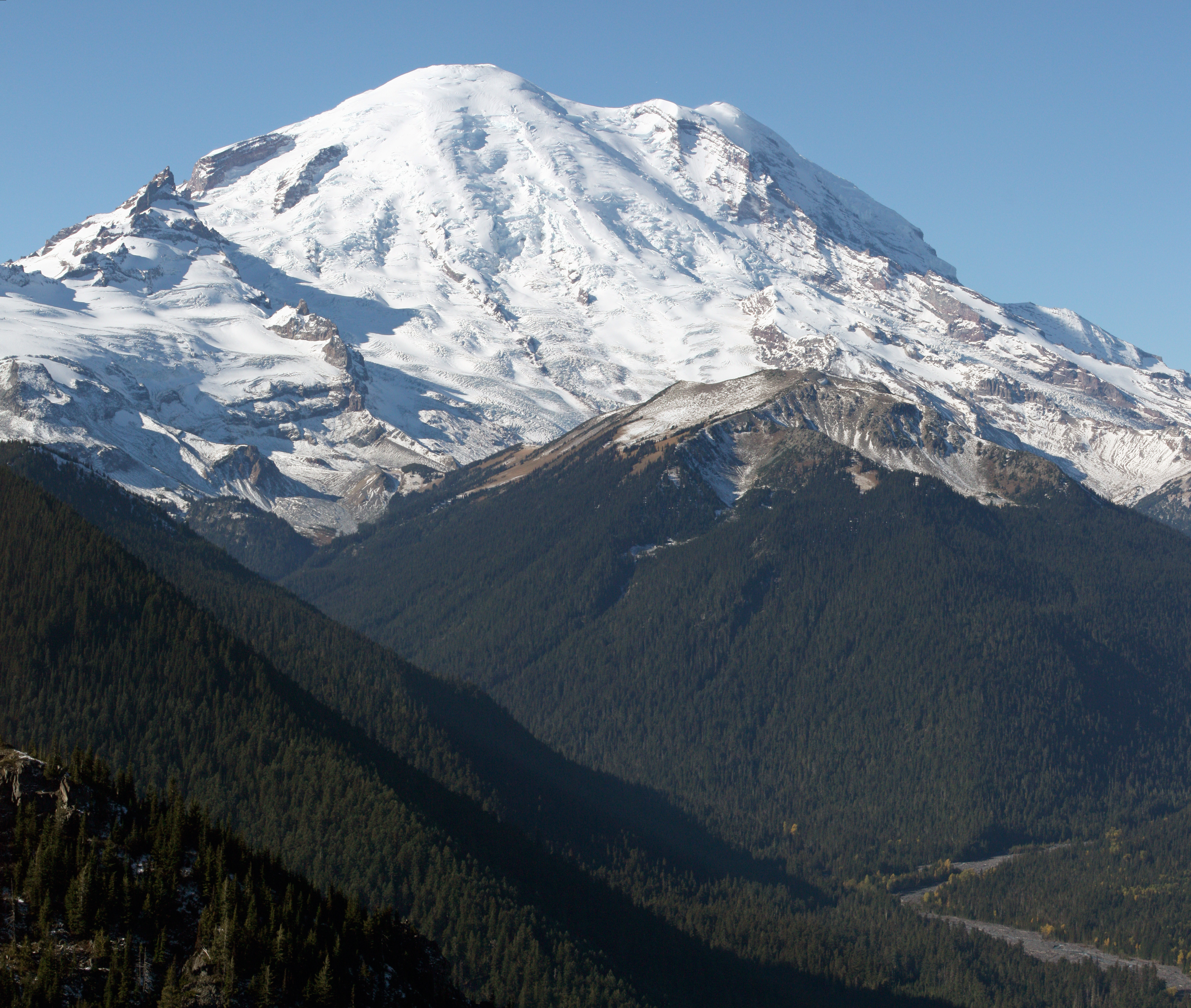
7. Mount Rainier is the highest summit of Washington and the Cascade Range.

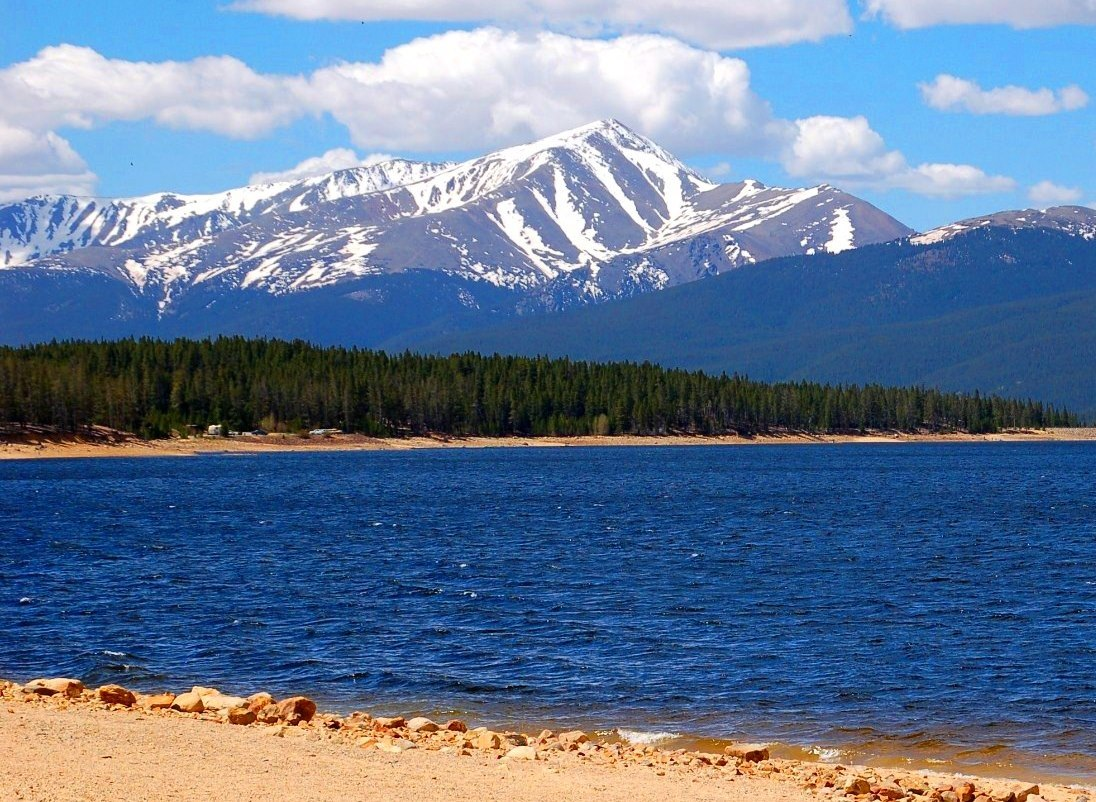
8. Mount Elbert is the highest summit of Colorado and the Rocky Mountains.

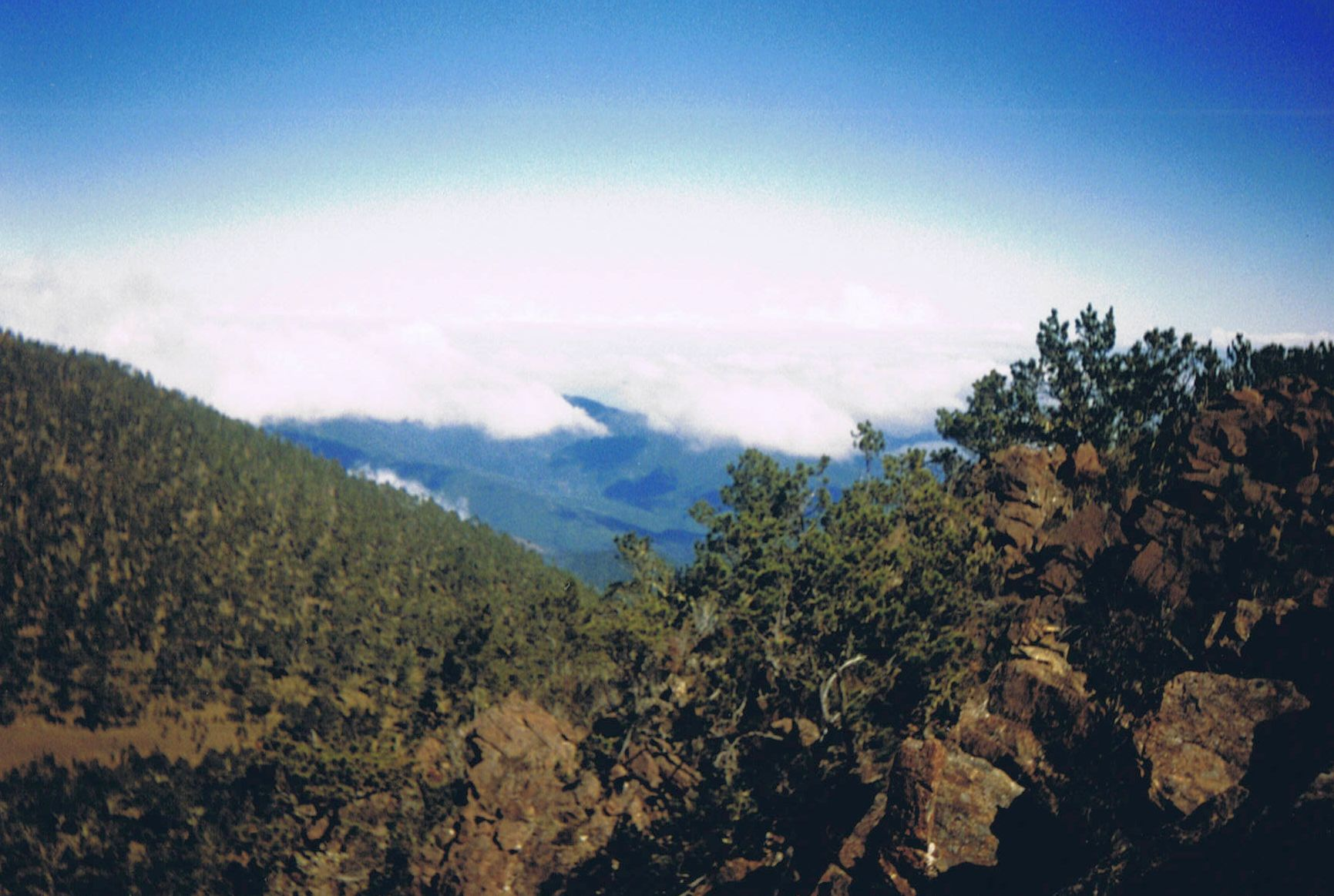
9. Pico Duarte in the Dominican Republic on Hispaniola is the highest summit in the Caribbean.

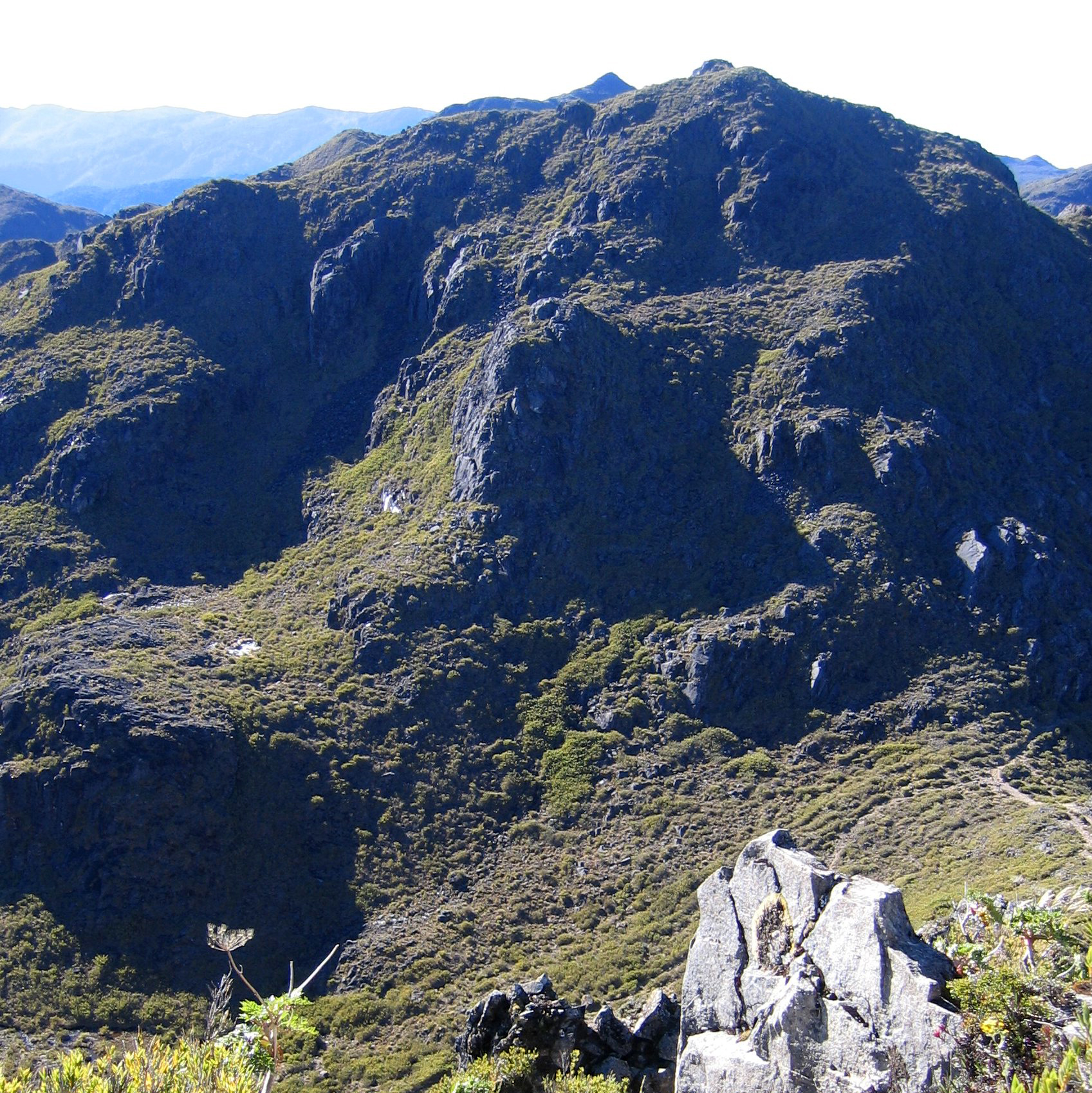
10. Chirripó Grande is the highest summit of Costa Rica.

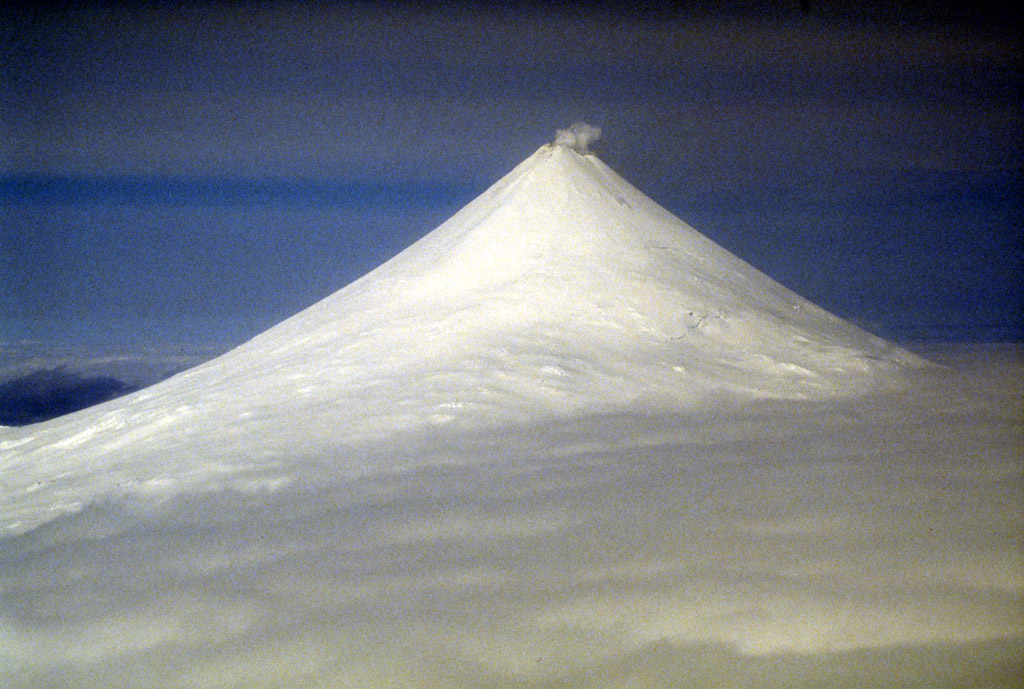
11. Mount Shishaldin on Unimak Island is the highest summit of the Aleutian Islands.

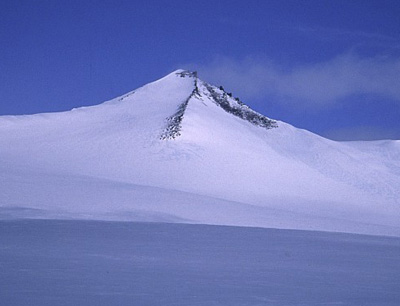
12. Barbeau Peak is the highest summit of Ellesmere Island and Nunavut.

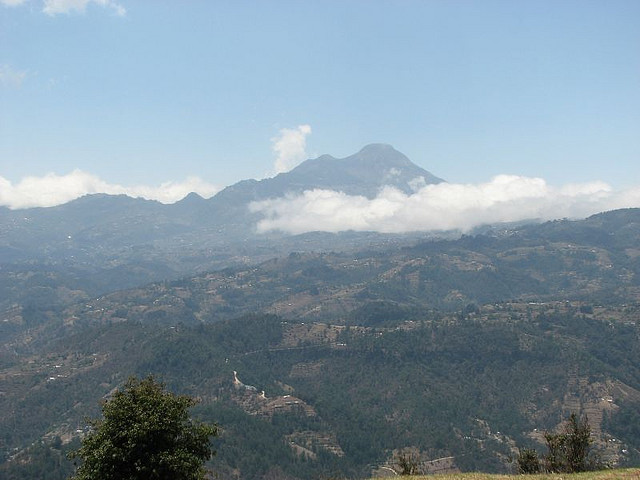
14. Volcán Tajumulco is the highest summit in Guatemala and all of Central America.

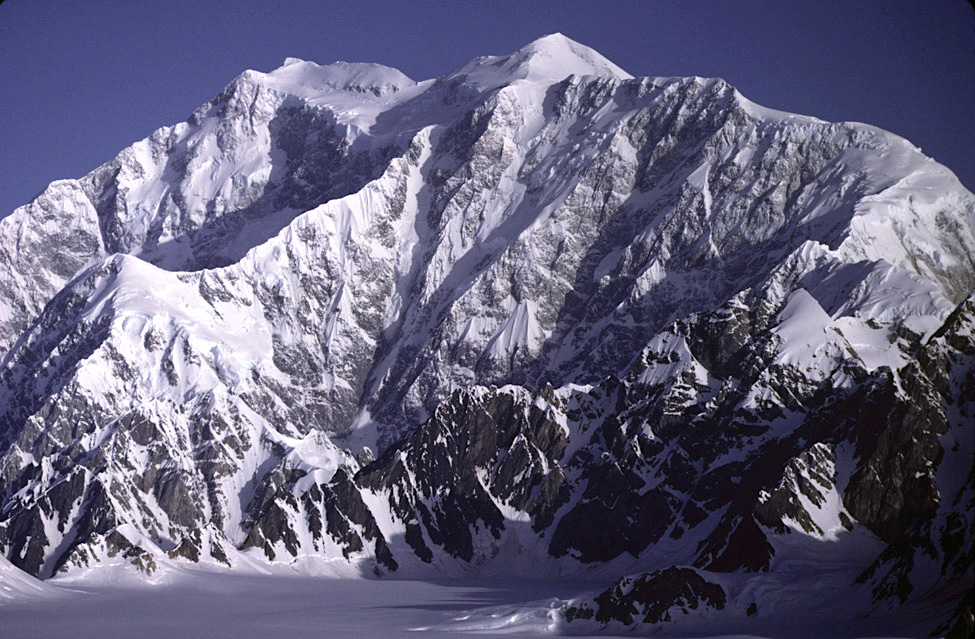
22. Mount Logan in Yukon is the highest summit of Canada.

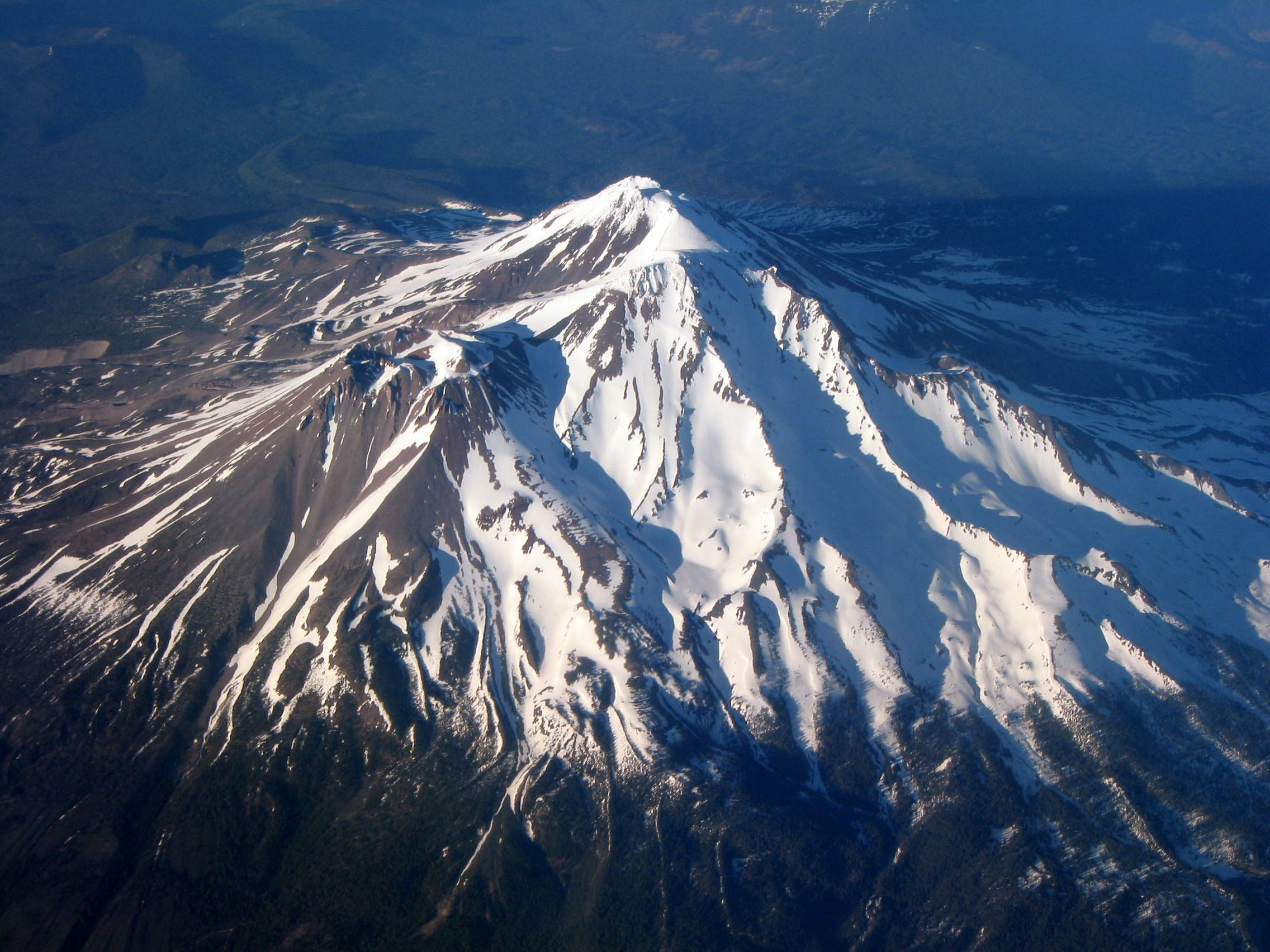
30. Mount Shasta in California is the highest summit of the southern Cascade Range.

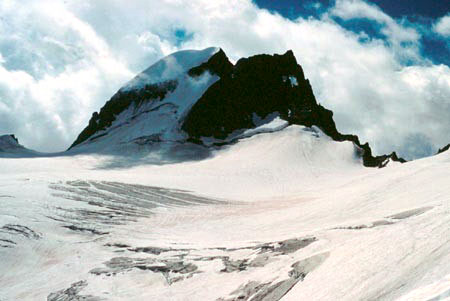
37. Gannett Peak is the highest summit of the Wind River Range and Wyoming.

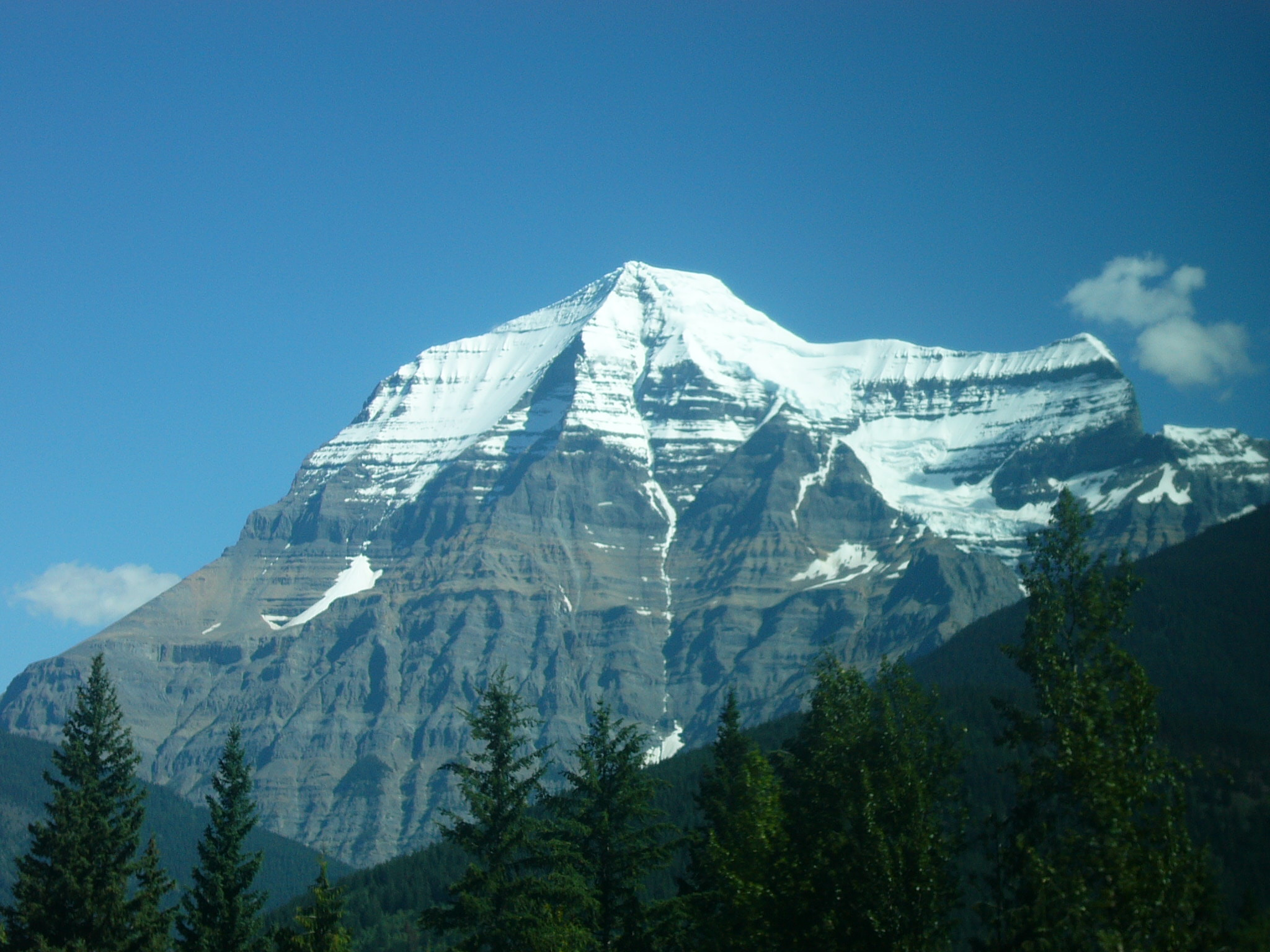
39. Mount Robson in British Columbia is the highest summit of the Canadian Rockies.

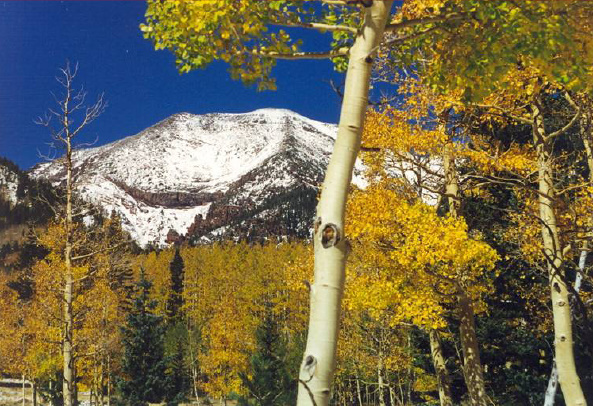
49. Humphreys Peak is the highest summit of the San Francisco Peaks and Arizona.

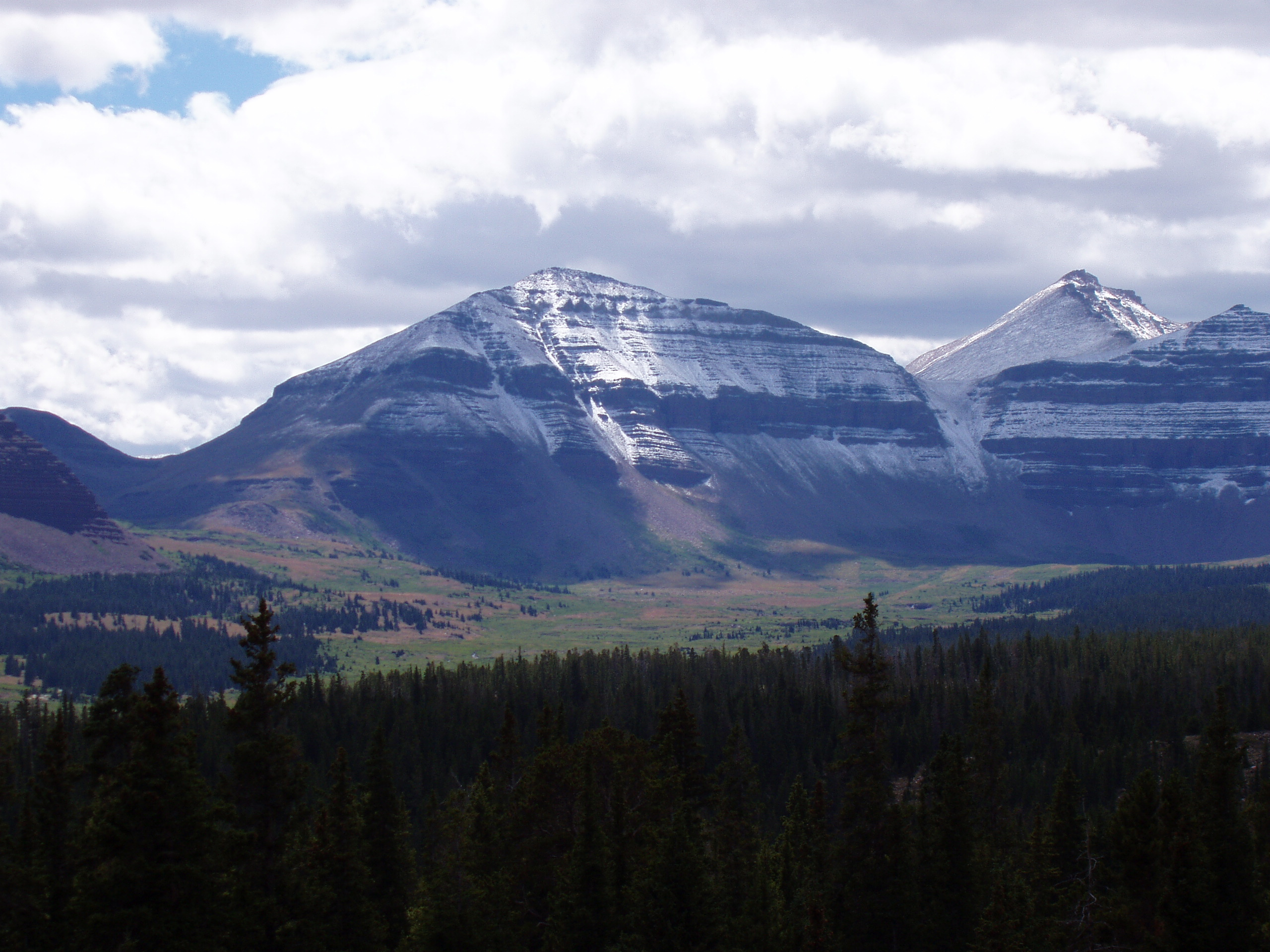
72. Kings Peak is the highest summit of the Uinta Range and Utah.

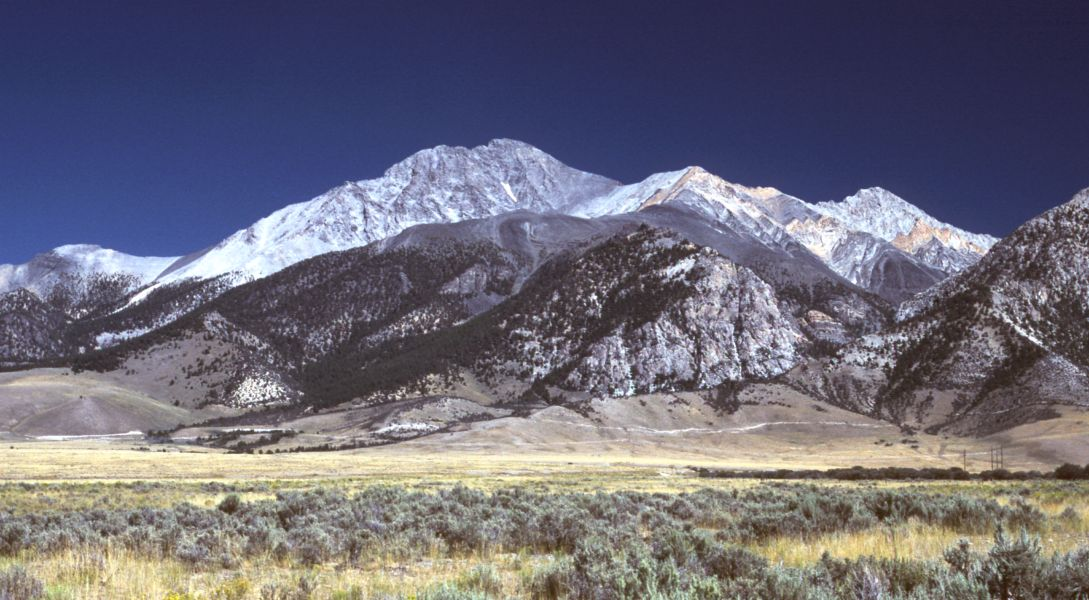
83. Borah Peak is the highest summit of the Lost River Range and Idaho.

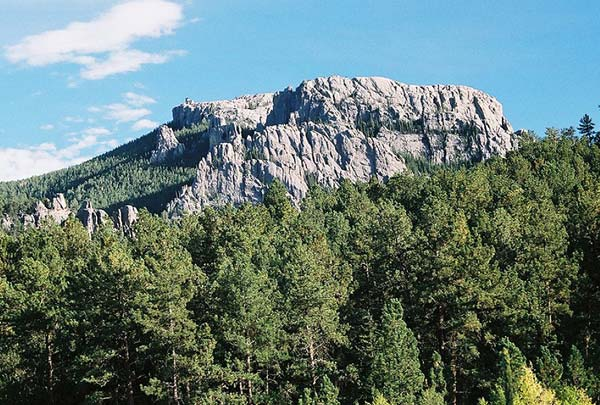
90. Black Elk Peak is the highest summit of the Black Hills and South Dakota.

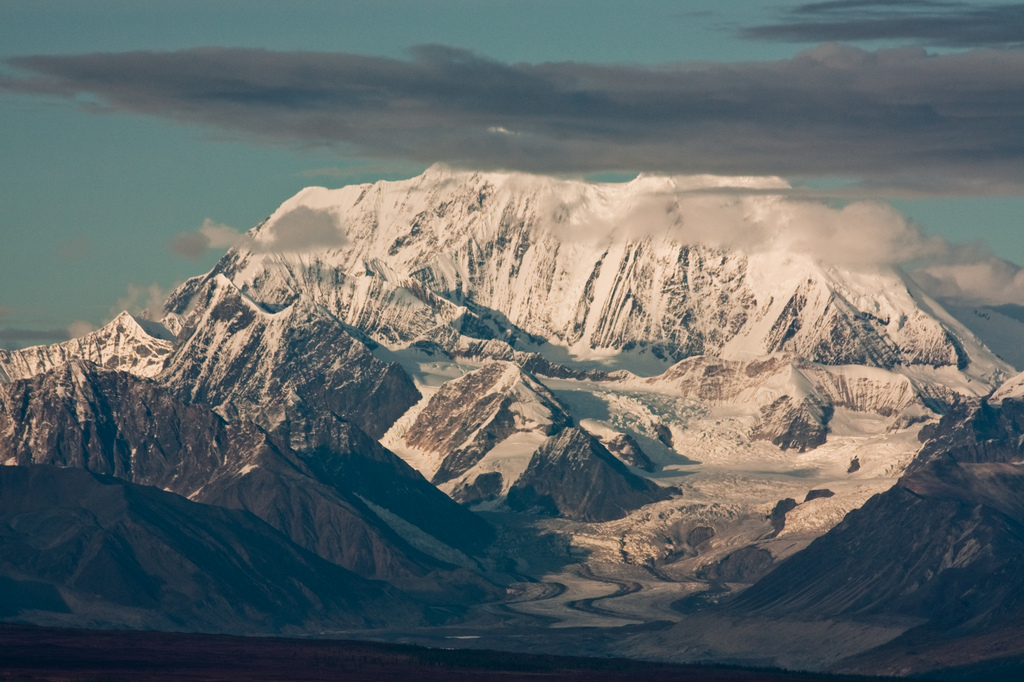
104. Mount Hayes is the highest summit of the eastern Alaska Range.

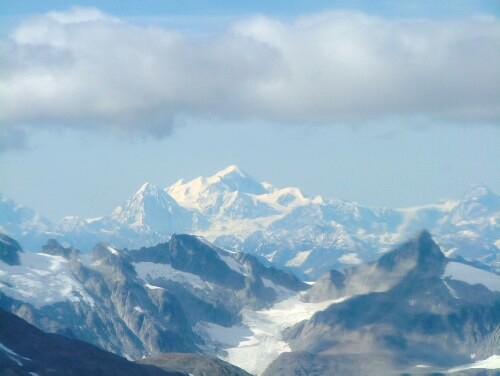
107. Mount Fairweather on the Alaska border is the highest summit of British Columbia.

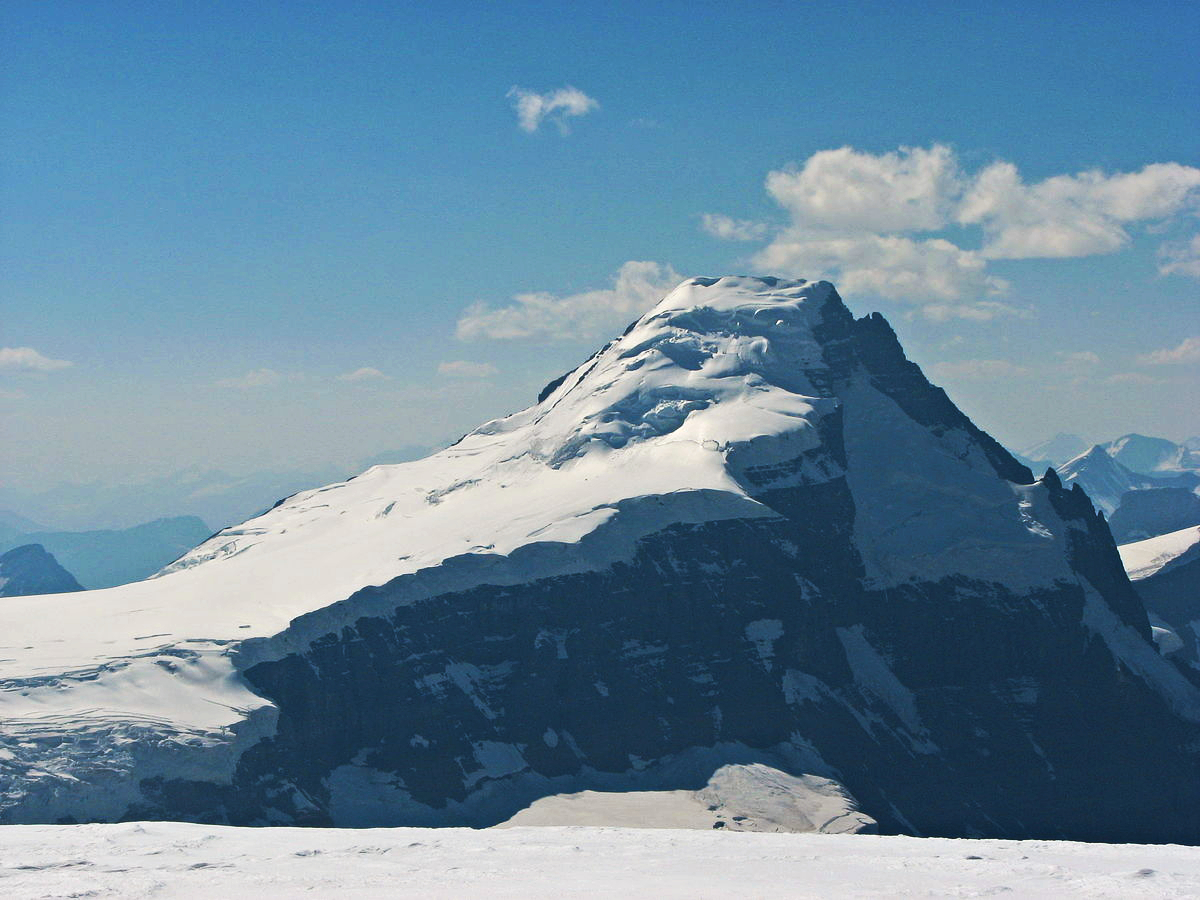
131. Mount Columbia on the British Columbia border is the highest summit of Alberta.

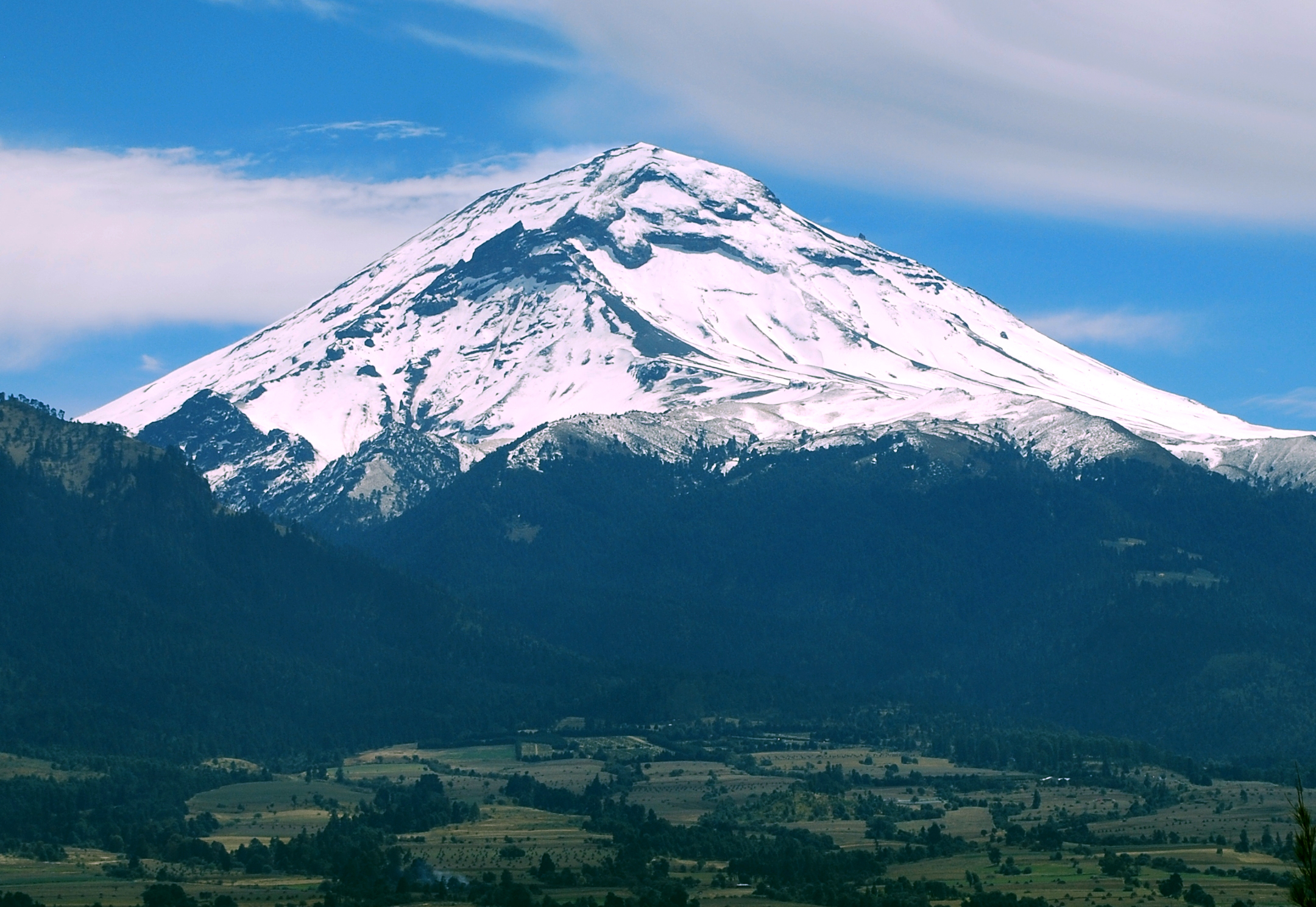
145. Popocatépetl is the second highest summit of México.

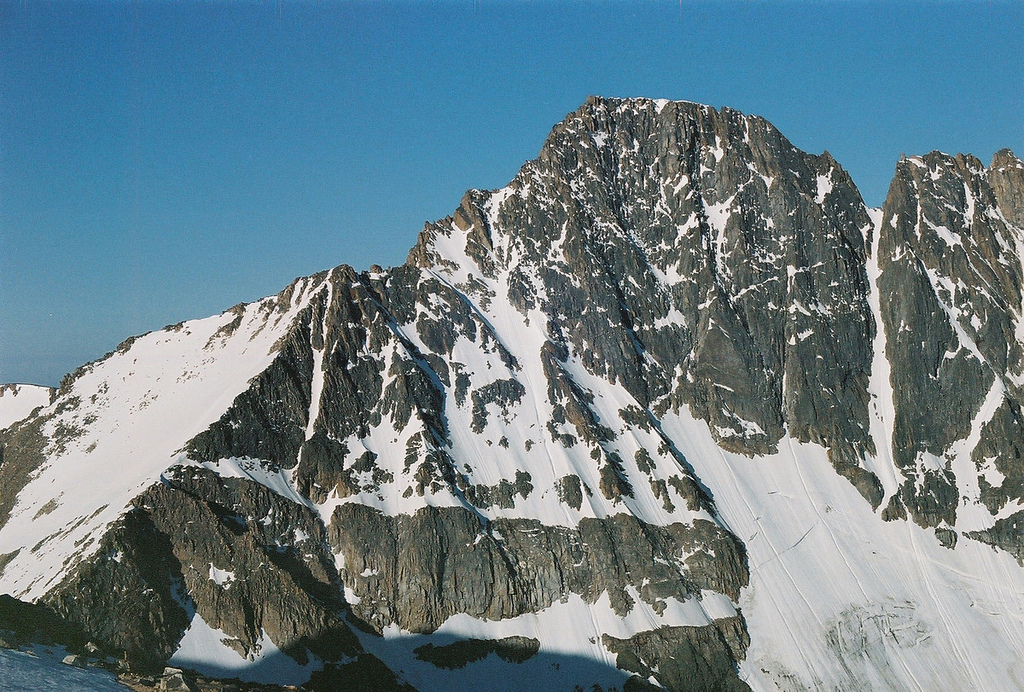
156. Granite Peak is the highest summit of the Beartooth Range and Montana.

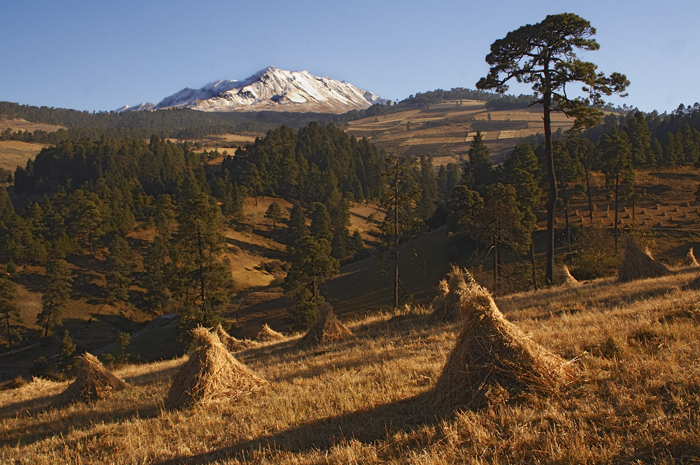
197. Nevado de Toluca is the fourth highest summit of México.

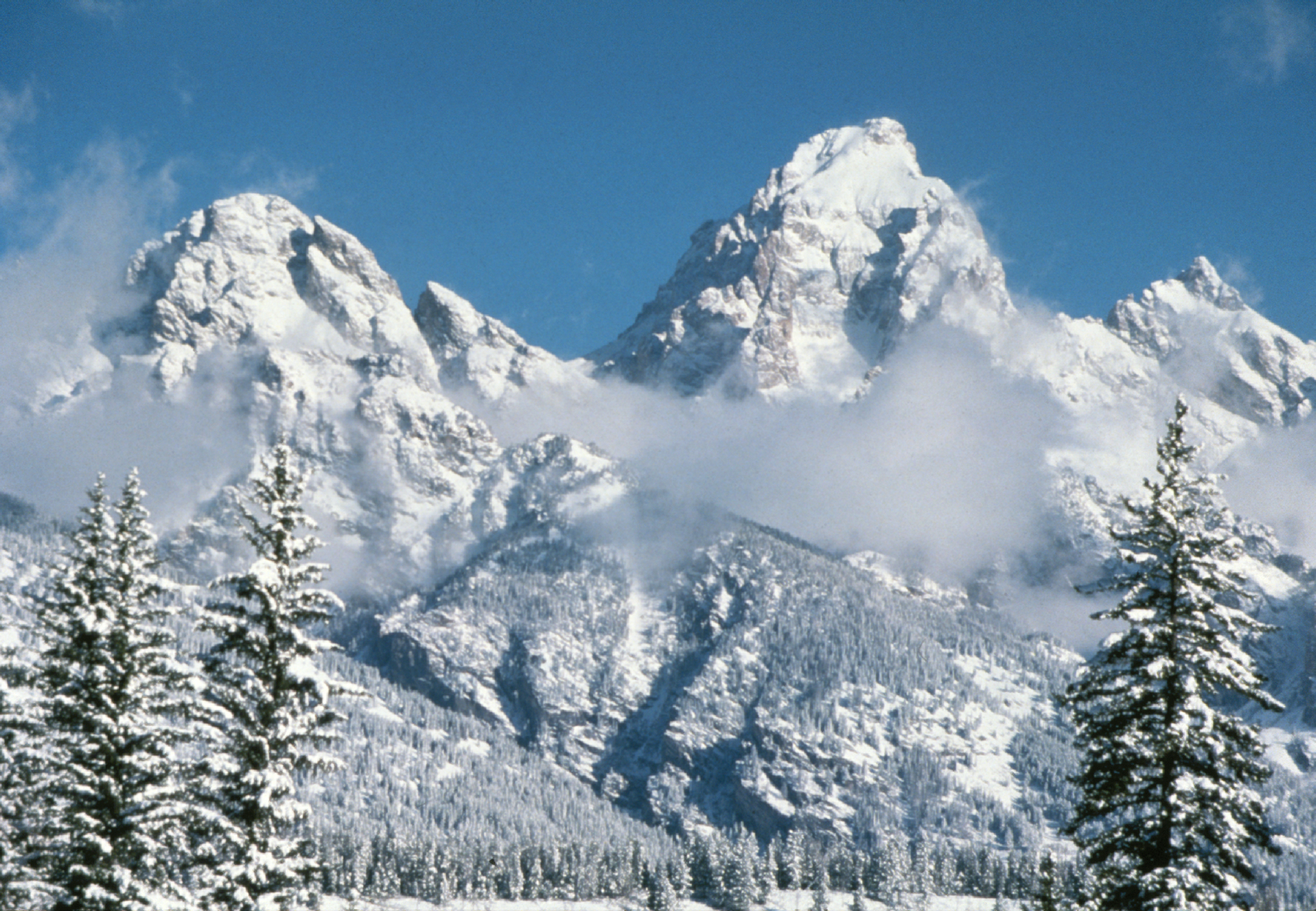
208. Grand Teton in Wyoming is the highest summit of the Teton Range.

== See also ==
- North America
  - Geography of North America
  - Geology of North America
  - Lists of mountain peaks of North America
    - List of mountain peaks of North America
      - List of the highest major summits of North America
        - List of the highest islands of North America
      - List of Ultras of North America
      - List of the major 100-kilometer summits of North America
      - List of extreme summits of North America
      - List of mountain peaks of Greenland
      - List of mountain peaks of Canada
      - List of mountain peaks of the Rocky Mountains
      - List of mountain peaks of the United States
      - List of mountain peaks of México
      - List of mountain peaks of Central America
      - List of mountain peaks of the Caribbean
    - Category:Mountains of North America
      - commons:Category:Mountains of North America
- Physical geography
  - Topography
    - Topographic elevation
    - Topographic prominence
    - Topographic isolation
