= Mount Yapeitso =

Mountain in Mont-Valin, Quebec, Canada

Highest point
- Peak: 1128
- Coordinates: 52.32194°N 70.44444°W

Geography
- Country: Canada
- Province: Quebec
- Administrative region: Saguenay–Lac-Saint-Jean
- MRC: Le Fjord-du-Saguenay Regional County Municipality
- Settlement: Otish Mountains

Mount Yapeitso is located in the unorganized territory of Mont-Valin, in the Le Fjord-du-Saguenay Regional County Municipality, in the administrative region of Saguenay–Lac-Saint-Jean, in Quebec, in Canada.

== Toponymy ==
In 1949, botanist Jacques Rousseau explored the Otish Mountains, which he designated as "the hydrographic hub of Quebec". As of January 1950, he informed the secretary of the Commission de géographie du Québec of a project to name the geographical entities included in these mountains. In an article entitled “The Rise and Fall of the Watshish Mountains”, published in 1959, Rousseau presented his toponymic proposals, including the name “Bignell Peak” to designate Mount Yapeitso. This name refers to Frank Bignell, an assistant surveyor whom Rousseau considers to be probably the first white man to have climbed the mountain at the end of the previous century. Frank Bignell was the son of John Bignell (1817-1902), the surveyor who explored the Lake Mistassini area with geologist Albert Peter Low in 1885.

Rousseau knew that this mountain was called “Mount Yapeitso” by the Nichicoun Amerindians (members of the Naskapi nation), “yapeits” meaning “male caribou”. He chose to preserve this name by attributing it to the lake which borders the north-eastern side of the mountain (this sheet of water is now called lake of the Ptarmigan). In 1971, the Commission de géographie du Québec chose to rehabilitate the Amerindian name and formalize the name of the mountain in the form Mont Yapeitso .

The toponym "mont Yapeitso" was registered on November 18, 1971, in the Quebec Place Names Bank of the Commission de toponymie du Québec.

== Geography ==
Culminating at 1,128 metres (3,701 ft) above sea level, Mount Yapeitso stands on the south-eastern flank of the Otish Mountains, about 230 km west of Fermont, located in the Côte-Nord region. It straddles the boundaries of the municipality of Eeyou Istchee James Bay and the MRC of Le Fjord-du-Saguenay Regional County Municipality.

The nearest towns are Baie-Comeau and Chibougamau.

== See also ==
- Otish Mountains
