= Otish Mountains =

Mountain range in Quebec, Canada

Monts Otish
- Location within Quebec

Highest point
- Peak: Mont Yapeitso
- Elevation: 1,135 m (3,724 ft)
- Coordinates: 52°19′20.28″N 70°26′42.36″W

Geography
- Country: Canada
- Province: Quebec

The Monts Otish (Otish Mountains) are a range of tall hills in the geographic centre of Quebec, Canada, north of Lac Mistassini and Manicouagan Reservoir. Within the tall hills is the Réserve faunique des Lacs-Albanel-Mistassini-et-Waconichi.

== Gallery ==
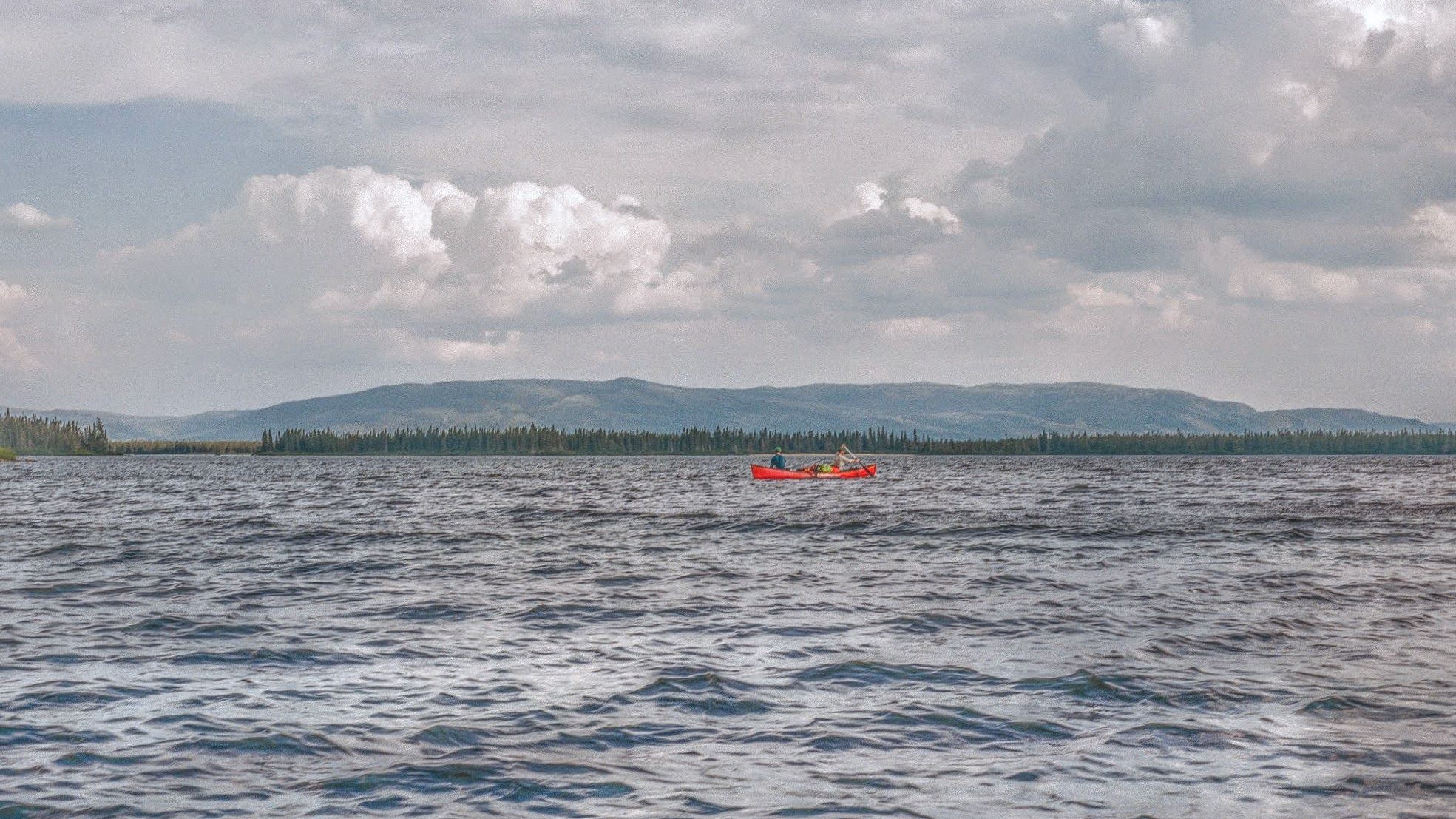
Otish Mountains from the upper Eastmain River

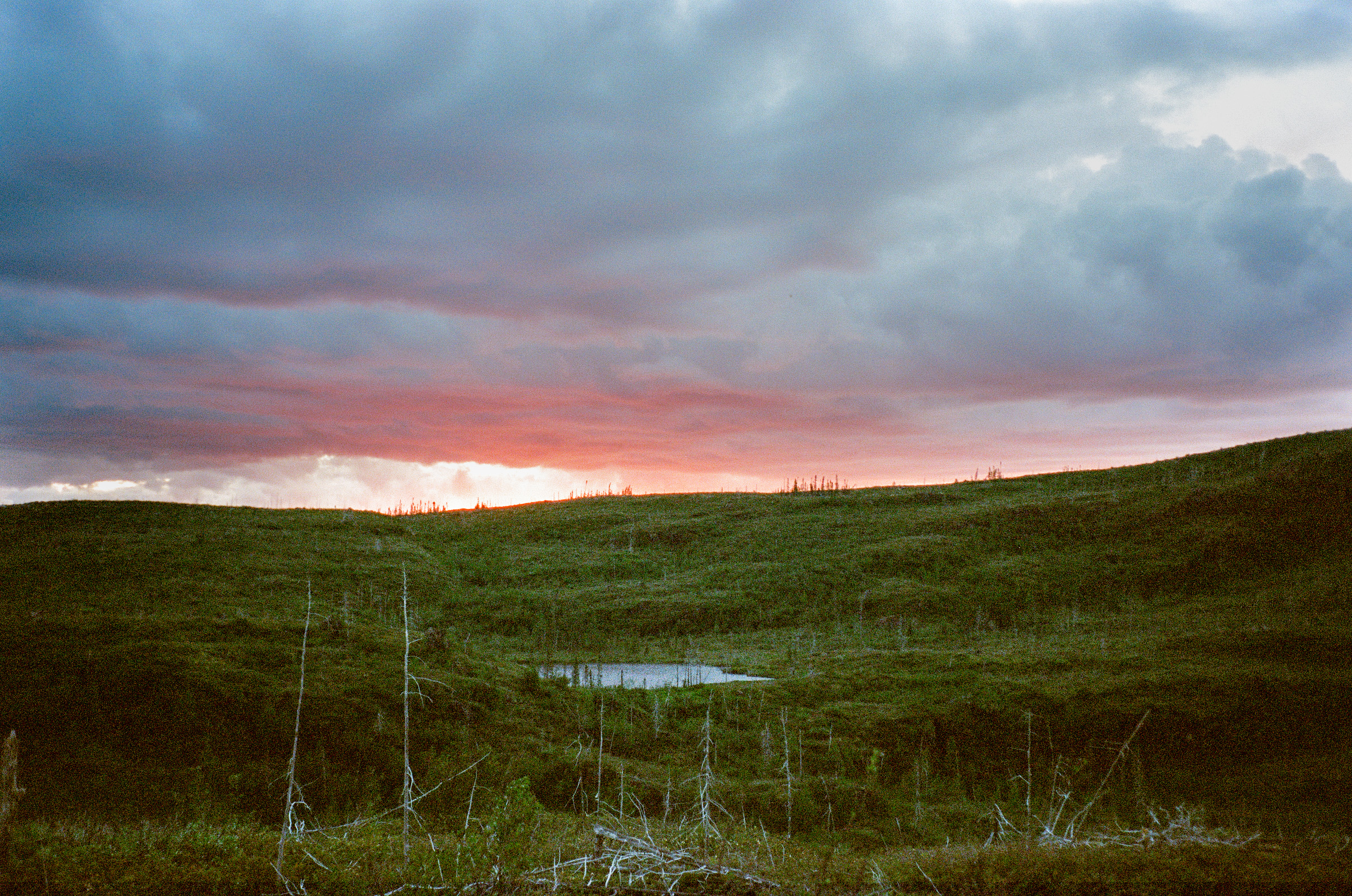
Sunset over burned forest plateau in Otish Mountains

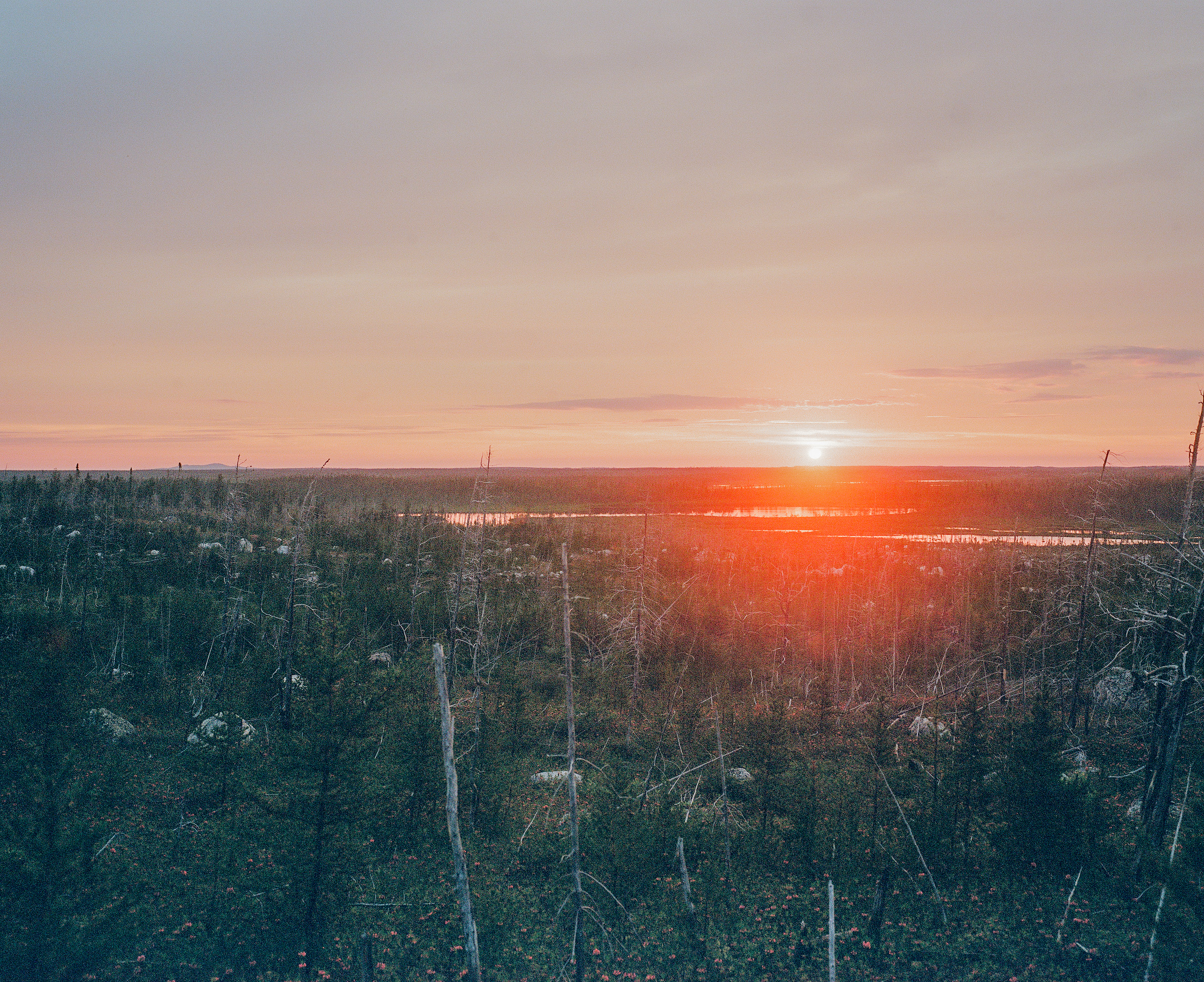
Sunset over upper Eastmain River from Otish Mountains
