= List of seismic faults in Mexico =

List of seismic fault (and systems, zones) in Mexico

== Baja California Peninsula ==
- Agua Blanca Fault
- Borrego Fault
- El Carrizal Fault
- La Paz Fault
- San Miguel Fault Zone

== Gulf of California Rift Zone (GCRZ) ==
From north to south

- Imperial Fault
- El Indiviso Fault
- Cerro Prieto Fault
- Laguna Salada Fault
- Ballenas Fault
- Partida Fault
- San Lorenzo Fault
- Guaymas Fault
- Carmen Fault
- Farallon Fault
- Atl Fault
- Murillo Fault
- Pescadero Fault
- Tamayo Fault
- Rivera Transform Fault
- Santa Anna Madrid Fault

== Yucatán ==
Santa Maria Fault

== Central Mexico ==
- Acambay-Tixmadejé Fault System
- Pastores Fault
- Venta de Bravo-Pastores Fault System
- Chapala-Tula Fault Zone

== Southern Mexico ==
- Chixoy-Polochic Fault
- Motagua Fault
- Oaxaca Fault
- Donaji Fault
