= Gulf of California Rift Zone =

Northernmost extension of the East Pacific Rise

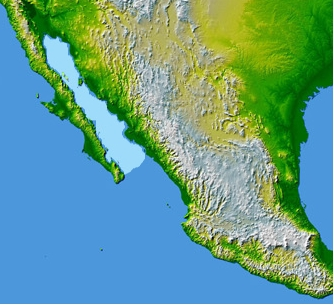

The Gulf of California Rift Zone (GCRZ) is the northernmost extension of the East Pacific Rise which extends some 1,300 km (800 mi) from the mouth of the Gulf of California to the southern terminus of the San Andreas Fault at the Salton Sink.

The GCRZ is an incipient rift zone akin to the Red Sea Rift. In the GCRZ continental crust originally associated with the North American plate has been pulled apart by tectonic forces and is being replaced by newly formed oceanic crust and seafloor spreading. The rifting has resulted in the transfer of the Baja California peninsula to the Pacific plate.

== List of GCRZ transform faults ==
From north to south:

- Imperial Fault Zone
- Cerro Prieto Fault
- Ballenas Fault
- Partida Fault
- San Lorenzo Fault
- Guaymas Fault
- Carmen Fault
- Farallon Fault
- Atl Fault
- Pescadero Fault
- Tamayo Fault

== List of GCRZ rift basins ==
From north to south:

- Brawley seismic zone
- Cerro Prieto
- Wagner Basin
- Consag Basin
- Adair-Tepoca Basin
- Tiburon Basin
- Delfin Basin
- San Pedro Martir Basin
- Guaymas Basin
- Carmen Basin
- Farallon Basin
- Pescadero Basin
- Alarcon Basin
