= List of extreme summits of Mexico =

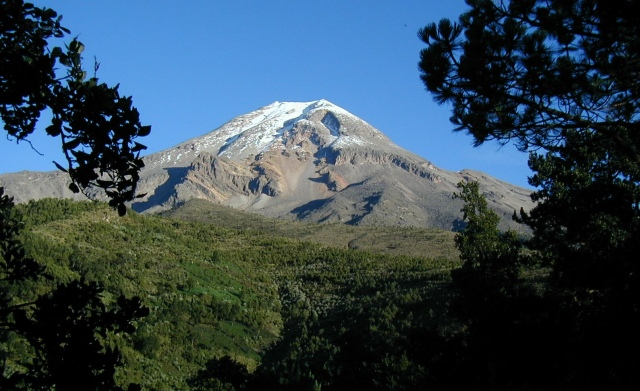
Pico de Orizaba (Citlaltépetl), a stratovolcano on the boundary between the states of Puebla and Veracruz, is the highest mountain peak of Mexico.

This article comprises four sortable tables of mountain summits of Mexico that are higher than any other point north or south of their latitude or east or west their longitude in Mexico.

The summit of a mountain or hill may be measured in three principal ways:

1. The topographic elevation of a summit measures the height of the summit above a geodetic sea level.
2. The topographic prominence of a summit is a measure of how high the summit rises above its surroundings.
3. The topographic isolation (or radius of dominance) of a summit measures how far the summit lies from its nearest point of equal elevation.

== Northernmost high summits ==
The northernmost summits of their elevation in Mexico
Rank	Mountain Peak	State	Mountain range	Elevation	Prominence	Isolation	Location
4	Cerro las Capillas	Jalisco	Trans-Mexican Volcanic Belt	2890 m 9,482 ft	1590 m 5,217 ft	55.8 km 34.7 mi	19.5552°N 104.1472°W
3	La Malinche (volcano) (Note: La Malinche (volcano) on the border of Puebla is the highest point of Tlaxcala.) (Note: La Malintzin is the northernmost summit of its elevation in Mexico.) (Matlalcueye)	Puebla; Tlaxcala	Trans-Mexican Volcanic Belt	4430 m 14,534 ft	1920 m 6,299 ft	63.9 km 39.7 mi	19.2310°N 98.0321°W
2	Iztaccíhuatl (Note: Iztaccíhuatl is the northernmost and westernmost 5000-meter (16,404-foot) summit of Mexico.)	México; Puebla	Trans-Mexican Volcanic Belt	5230 m 17,159 ft	1560 m 5,118 ft	17.51 km 10.88 mi	19.1802°N 98.6415°W
1	Pico de Orizaba (Note: The summit of Pico de Orizaba is the highest point of Puebla, Veracruz, and all of Mexico.) (Citlaltépetl)	Puebla; Veracruz	Trans-Mexican Volcanic Belt	5636 m 18,491 ft	4922 m 16,148 ft	2,690 km 1,672 mi	19.0305°N 97.2698°W

== Southernmost high summits ==
The southernmost summits of their elevation in Mexico
Rank	Mountain Peak	State	Mountain range	Elevation	Prominence	Isolation	Location
3	Volcán Tacaná (Note: Volcán Tacaná on the international border with Guatemala is the highest point of Chiapas.)	Chiapas; Guatemala	Sierra Madre de Chiapas	4067 m 13,343 ft	1037 m 3,402 ft	24.1 km 14.99 mi	15.1323°N 92.1084°W
2	Popocatépetl (Note: Popocatépetl on the border of Puebla is the highest point of both State of Mexico and Morelos.) (Note: Popocatépetl is the southernmost 5000-meter (16,404-foot) summit of Mexico and greater North America.)	México; Morelos; Puebla	Trans-Mexican Volcanic Belt	5410 m 17,749 ft	3040 m 9,974 ft	143 km 88.8 mi	19.0225°N 98.6278°W
1	Pico de Orizaba (Citlaltépetl)	Puebla; Veracruz	Trans-Mexican Volcanic Belt	5636 m 18,491 ft	4922 m 16,148 ft	2,690 km 1,672 mi	19.0305°N 97.2698°W

== Easternmost high summits ==
The easternmost summits of their elevation in Mexico
Rank	Mountain Peak	State	Mountain range	Elevation	Prominence	Isolation	Location
3	Volcán Tacaná	Chiapas; Guatemala	Sierra de Istatan	4067 m 13,343 ft	1037 m 3,402 ft	24.1 km 14.99 mi	15.1323°N 92.1084°W
2	Cofre de Perote (Note: Cofre de Perote is the easternmost summit of its elevation in Mexico.)	Veracruz	Trans-Mexican Volcanic Belt	4210 m 13,812 ft	1340 m 4,396 ft	52.9 km 32.9 mi	19.4940°N 97.1480°W
1	Pico de Orizaba (Citlaltépetl)	Puebla; Veracruz	Trans-Mexican Volcanic Belt	5636 m 18,491 ft	4922 m 16,148 ft	2,690 km 1,672 mi	19.0305°N 97.2698°W

== Westernmost high summits ==
The westernmost summits of their elevation in Mexico
Rank	Mountain Peak	State	Mountain range	Elevation	Prominence	Isolation	Location
10	Guadalupe Island high point (Note: The summit of Guadalupe Island is the westernmost 1000-meter (3281-foot) summit of Mexico.)	Baja California	Guadalupe Island	1310 m 4,298 ft	1310 m 4,298 ft	340 km 211 mi	29.1016°N 118.3132°W
9	Picacho del Diablo (Note: The summit of Picacho del Diablo is the highest point of Sierra de San Pedro Mártir and the Baja California Peninsula.) (Note: Picacho del Diablo is the northernmost and westernmost 3000-meter (9843-foot) summit and ultra-prominent summit of Mexico.)	Baja California	Sierra de San Pedro Mártir	3095 m 10,154 ft	2125 m 6,972 ft	335 km 208 mi	30.9925°N 115.3753°W
8	Cerro Mohinora (Note: The summit of Cerro Mohinora is the highest point of Chihuahua.) (Note: Cerro Mohinora is the northernmost and westernmost summit of its elevation in Mexico.)	Chihuahua	Sierra Madre Occidental	3308 m 10,853 ft	858 m 2,815 ft	231 km 143.5 mi	25.9560°N 107.0476°W
7	Cerro Gordo (Note: The summit of Cerro Gordo is the highest point of the Sierra Madre Occidental and Durango.) (Note: Cerro Gordo is the westernmost summit of its elevation in Mexico.)	Durango	Sierra Madre Occidental	3357 m 11,014 ft	1387 m 4,551 ft	424 km 263 mi	23.2060°N 104.9442°W
6	Volcán de Colima (Note: Volcán de Colima on the border of Jalisco is the highest point of Colima and the westernmost summit of its elevation in Mexico.)	Colima; Jalisco	Trans-Mexican Volcanic Belt	3830 m 12,566 ft	610 m 2,001 ft	5.62 km 3.49 mi	19.5132°N 103.6174°W
5	Nevado de Colima (Note: The summit of Nevado de Colima is the highest point of Jalisco.) (Note: Nevado de Colima is the northernmost and westernmost 4000-meter (13,123-foot) summit of Mexico.)	Jalisco	Trans-Mexican Volcanic Belt	4270 m 14,009 ft	2720 m 8,924 ft	405 km 252 mi	19.5633°N 103.6087°W
4	Nevado de Toluca (Note: Nevado de Toluca is the westernmost summit of its elevation in Mexico.) (Volcán Xinantécatl)	México	Trans-Mexican Volcanic Belt	4690 m 15,387 ft	2225 m 7,300 ft	118.4 km 73.6 mi	19.1020°N 99.7677°W
3	Iztaccíhuatl	México; Puebla	Trans-Mexican Volcanic Belt	5230 m 17,159 ft	1560 m 5,118 ft	17.51 km 10.88 mi	19.1802°N 98.6415°W
2	Popocatépetl	México; Morelos; Puebla	Trans-Mexican Volcanic Belt	5410 m 17,749 ft	3040 m 9,974 ft	143 km 88.8 mi	19.0225°N 98.6278°W
1	Pico de Orizaba (Citlaltépetl)	Puebla; Veracruz	Trans-Mexican Volcanic Belt	5636 m 18,491 ft	4922 m 16,148 ft	2,690 km 1,672 mi	19.0305°N 97.2698°W

== Gallery ==
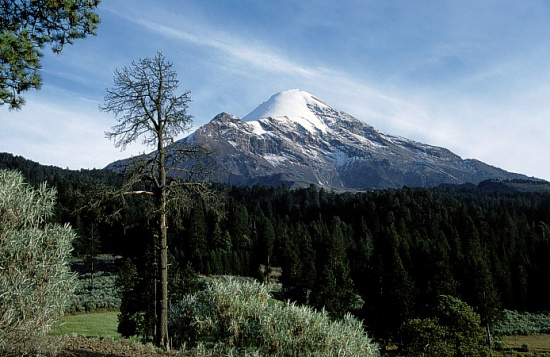
The summit of Pico de Orizaba, a stratovolcano on the border between Puebla and Veracruz, is the highest peak of Mexico.

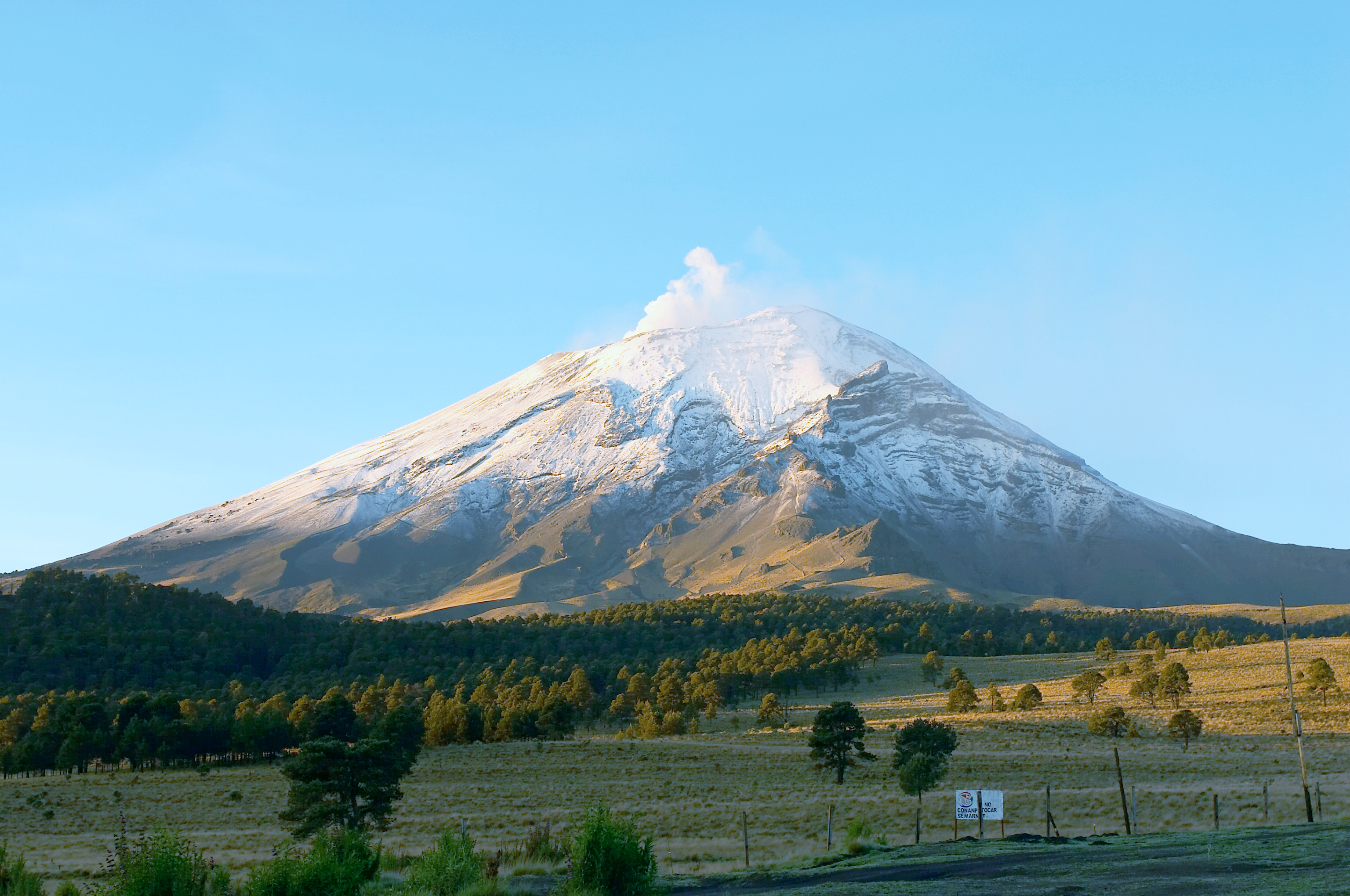
The summit of Popocatépetl, a stratovolcano at the junction of Puebla, State of Mexico and Morelos, is the second highest peak of Mexico.

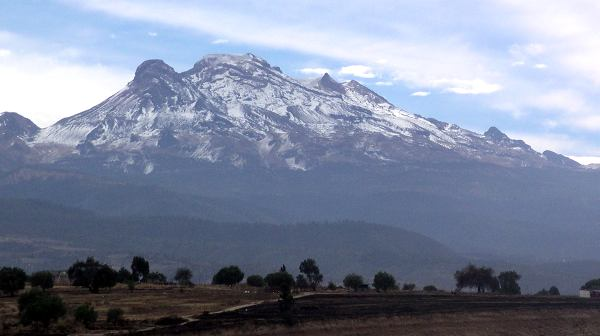
The summit of Iztaccíhuatl, a stratovolcano on the border between Puebla and State of Mexico, is the third highest peak of Mexico.

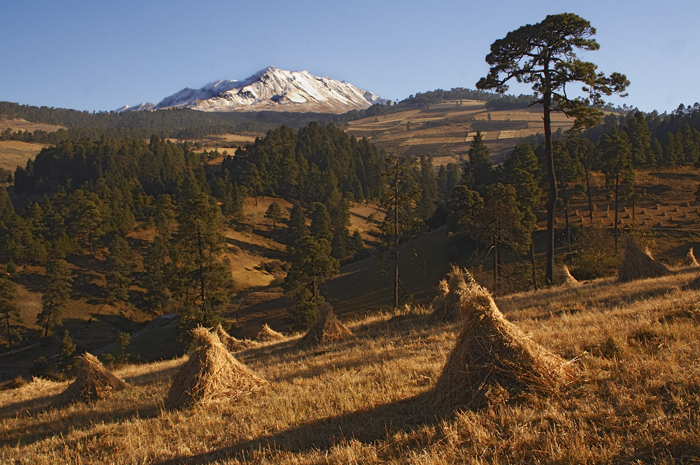
Nevado de Toluca is a stratovolcano in State of Mexico.

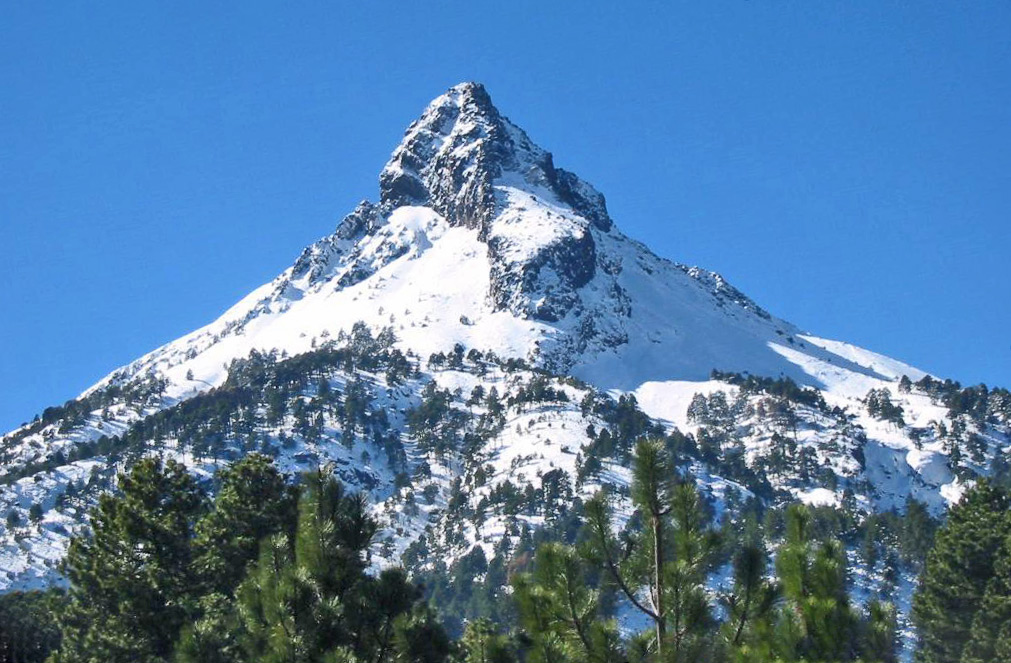
Nevado de Colima is an stratovolcano in Jalisco near the border with Colima.

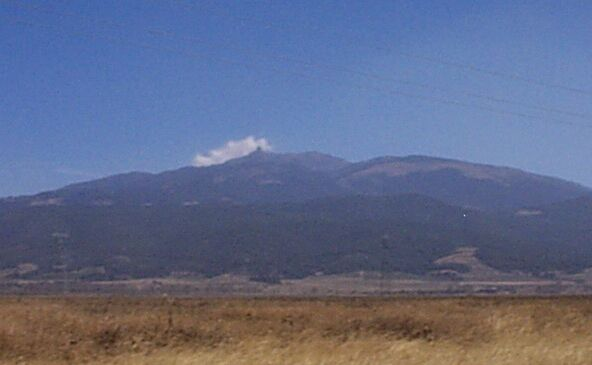
Cofre de Perote is a shield volcano in Veracruz.

== See also ==
- List of mountain peaks of North America
  - List of mountain peaks of Greenland
  - List of mountain peaks of Canada
  - List of mountain peaks of the Rocky Mountains
  - List of mountain peaks of the United States
  - List of mountain peaks of Mexico
    - List of the ultra-prominent summits of Mexico
    - List of extreme summits of Mexico
  - List of mountain peaks of Central America
  - List of mountain peaks of the Caribbean
- Mexico
  - Geography of Mexico
    - Category:Mountains of Mexico
      - commons:Category:Mountains of Mexico
- Physical geography
  - Topography
    - Topographic elevation
    - Topographic prominence
    - Topographic isolation
