= Rivera triple junction =

Place where the North American plate, the Rivera plate, and the Pacific plate meet

The Rivera triple junction (RTJ) is a geologic triple junction located on the seafloor of the Pacific Ocean southeast of the southern tip of the Baja California peninsula. At the RTJ, three tectonic plates intersect: the North American plate, the Rivera plate, and the Pacific plate. The triple junction is often referenced as the southern counterpart of the Mendocino triple junction, but it is not as well understood. One research effort describes it as an R-R-R (ridge-ridge-ridge) type junction which lies along the segment of the East Pacific Rise which runs between the Rivera Transform Fault and the Tamayo Fault, although the third axis of the junction is not clearly defined. Part of the problem in describing the Rivera triple junction is that if it were truly analogous to the Mendocino triple junction, then it would exist at the junction of the East Pacific Rise, the Tamayo Fault, and the Middle America Trench. But thus far, there does not appear to be any evidence that the Tamayo Fault or the East Pacific Rise intersect the Middle America Trench at all, thus presenting a possible example of a diffuse triple junction.
