= La Malinche National Park =

National park of Mexico

Coordinates: 19°14′14.11″N 98°2′36.12″W

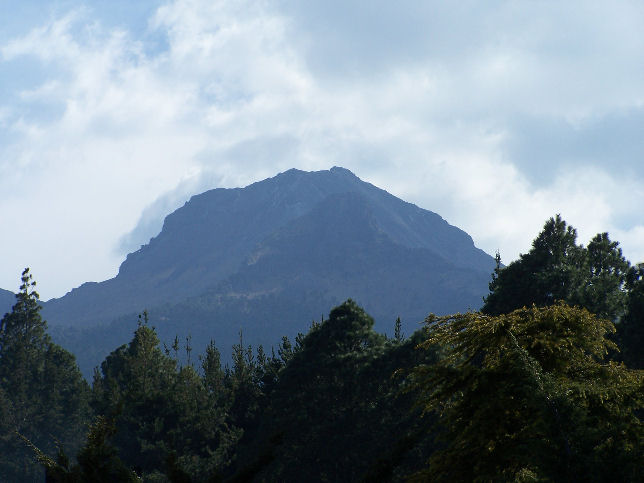
La Malinche—Matlalcueitl volcano in the park.

La Malinche National Park is located in the states of Tlaxcala in Central Mexico. The park is east of Mexico City, and about 44 kilometres (27 mi) from the capital city of Tlaxcala, Tlaxcala.

== Volcano ==
The La Malinche—Matlalcueitl volcano, part of the Trans-Mexican Volcanic Belt, is within the park. The volcano has an elevation of 4,462 metres (14,639 ft) above sea level. It is frequently used by mountaineers for training and altitude acclimatization before climbing the higher volcanos in the region.

The volcano's slope is gentle, and its vicinity to Mexico City makes it a popular weekend destination. A paved road reaches the top of the volcano. The "Centro Vacacional IMSS La Malintzi" on the volcano has 40 cabins, a camping area and some recreational facilities.

== See also ==
- List of national parks of Mexico
- List of volcanoes in Mexico
