= Delfin Basin =

Coordinates: 29.754°N 113.708°W

The Delfin Basin (delfín is Spanish for "dolphin") is a pair of interconnected submarine depressions located on the seabed of the northern Gulf of California. The northernmost of these is called the Upper Delfin Basin while the southernmost is called the Lower Delfin Basin. Both of these features are areas of subsidence caused by extensional forces imparted by a spreading center associated with the East Pacific Rise. The two basins are linked by a short transform fault which was the apparent source of an earthquake of magnitude 5.5 on November 26, 1997.

The Delfin Basin is linked to the Guaymas Basin located about 325 km to the south by a series of four transform faults called the Guaymas Transform Fault System. It is also linked to the north with the Consag Basin by way of a poorly defined deformation zone.

== See also ==
- Gulf of California Rift Zone
