= Propagating rift =

Seafloor geological feature

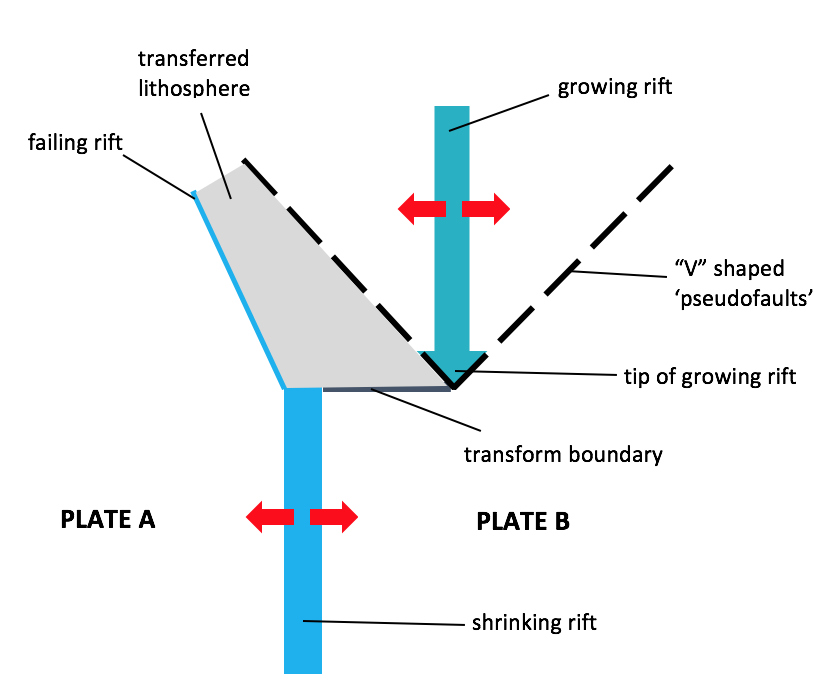
Graphical geometry of a propagating rift. Red arrow indicates spreading direction.

A propagating rift is a seafloor feature associated with spreading centers at mid-ocean ridges and back-arc basins. They are more commonly observed on faster rate spreading centers (50 mm/year or more). These features are formed by the lengthening of one spreading segment at the expense of an offset neighboring spreading segment. Hence, these are remnant features produced by migration of the tip of a spreading center. In other words, as the tip of a spreading center migrates or grows, the plate itself grows at the expense of the shrinking plate, transferring lithosphere from the shrinking plate to the growing plate.

== Terminology ==
Many other terms that have been used interchangeably with "propagating rift", including propagating ridges, ridge relocation, migrating ridges, propagators, rise jumps and ridge jumps. While they all refer to the same features, "ridge jumps" and "rise jumps" are sometimes used to refer to discontinuous or discrete propagations of a spreading center, which are most commonly observed at slow-spreading ridges as heat required to cause ridge jumps increases with spreading rate and age of seafloor.

== Formation ==
Propagating rifts are formed as a result of a change in plate motions, incremental jumps of the tip of a spreading center across a transform fault or, in most cases, from the migration of overlapping spreading centers (OSCs) along the crest of a mid-ocean ridge. The mechanism for propagation has been attributed to a few different hypotheses:

1. The hypothesis of fracture mechanics describes that a high concentration of stress at the tip of a ridge can cause progressive failure of the lithosphere, allowing cracks to propagate. Excess gravitational stresses due to these shallow ridges can further enhance the growth of ridges as the primary driving mechanism. In other words, ridge segment propagation rate is proportional to the axial crustal thickness. Thicker oceanic crust can cause higher gravitational stress, hence higher driving force of propagation.
2. When there is a significant bathymetric gradient, the associated gravitational gradient can be an important mechanism. Altimetry data depicts the proportionality between bathymetric gradient and propagation rate. Spreading centers with an axial high tend to have higher propagation rates due to less lithospheric resistance from younger, weaker lithosphere. Altimetry data also demonstrates the potential correlation between bathymetric gradient and direction of propagation.
3. Ridge-hotspot interaction causes weakening of lithosphere allowing new rifts to form as magma upwells.
4. In terms of crack length, rift tips with longer cracks possess a higher propagation driving force due to stronger far-field extensional forces, which leads to the idea that longer segments always grow at the expense of shorter segments.
5. In the case of spreading ridges in the back-arc basin, propagation has been thought to be controlled by the volcanic arc. Rifts seem to propagate towards the direction of volcanic arc.

== Identification ==
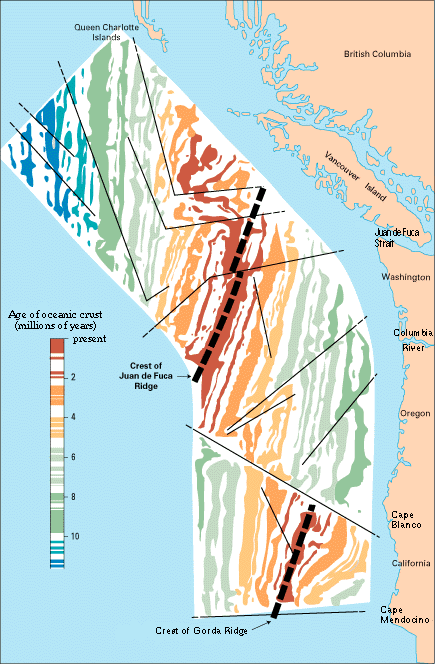
Magnetic anomalies (color) off west coast of North America. Dashed lines are spreading centers. Thin cross lines mark pseudo faults, which are features created by propagating rifts.

V-shaped patterns of oblique 'pseudofaults' on both side of the growing ridges are a distinct feature of propagating rifts. This seafloor feature, left in the wake of the segment migration, appears to be offset by an apparent fault in the oceanic crust. However, the offsets are only superficial seafloor features rather than true fault zones; hence the term 'pseudofaults'. In some circumstances when the spreading rate is low, morphological depressions can be observed along the 'pseudofaults' and shear zones, creating a distinct a bathymetric signature of propagating rifts. Besides that, formation of "V" shape 'pseudofaults' also leads to the "V" patterns of magnetic anomaly and age discontinuities across the seafloor.

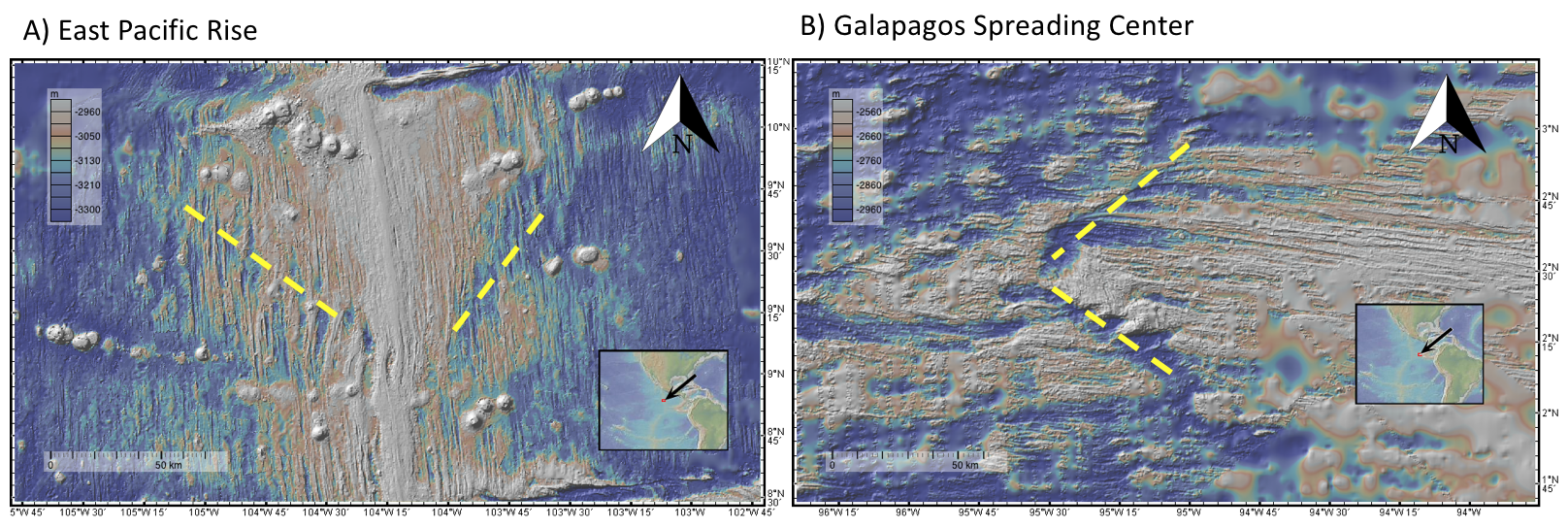
Bathymetric signatures of propagating rifts observed at the East Pacific Rise and Galapagos Spreading Center. Yellow-dashed lines indicate morphological depressions created in the wake of propagating rifts.

== Geometry models ==
Two sets of geometry had been used to describe the types of propagating rifts:

The first set is based on the morphology of the growing segment of propagating rifts. Under this geometry model, two types of propagating rifts were described: (1) median valley ridge propagation and (2) axial high ridge propagation. The difference in morphology of the growing rifts is a result of difference in propagating rate. Propagating rifts with a propagating rate that is approximately 25% of the spreading rate would have a "median valley" morphology at its growing segment which is dominated by a relative low along the axis of the ridge. On the other hand, propagating rifts with a propagating rate that is >50% of the spreading rate would have an "axial high" morphology, dominated by a relative high, pronounced ridge axis.

The second geometry set is based on the propagation style of the rifts. Under this geometry model, three types of propagating rifts were described: (1) discontinuous, (2) continuous and (3) broad transform-zone. "Discontinuous" is used to describe propagating rifts with discrete propagation motion (or ridge jumps). "Continuous" is used to describe propagating rifts with steady propagation. "Broad transform-zone" is used to describe propagating rifts with broad shear zone instead of a transform fault as boundary with the neighboring spreading segment.

== Hotspot-ridge interaction as a mechanism of propagating rifts ==
Hotspot-ridge interaction is one of the mechanisms of propagating rifts. Some of the interactions that can lead to ridge relocation includes lithospheric tension and thermal thinning, as well as magma penetration caused by hot convecting magma beneath the lithosphere, which further leads to the weakening of lithosphere. Hotspot ridge interactions can be observed in two ways: interactions between propagating rifts and a fixed hotspot or a migrating hotspot.

1. Interaction with a fixed hotspot is described as fixed hotspot magma penetration. Under this scenario, off-axis lithosphere is weakened by a hotspot near a spreading ridge. Upwelling of magma at the weakened off-axis lithosphere causes development of divergence. Dominance of upwelling at the new rift causes sharp decrease in spreading rate of the old spreading axis and sharp increase in spreading rate of the new rift. As the old spreading center ceases, the new rift forms the new spreading center.
2. Interaction with a migrating hotspot is described as a migrating hotspot intrusion zone. Under this scenario, a hotspot (with high heating rate) nearing a spreading center causes asymmetrical lithospheric thinning over a broad region, which further leads to formation of new rifts. Upwelling of hot mantle at the new rifts causes ridge jump. After ridge jump, the new spreading center and hotspot migrate together. Depending on how fast the hotspot and spreading center migrate, the hotspot would eventually be separated from the spreading center. Impact of ridge jump is proportional to the heating rate of hotspot.

== Discovery of propagating rifts ==
They were first noted in the 1970s on the Juan De Fuca ridge (spreading center) off northwestern North America where marine magnetic anomalies created during seafloor spreading show offsets not parallel to plate motion directions indicated by the trends of transform faults. They were soon found in other locations including the Galapagos Spreading Center and East Pacific Rise, and are now known to be ubiquitous on fast and intermediate spreading rate ridges.

== See also ==
- East Pacific Rise – Mid-oceanic ridge at a divergent tectonic plate boundary on the floor of the Pacific Ocean
- Pacific Plate – Oceanic tectonic plate under the Pacific Ocean
