= Matlalcueitl =

Matlalcueitl may refer to:

- Matlalcueitl (Mesoamerican deity), or Chalchiuhtlicue, in Tlaxcalan mythology
- Matlalcueitl (volcano), or Malinche, in Mexico
