= RTJ =

RTJ may refer to:

- Rivera triple junction, on the Pacific seafloor
- Rodrigues triple junction, in the southern Indian Ocean
- Robert Trent Jones Golf Club, Gainesville, Virginia, US
- Run the Jewels, a US musical duo
