= Rivera plate =

Small tectonic plate off the west coast of Mexico

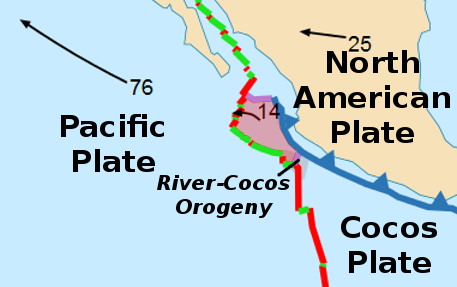
- Type: Minor
- Approximate area: 730,000 km^{2} (280,000 sq mi)
- Movement^{1}: South-East
- Speed^{1}: 14mm/year
- Features: Pacific plate
- ^{1}Relative to the African plate

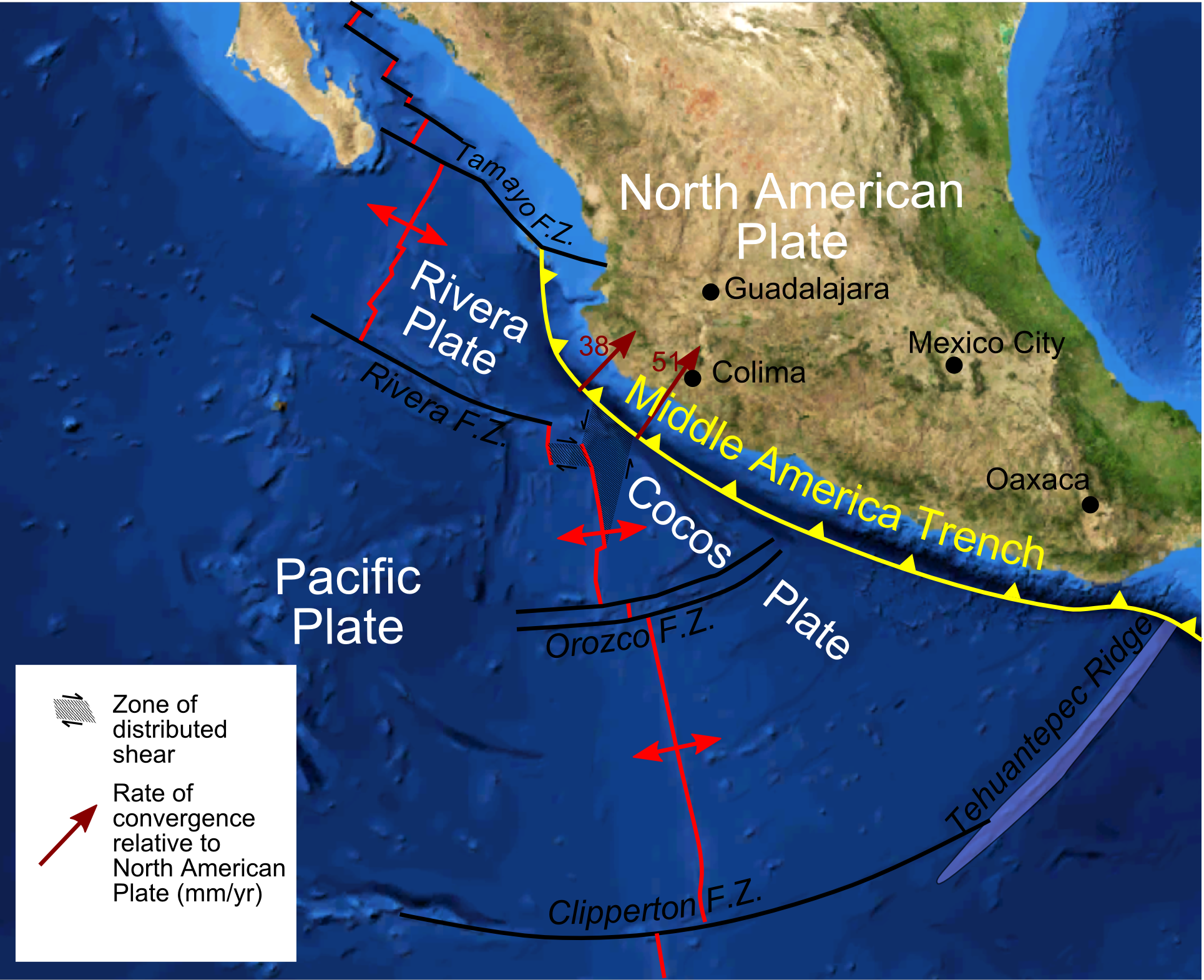
Plate boundaries in the Pacific, offshore western Mexico

The Rivera plate is a small tectonic plate (a microplate) located off the west coast of Mexico, just south of the Baja California peninsula. It is bounded on the northwest by the East Pacific Rise, on the southwest by the Rivera Transform Fault, on the southeast by a deformation zone, and on the northeast by the Middle America Trench and another deformation zone.

The Rivera plate is believed to have separated from the Cocos plate located to its southeast about 5–10 million years ago. Seismicity and tomography images show that the Rivera plate dips at 40° beneath the forearc region and then dips ~70° beneath the Trans-Mexican Volcanic Belt. The subduction of the Rivera plate under the North American plate, in the Mid-American Trench, has been the cause of the strongest earthquakes in the history of Mexico, including the largest earthquake in Mexico during the 20th century which occurred on June 3, 1932 in the state of Jalisco. The quake had a magnitude of 8.2 with a magnitude 7.8 aftershock, both of which caused widespread casualties and damage.

On October 9, 1995, a magnitude 7.6 earthquake occurred beneath the Jalisco region and caused significant loss of life and property.

A 7.8 magnitude earthquake occurred on January 24, 2003, near Colima in Mexico.

== See also ==
- Farallon plate – Ancient oceanic plate that has mostly subducted under the North American plate
- Juan de Fuca plate – Small tectonic plate in the eastern North Pacific
- Rivera triple junction – Place where the North American plate, the Rivera plate, and the Pacific plate meet
