= Pescadero Basin =

Marine depression in the Gulf of California

Location of the Pescadero Basin in the Gulf of California.

The Pescadero Basin is a submarine depression located on the seabed at the southern end of the Gulf of California off the coast of the Mexican state of Sinaloa. The basin results from the activity of one of the several spreading centers in the Gulf. The basin is linked to the Pescadero Fault to the south, and the Atl Fault in the north, two of the transform faults of the Gulf of California Rift Zone, i. e. the northern extension of the eastern Pacific Ridge.

Studies released around 2015 have revealed that the Pescadero Basin is a hydrothermal field rich in particular in carbonate chimneys, the only ones so far discovered in the Pacific Ocean, and thus in the typical living species that inhabit these environments.
