= Guaymas Fault =

Geological feature in Mexico

The Guaymas Fault, named for the city of Guaymas, Sonora, Mexico, is a major right lateral-moving transform fault which runs along the seabed of the Gulf of California. It is an integral part of the Gulf of California Rift Zone, the northern extremity of the East Pacific Rise. The Guaymas Fault runs from the San Pedro Martir Basin located at the southern end of the San Lorenzo Fault (the next transform to the north), and extends southward to the Guaymas Basin, a heavily sedimented rift which includes both continental and oceanic crust and contains numerous hydrothermal vents.

The Guaymas Fault is often grouped together with the three transform faults to its north as the Guaymas Transform Fault System. These faults are, from north to south, the Ballenas, Partida, San Lorenzo, and Guaymas. This system of fault extends some 325 km, linking the Delfin Basin in the north with the Guaymas Basin in the south.
