= Farallon Fault =

Fault on the Gulf of California seafloor

The Farallon Fault is a right lateral-moving transform fault located on the seafloor of the southern Gulf of California. It links the Carmen Basin to the north with the Farallon Basin to the south. All these features are part of the Gulf of California Rift Zone, the northern extension of the East Pacific Rise.
