= Alarcon Basin =

Submarine depression in Mexico

The Alarcon Basin is a submarine depression located on the seabed at the southern end of the Gulf of California. The basin results from the activity of the southernmost spreading center in the Gulf. This spreading center has also produced the southernmost oceanic rift in the Gulf of California Rift Zone, the Alarcon Rise. The basin and rise are linked to the Tamayo Fault to the south, and the Pescadero Fault in the north.
