= Ballenas Fault =

- Location: Gulf of California

Characteristics
- Part of: East Pacific Rise

Tectonics
- Status: active
- Earthquakes: 2009 Gulf of California earthquake
- Type: transform

The Ballenas Fault is a transform fault located on the seabed of the Gulf of California, extending through the Canal de Ballenas which separates the Isla Ángel de la Guarda from the Baja California peninsula. The fault is an integral part of the East Pacific Rise, linking the Delfin Basin in the north with a smaller spreading center to the south. The fault is considered the northernmost member of a grouping of four transform faults called the Guaymas Transform Fault System.

The Ballenas Fault produced a magnitude 6.9 earthquake on August 3, 2009.
