= Farallon Basin =

Submarine depression on the Gulf of California seafloor

The Farallon Basin is a submarine depression located on the seabed at the southern end of the Gulf of California. The basin results from the activity of one of the several spreading centers in the Gulf. The basin is linked to the Atl Fault to the south, and the Farallon Fault in the north.

The Farallon Basin has a spreading axis at its center, so the seafloor here is oceanic crust, transitioning into thin, rifted continental crust at the basin's edges. Spreading centers in the Gulf, like this one in Farallon, are different from more well known spreading axes like the Mid-Atlantic Ridge and East Pacific Rise, since they form as deep rift valleys rather than bathymetric highs.

One familiar source of terrigenous input to the Gulf is the Colorado River, which empties into the northern Gulf (though no longer consistently, as a result of overuse for irrigation). Further south, especially in the eastern Gulf, the Sierra Madre Occidental are a more important source of sediment.
