= Lamont seamount chain =

Pacific seamount chain

- Location within Pacific Ocean

Location
- Coordinates: 10°00′N 104°30′W

Lamont seamount chain is a chain of submarine mountains in the eastern Pacific Ocean which are named "Sasha", "MIB", "MOK", "DTD" and "NEW". They are located close to the East Pacific Rise and reach a minimum depth of 1,629 metres (5,344 ft).

These seamounts are submarine volcanoes of Pleistocene to Holocene age that are usually capped off by summit calderas and craters. They have erupted lava flows of tholeiitic composition; the last eruption may have occurred less than 8,000 years ago.

== Geography and geomorphology ==
The Lamont seamount chain is a group of five seamounts in the Pacific Ocean; from southeast to northwest they are known as "Sasha", "MIB", "MOK", "DTD" and "NEW" and there is an additional unnamed seamount southwest from "NEW". The seamounts were discovered in 1983 and named later. An unrelated set of seamounts in the western Pacific has also been referred to as the "Lamont seamounts"; some references to the biology of the Lamont seamounts may apply to the west Pacific ones. Brisingid echinoderms have been observed on the seamounts.

The seamounts reach heights of 1–1.4 kilometres (0.62–0.87 mi) and have summit craters/calderas, that on "DTD", "MOK" and "NEW" form nested, complex calderas. Horseshoe-shaped volcanic ridges accompany the calderas and lava effusion appears to have preferentially occurred on the margins of the calderas, along with mass wasting. The Lamont seamount chain forms a 50 kilometres (31 mi) long chain and the individual seamounts surrounded by lava cones 140–100 metres (460–330 ft) high. The shallowest part of the chain is on one of the western seamounts and lies at 1,629 metres (5,344 ft) depth while Sasha reaches to 1,890 metres (6,200 ft), "MIB" to 1,630 metres (5,350 ft) depth, "MOK" to 1,640 metres (5,380 ft) and "NEW" to 1,670 metres (5,480 ft); in general the seamounts shallow westward and their outline changes from conical to more elongated. East of the Lamont seamounts is a nascent volcano.

== Geology ==
While the Clipperton fracture zone is located just north, the East Pacific Rise lies east of the seamounts; Sasha Seamount lies just 8 kilometres (5.0 mi) from the Rise. It appears to contain a magma chamber at that latitude and seems to have produced voluminous volcanism that generated a topographic elevation that is now associated with the Lamont seamounts. The volcanism is quite young and accompanied by hydrothermal activity; seafloor spreading here proceeds at a rate of 11 centimetres per year (4.3 in/year) and a volcanic eruption in 2003–2006.

The seamounts have produced hyaloclastites, sheet- and lobe-like lava flows as well as pillow lavas and talus. The total volume of each seamount ranges between 140–20 cubic kilometres (33.6–4.8 cu mi) and the volume increases away from the East Pacific Rise, which along with other patterns indicates a progressive development of the seamount as they move away from the East Pacific Rise. They appear to have been formed under the influence both of fracture zones and of a melt anomaly that also formed a 200–400 metres (660–1,310 ft) topographic anomaly west of the Lamont seamount chain along with elongated volcanic structures; a bathymetric swell is also noted around the seamounts as well as a 150 metres (490 ft) deep depression that may be an isostatic moat. Two magma chambers have been identified between Sasha and the EPR. The volcanism may be ultimately the consequence of hotspot activity.

=== Composition ===
The Lamont seamount chain has erupted tholeiitic magmas which contain olivine and plagioclase phenocrysts as well as spinel but little clinopyroxene. All samples taken from the seamounts contain sulfide globules, including cubanite and pyrrhotite. In some samples, carbonates, celadonite, iron hydroxides, manganese crusts and mica are found. They are relatively primitive magmas that were not stored over long timespans in the crust and undergo simple fractional crystallization processes; their sources appear to be distinct from the magma sources of the East Pacific Rise.

== Geochronology ==
The Lamont seamounts probably formed within the last 400,000 years. While the ages of the seamounts are not known, they are by necessity younger than the underlying 740,000 – 100,000 years old seafloor; the lack of sediment cover and thick ferromanganese deposits as well as the youthful appearance of lava flows also speaks for a young age although there is no evidence of hydrothermal activity, past or present. The reflectance of the seafloorm has been used to infer increasing ages from 33,000 years at Sasha to 230,000 at "MOK". Radiocarbon dating of foraminifera encased in lava flows of "NEW" seamount has yielded an age of 18,540 ± 216 radiocarbon years ago, indicating recent activity; additionally, a sample from Sasha seamount may be less than 8,000 years old on the basis of a radium-thorium isotope disequilibrium.
