= Consag Basin =

The Consag Basin is a submarine depression in the far northern part of the Gulf of California associated with the East Pacific Rise. It lies south of the Wagner Basin with which it is closely linked. The depression is a result of subsidence caused by the extensional forces probably imparted by the same spreading center which has produced the Wagner Basin. Both basins are bounded on their eastern side by the Wagner Fault, a primarily normal (vertical motion) fault which dips approximately 60 degrees to the northwest. The western side of the basin is bounded by another normal fault, the Consag Fault which dips in a direction opposite the Wagner Fault. The seabed between these faults is sinking.

The Consag Basin is linked to the Delfin Basin located to its south by a poorly understood deformation zone which further research may eventually define as a transform fault.

The basin is named for a rocky outcrop in its vicinity, the Roca Consag.
