= Trans-Mexican Volcanic Belt =

Active volcanic belt that covers central-southern Mexico

- Stratigraphic range: Neogene to Quaternary
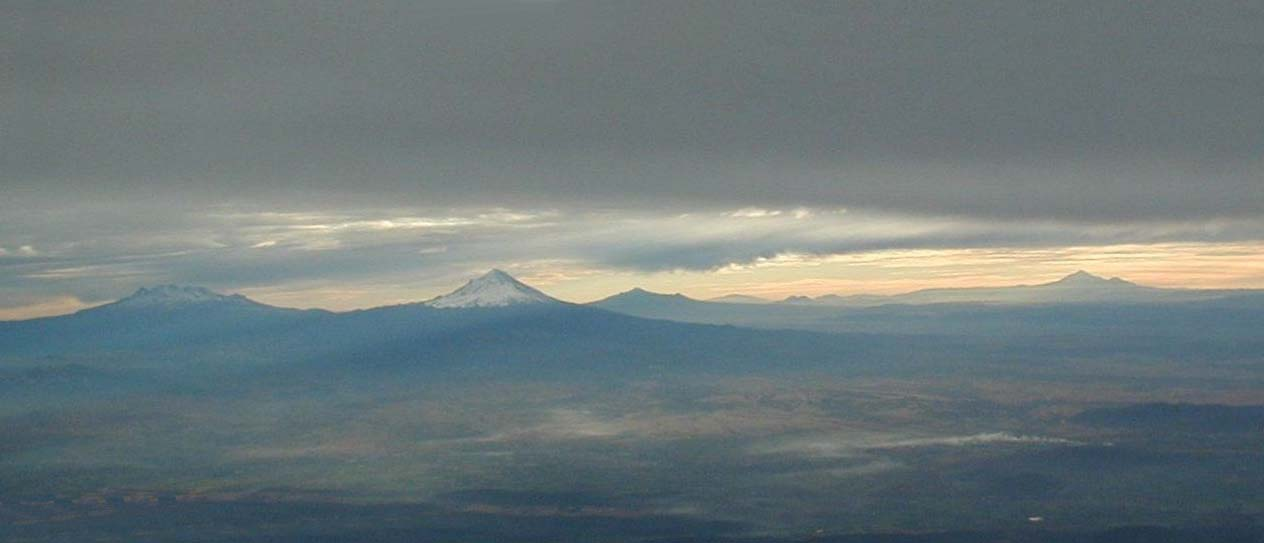
- Six Mexican Volcanoes; Left to right Iztaccíhuatl, Popocatépetl, Matlalcueitl (Malinche), Nauhcampatépetl (Cofre de Perote, most distant), Citlaltépetl (Pico de Orizaba), Sierra Negra
- Type: Volcanic arc
- Overlies: Sierra Madre Occidental
- Area: 160,000 km^{2} (62,000 sq mi)
- Thickness: East of 101°W 50-55 km, west of 101°W 35-40 km

Location
- Coordinates: 19.03°N 97.27°W.
- Region: Central Mexico
- Country: Mexico
- Extent: 1,000 km^{2} (390 sq mi)
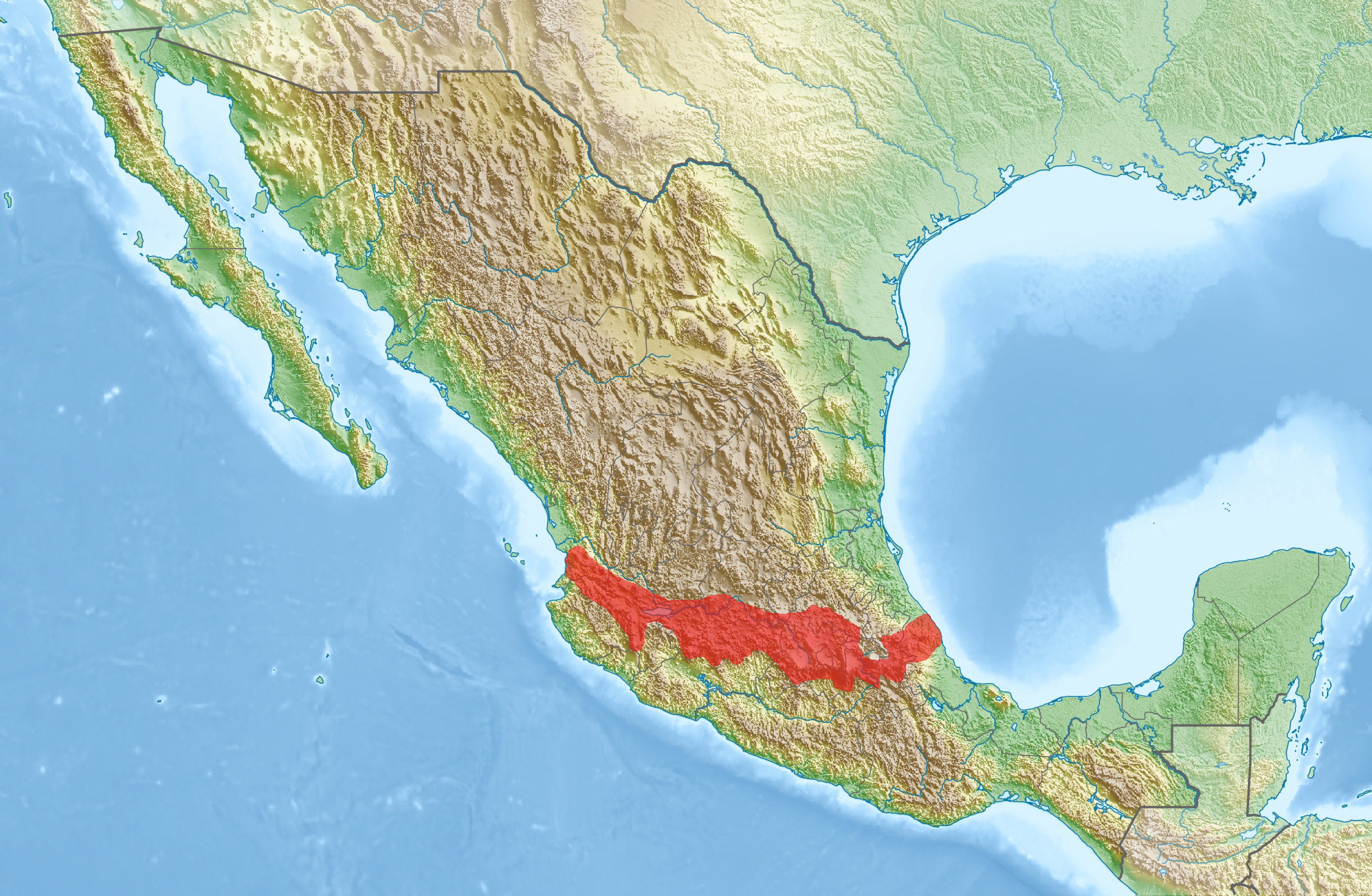

View of the Trans-Mexican Volcanic Belt in Veracruz

The Trans-Mexican Volcanic Belt (Spanish: Eje Volcánico Transversal), also known as the Transvolcanic Belt and locally as the Sierra Nevada (Snowy Mountain Range), is an active volcanic belt that covers central-southern Mexico. Several of its highest peaks have snow all year long, and during clear weather, they are visible to a large percentage of those who live on the many high plateaus from which these volcanoes rise.

== History ==
The Trans-Mexican Volcanic Belt spans across central-southern Mexico from the Pacific Ocean to the Gulf of Mexico between 18°30'N and 21°30'N, resting on the southern edge of the North American plate. This approximately 1000 kilometer long, 90–230 km broad structure is an east–west, active, continental volcanic arc; encompassing an area of approximately 160,000 km^{2}. Over several million years, the subduction of the Rivera and Cocos plates beneath the North American plate along the northern end of the Middle America Trench formed the Trans-Mexican Volcanic Belt. The Trans-Mexican Volcanic Belt is a unique volcanic belt; it is not parallel to the Middle American Trench, and many of the main stratovolcanoes are positioned obliquely to the general position of the arc. In addition to the physiographic complexities, igneous compositions vary—dominant subduction-related products contrast with intraplate geo-chemical signatures. The many intriguing aspects of the belt have spurred several hypotheses based on a typical subduction scenario: intra-plate leaky transform faults, mantle plumes, continental rifting, and jump of the eastward Pacific Rise. These features are partially related to the reactivation of early fault systems during the Trans-Mexican Volcanic Belt's evolution. The main brittle fault system's geometry, kinematics, and age define a complex array of what could be multiple factors affecting the deformation of the belt. It exhibits many volcanic features, not limited to large stratovolcanoes, including monogenetic volcano cones, shield volcanoes, lava dome complexes, and major calderas.

== Geologic framework ==
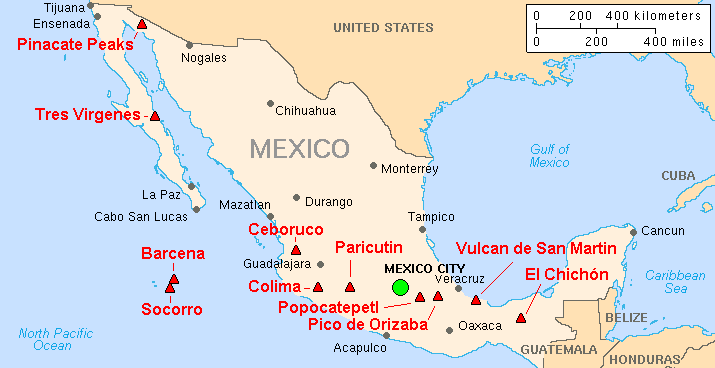
Major active volcanoes of Mexico. From west to east, volcanoes part of the Trans-Mexican Volcanic belt are Nevado de Colima, Parícutin, Popocatépetl, and Pico de Orizaba.

Prior to the formation of the Trans-Mexican Volcanic Belt, an older, but related volcanic belt, the Sierra Madre Occidental occupied the area. Resuming in the Eocene, post-Laramide deformation, subduction related volcanism formed the Sierra Madre Occidental silic volcanic arc at a paleo-subduction zone off the coast of Baja California, before the peninsula rifted away. From the Late Eocene to the Middle Miocene, counterclockwise rotation of the volcanic arc transitioned the once active Sierra Madre Occidental to a now active Trans-Mexican Volcanic Belt. By the Middle Miocene, the transition from the silicic to more mafic compositions was complete, and can be considered the beginning of the Trans-Mexican Volcanic Belt. Due to the orthogonal orientation of the Trans-Mexican Volcanic Belt in relation to the trend of Mexican tectonic provinces, its pre-Cretaceous basement is highly heterogeneous. The Trans-Mexican Volcanic Belt east of 101°W rests upon Precambrian terranes, assembled into the Oaxaquia microcontinent and on the Paleozoic Mixteco terrane. West of 101°W, the Trans-Mexican Volcanic Belt resides on top of the Guerro composite terrane—a make up of Jurassic to Cretaceous marine marginal arcs, which are built on Triassic–Early Jurassic siliclastic turbidites. Assemblage of these basement rocks results with a thickness of 50–55 km east of 101°W and 35–40 km west of 101°W.

== Plate evolution ==
The subducting plates originated from the breakup of the Farallon plate at approximately 23 Ma, which created two plates at equatorial latitudes, the Cocos Plate and southern Nazca plate. The Rivera Plate was the last fragment detached from the Cocos Plate, becoming a microplate at around 10 Ma. This small plate is bounded by the Rivera fracture zone, the East Pacific Rise, the Tamayo fracture zone, and the Middle American Trench. The larger Cocos Plate is bordered by the North American Plate (NAM) and the Caribbean plate to the northeast, the Pacific plate to the west, and to the south by the Nazca Plate. The Cocos and Rivera are relatively young oceanic plates (25 and 10 Ma) that are subducting along the Middle American Trench at different convergence rates (Rivera = ~30 mm/yr and the Cocos = ~ 50–90 mm/yr). Commonly found subduction related rocks such as calc-alkaline rocks volumetrically occupy a majority of the Trans-Mexican Volcanic Belt but smaller volumes of intraplate-like lavas, potassium rich rocks, and adakites are associated with the area. Middle Miocene adakitic (more felsic) rocks are found furthest from the trench and along the volcanic front of the central Trans-Mexican Volcanic Belt during the Pliocene-Quaternary. It has been suggested that slab melting contributed to the adakitic imprint on the Trans-Mexican Volcanic Belt, prompted by the prolonged flat subduction of the Cocos plate.

== Belt evolution ==
=== Formation ===
Volcanic Evolution and changes in composition over time. 1) Early to Late Miocene the belt the Cocos and Rivera plate begin subduction beneath Central Mexico. 2) Late Miocene to Early Pliocene the slab tear begins to propagate West to East across the back northern area of the belt, allowing Asthenospheric heat in to generate the Mafic episode. 3)Latest Miocene - Early Pliocene was the onset of more silic volcanics generated by Flat Slab Subduction which pushed the belt further inland to the north. 4)Late Pliocene to Holocene is characterized by slab rollback sending the volcanic arc trenchward to the present day position

1. From the early to mid Miocene ~20 to 8 Ma, the initial Trans-Mexican Volcanic Belt volcanic arc consisted of intermediate effusive volcanism, producing andesitic and dacitic polygenetic volcanoes extending from western Michoacan (longitude 102°W) to the Palma Sola area (longitude 98°30'). The plate boundary geometry and sub-horizontal subducting slab's thermal structure are the controlling factors for initial arc volcanism. Magmatism migrated away from the trench, moving northeast towards the Gulf of Mexico—giving the arc its characteristic E-W orientation, the inland push of the arc showed progressively drier melting, and eventually slab melting began to occur—suggesting flattening of the subducted slab. The oldest rocks of this age may be exposed near the modern volcanic front, in Central Mexico.
2. A Late Miocene ~11 Ma eastward traveling pulse of mafic volcanism swept across the whole of central Mexico, north of the previously formed arc, ending ~ 3 Ma. The onset of the mafic lavas indicates lateral propagation of slab tear, prompted by the end of subduction beneath Baja California, allowing the influx of asthenosphere into the mantle wedge. This volcanism created basaltic plateaus through fissures, or less commonly, small shield volcanoes and lava cones, with diminishing lava volume eastward.
3. West of 103°W, silicic volcanism between 7.5 and 3.0 Ma became bimodal (mafic-silicic) in the early Pliocene, creating large dome complexes and ignimbrites, and marked the beginning of trenchward migration of volcanism. East of 101°W dome complexes, lava flows, and large calderas that produced significant quantities of ignimbrites (>50 km^{3}) of dacitic to rhyolitic composition can be found dating between 7.5 and 6 Ma. There is an absence of silicic volcanism between these regions during the whole Trans-Mexican Volcanic Belt history. Since the late Miocene, silicic volcanism migrated trenchward over 200 km in the eastern sector (east of 101°W) and 100 km in the western sector (West of 103°W).
4. Since the late Pliocene, the style and composition of volcanism in the Trans-Mexican Volcanic Belt became more diverse. In several areas, volumetrically dominant calc-alkaline rocks are associated with modest volumes of intraplate-like lavas or other potassium rich rocks, accompanied by Quaternary rhyolitic peralkaline rocks. This modern arc consists of a frontal belt dominated by flux and slab melting and a rear belt characterized by the differentiated rocks stated previously. Absent since ~9 Ma, stratovolcanoes began to be created in the last 1 Ma ~100 km behind the volcanic front in the Western Sector, oriented West - Northwest and East - Southeast. In the eastern sector, all stratovolcanoes are found within the volcanic front. One exception to the location of these stratovolcanoes is the Colima volcanic complex, which is positioned south of the southern tip of the Cocos and Rivera slab tear and is the largest volcanic edifice in the Trans-Mexican Volcanic Belt. In addition to stratovolcanoes, monogenetic volcanic fields are also characteristic for this episode, the most prominent being the Michoacán–Guanajuato volcanic field.

=== Cause of flat slab subduction ===
Flat slab subduction can commonly be explained by oceanic plateau subduction and a fast overriding plate. Central Mexico's flat subduction is not evident. The Trans-Mexican Volcanic belt's flat slab is confined between ~101°W and 96°W; this region may be explained by thicker continental crust. Existence of thick strong crust combined with decreasing fluid input contributed to narrowing the asthenospheric wedge, increasing viscosity and suction forces, which led to flat subduction—preventing the oceanic plate from entering the mantle.

== Geography ==
=== Region ===
From the west, the Trans-Mexican Volcanic Belt runs from Colima and Jalisco east through northern Michoacán, southern Guanajuato, southern Querétaro, México State, southern Hidalgo, the Distrito Federal, northern Morelos, Puebla, and Tlaxcala, to central Veracruz.

The Mexican Plateau lies to the north, bounded by the Sierra Madre Occidental to the west and Sierra Madre Oriental to the east. The Cofre de Perote and Pico de Orizaba volcanoes, in Puebla and Veracruz, mark the meeting of the Trans-Mexican Volcanic Belt with the Sierra Madre Oriental. To the south, the basin of the Balsas River lies between the Trans-Mexican Volcanic Belt and the Sierra Madre del Sur. This area is also a distinct physiographic province of the larger Sierra Madre System physiographic division.

The Sierra de Ajusco-Chichinauhtzin also forms part of the Belt.

=== Peaks ===
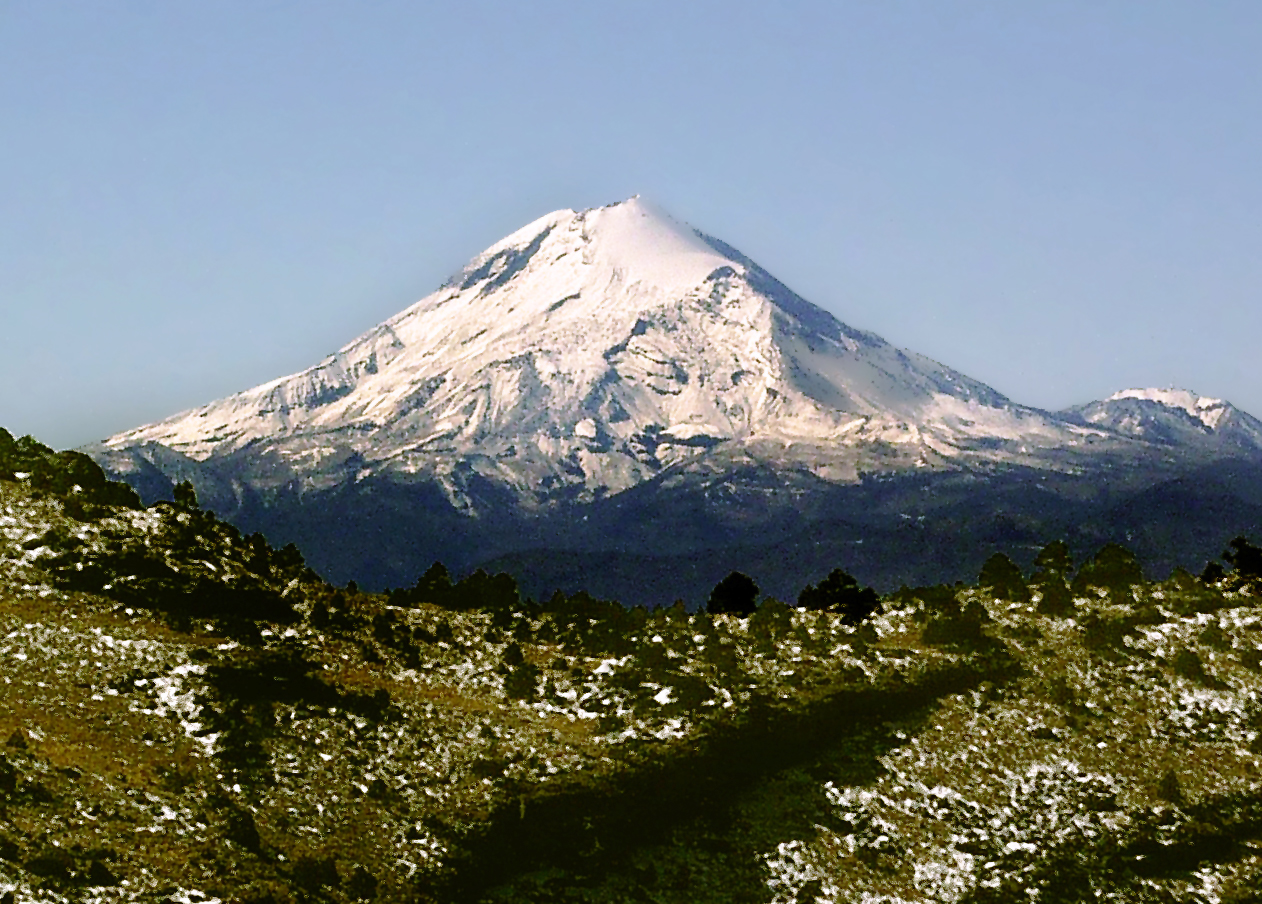
Pico de Orizaba

The highest point, also the highest point in Mexico, is Pico de Orizaba (5,636 metres (18,491 ft)), also known as Citlaltépetl, located at 19°01′N 97°16′W. This, and several of the other high peaks, are active or dormant volcanoes.

Other notable volcanoes in the range include (from west to east) Nevado de Colima (4,339 metres (14,236 ft)), Parícutin (2,774 m (9,101 ft)), Nevado de Toluca (4,577 m (15,016 ft)), Popocatépetl (5,452 m (17,887 ft)), Iztaccíhuatl (5,286 m (17,343 ft)), Matlalcueitl (4,461 m (14,636 ft)) Cofre de Perote (4,282 m (14,049 ft)) and Sierra Negra, a companion of the Pico de Orizaba (4,580 m (15,030 ft)).

== Ecology ==
The mountains are home to the Trans-Mexican Volcanic Belt pine-oak forests, one of the Mesoamerican pine-oak forests sub-ecoregions.

The Trans-Mexican Volcanic Belt has many endemic species, including the Transvolcanic jay (Aphelocoma ultramarina).

Volcanic ash make soils in the region very fertile, which (especially coupled with elevation making tropical climate milder) has led to high human population densities in the belt that now sometimes strain the environment.

== See also ==
- List of volcanoes in Mexico
- List of seismic faults in Mexico
- Legend of Popocatépetl and Iztaccíhuatl
