= Pescadero Fault =

The Pescadero Fault is a right lateral-moving transform fault located on the seafloor of the southern Gulf of California. It links the Pescadero Basin to the north with the Alarcon Basin to the south. All these features are part of the Gulf of California Rift Zone, the northern extension of the East Pacific Rise.
