= Oaxaca Fault =

Geologic feature in Oaxaca, Mexico

Oaxaca Fault (Spanish: Falla de Oaxaca) is a seismic fault that runs near Oaxaca city, Oaxaca, Mexico. It runs north on the east side of the city from Etla Valley. Donaji Fault is a nearby fault that runs roughly perpendicular to Oaxaca Fault at its southern end.
