= Tamayo Fault =

The Tamayo Fault is a major right lateral-moving transform fault located on the seabed at the mouth of the Gulf of California. The fault is the southernmost transform in the Gulf of California Rift Zone. The fault links the Rivera Ridge segment of the East Pacific Rise in the south with the Alarcon Basin in the north.
