= Overlapping spreading centers =

Feature of spreading centers at mid-ocean ridges

Schematic of oceanic overlapping spreading centers. Plates A and B are spreading apart. Black regions denote spreading centers.

Overlapping spreading centers are a feature of spreading centers at mid-ocean ridges.

== Appearance ==
In the normal case adjacent spreading centers not on the same trend, end at a transform fault that appears to offset each center. At an overlapping spreading center the adjacent centers overlap and are not connected by a transform fault. In plan view, overlapping spreading centers look like two people about to shake hands but over-reaching by a distance that is three times the distance between the hands. This 3:1 overlap to offset ratio (observed at a wide range of scales, from hundreds of meters to tens of km) holds the key to their mechanism of formation. In fracture mechanics, when two cracks propagate toward each other, they tend to deflect away from each other, propagate past each other, and then stall out when the ratio is 3:1 because at this point the crack propagation force drops to zero.

What results are two spreading centers overlapping, apparently pushing against each other, which would violate one of the rules of plate tectonics: plates are rigid. This paradox is solved by the fact that the overlapping spreading centers are non-steady-state and propagate along the ridge; as one segment lengthens, the neighboring segment shortens. Which segment lengthens, is arbitrary; evidence shows that at times the spreading center tips have alternated migrating directions. The discovery of overlapping spreading centers revealed the time-varying behavior of mid-ocean ridge segments, with implications for magmatism, volcanism and patterns of hydrothermal activity.

== Occurrence ==
Overlapping spreading centers are found mostly on mid-ocean ridge spreading centers in the Pacific Ocean basin where the rates of separation between the plates are higher than in other ocean basins. They occur on all fast-spreading rate centers (>90 mm/yr) including the East Pacific Rise, and on most intermediate-rate spreading centers (50–90 mm/yr), such as the Galapagos Spreading Center, the Juan de Fuca Ridge and the Pacific-Antarctic Ridge.
