= Carmen Basin =

Submarine depression in the Gulf of California

The Carmen Basin is a submarine depression located on the seabed at the southern end of the Gulf of California. The basin results from the activity of one of the several spreading centers in the Gulf. The basin is linked to the Farallon Fault to the south, and the Carmen Fault in the north.
