= Rivera Fracture Zone =

The Rivera Fracture Zone (historically referred to as the Rivera Transform Fault) is a complex tectonic boundary on the seafloor of the Pacific Ocean off the west coast of Mexico, south of the mouth of the Gulf of California. It lies between segments of the East Pacific Rise and forms part of the boundary region associated with the Rivera Plate. The feature is interpreted as a complex and segmented structure and an accommodation or diffuse deformation zone between spreading systems, rather than a classic transform fault. There is also uncertainty regarding the degree to which the Rivera Plate behaves as a distinct rigid tectonic plate relative to adjacent plates.
