= Guaymas Basin =

Rift basin in the Gulf of California

Location of the Guaymas Basin in the Gulf of California.

The Guaymas Basin is the largest marginal rift basin located in the Gulf of California. It made up of the northern and southern trough and is linked to the Guaymas Fault to the north and the Carmen Fault to the south. The mid-ocean ridge system is responsible for the creation of the Guaymas Basin and giving it many features such as hydrothermal circulation and hydrocarbon seeps. Hydrothermal circulation is a significant process in the Guaymas Basin because it recycles energy and nutrients which are instrumental in sustaining the basin's rich ecosystem. Additionally, hydrocarbons and other organic matter are needed to feed a variety of organisms, many of which have adapted to tolerate the basin's high temperatures.

== Formation ==
The formation and characteristics of the Guaymas basin are caused by its location on a mid-ocean ridge system, or a range of underwater volcanoes which occur along divergent plate boundaries. As tectonic plates spread apart, magma flows and hardens on the sea floor, creating a new igneous crust. Meanwhile, sediments from the ocean rapidly deposit on top of the crust, building a thick sill cover. The magma spurs hydrothermal flow which creates thermal and chemical gradients. These gradients lead to dynamic biogeochemical environments, which include features such as high heat flow, hydrothermal plumes, and hydrocarbon seeps, that contribute to the type of ecosystem which thrives in the Guaymas basin.

== Hydrothermal Circulation ==
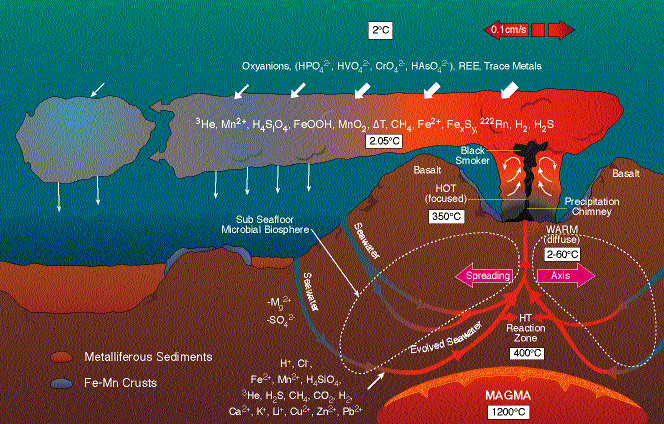
Hydrothermal vent diagram

Hydrothermal circulation, or the circulation of hot water, is a predominant feature of the Guaymas Basin. Hydrothermalism is mainly observed in the southern trough of the basin where hydrothermal vents make up a hydrothermal complex on the seafloor by creating mounds, chimney structures, and sediments. Hydrothermal circulation happens when water flows downward through broken ocean crust along the volcanic mid-ocean ridge system. After being heated, the water chemically reacts with the host sill. The temperature of the water can rise above 400 °C. At this temperature, the water will rise quickly back to the seafloor due to its decrease in density. This circulation of water is crucial to the cycling of energy and nutrients between the ocean crust and the ocean.

== Ecosystem ==
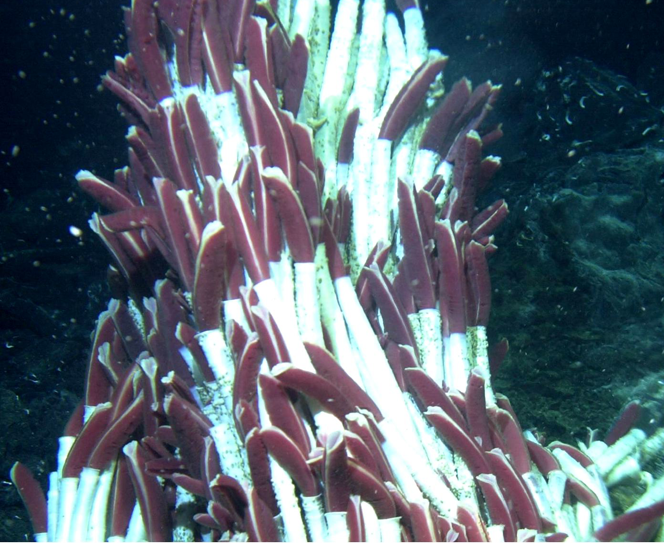
Riftia tubeworms

Especially in the southern trough, the Guaymas Basin supports a unique ecosystem. Heterotrophs consume organic matter rained down from the productive surface waters, while chemolithoautotrophs degrade hydrocarbons and oxidize sulfur in the hydrothermal fluid (often cycling these compounds with syntrophic partners). Of note are the colonies of Riftia tubeworms, Beggiatoa and other microbial mats, and thermophilic microbes that can withstand hydrothermal temperatures.
