= Malinche (volcano) =

Volcano located in the states of Tlaxcala and Puebla in Mexico

La Malinche
- Matlalcueye
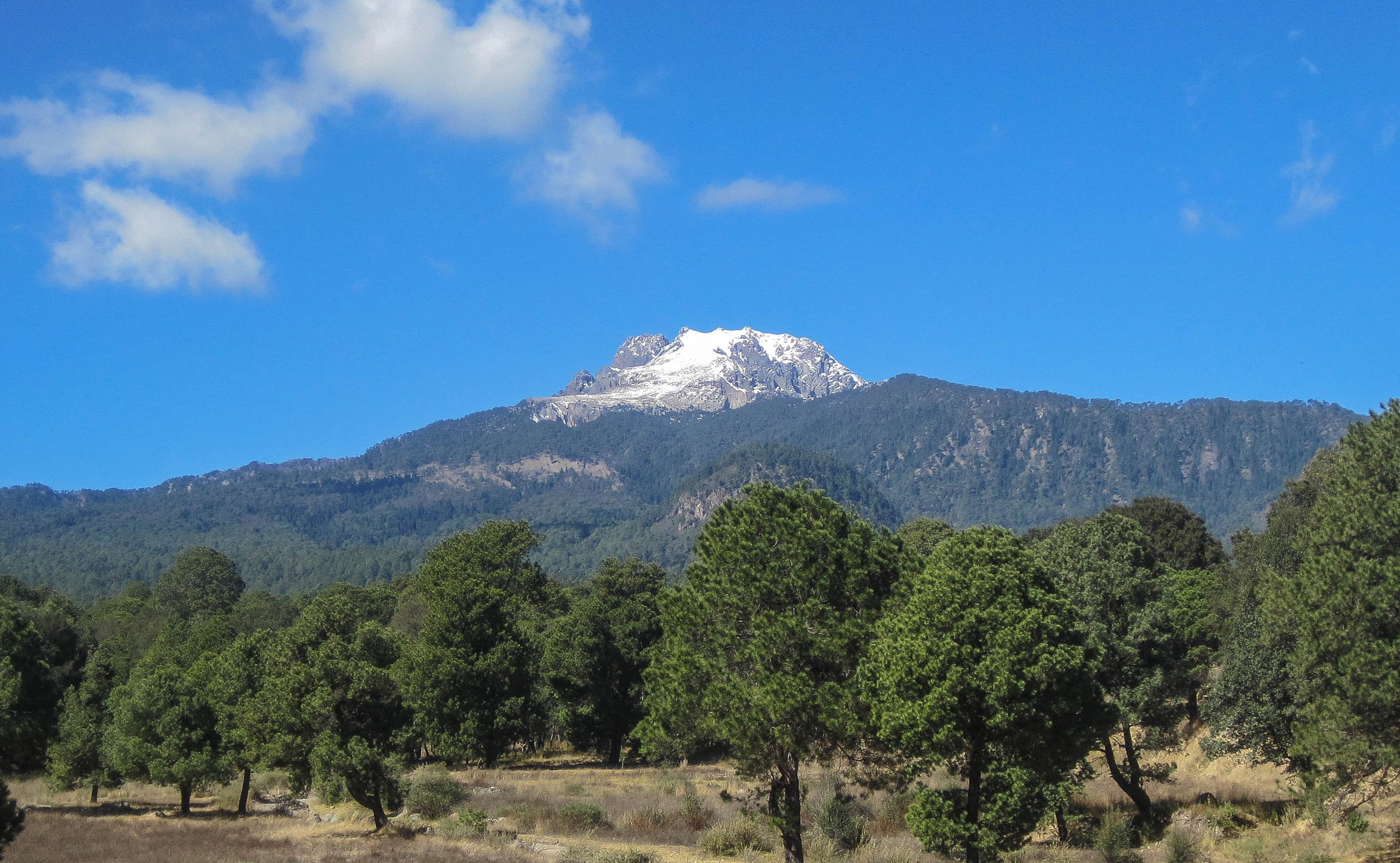

Highest point
- Elevation: 4,461 m (14,636 ft)
- Prominence: 1,920 m (6,300 ft)
- Listing: North America highest 23rd; Mexico highest major peaks 5th; Mexico prominent peaks 10th
- Coordinates: 19°13′51″N 98°01′55″W

Geography
- Location within Tlaxcala Location within Puebla (state) Location within Mexico
- Location: Tlaxcala / Puebla, Mexico
- Parent range: Cordillera Anahuac

Geology
- Mountain type: stratovolcano
- Volcanic belt: Trans-Mexican Volcanic Belt
- Last eruption: 1170 BCE ± 50 years

Climbing
- Easiest route: hiking trail

La Malinche, also known as Matlalcueye or Malintzin, is an inactive volcano (dormant for the last 3,100 years) located in the states of Tlaxcala and Puebla in Mexico. Officially, its summit reaches 4,461 metres (14,636 ft) above sea level, though it is generally considered to be closer to 4,440 metres (14,567 ft), using GPS measurements. It is the highest peak in Tlaxcala, the fifth-highest in Puebla, the sixth-highest in Mexico, the 23rd-highest in North America, and the 252nd-highest in the world. Its height above nearby cities varies from 1,908 metres (6,260 ft) above Huamantla, 2,461 metres (8,074 ft) above Villa Vicente Guerrero, 2,221 metres (7,287 ft) above Tlaxcala, to 2,299 metres (7,543 ft) above Puebla. The summit is 22.4 kilometres (13.9 mi) from Tlaxcala, 28.3 kilometres (17.6 mi) from Puebla, and 118 kilometres (73 mi) from Mexico City. The climate is cold near the summit and mild on the lower slopes.

The Tlaxcaltecs named the peak Matlalcueitl, which translates to "[Lady of the] Blue Skirt", a goddess of rain and song, believed to be the local equivalent of Chalchiuhtlicue. The Spanish named it simply Sierra de Tlaxcala ("Tlaxcalan Range"). The current name, Malinche or Malintzin, became popular during the 17th century, and honors the woman who helped Hernán Cortés as an interpreter during the conquest of the Aztec Empire.

== Location ==
Located within the Parque Nacional La Malinche at the border of Tlaxcala and Puebla states, this volcano is part of the Trans-Mexican Volcanic Belt. The park is the fifth largest of the 85 peaks in México. It covers an area of 458.52 square kilometres (177.04 sq mi), of which roughly two thirds belong to Tlaxcala and one third to Puebla. The diameter of the park is approximately 24 kilometres (15 mi).

== Formation ==
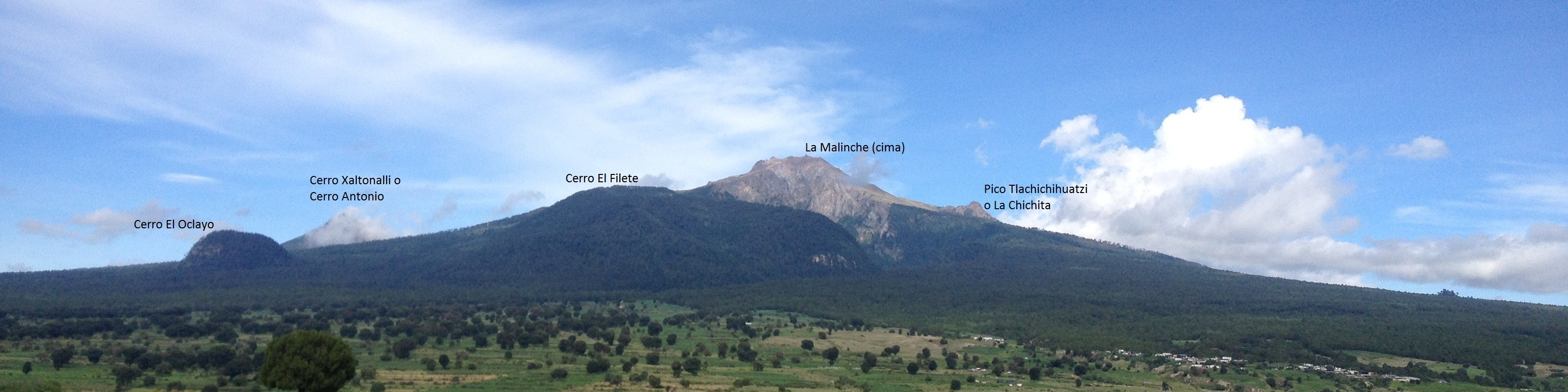
La Malinche and its side peaks

La Malinche is an active stratovolcano which began to form in the middle of the Paleogene period, 30–35 million years ago. Since that time it has grown through eruptions, the last of which is believed to have occurred ca. 3,100 years ago. It is not a typical volcanic cone, but instead has a number of side peaks like Tlachichihuatzi or La Chichita (4,100 metres (13,500 ft)), Xaltonalli (3,890 metres (12,760 ft)) and Chicomecanoa (3,650 metres (11,980 ft)); as well as two of the most dramatically steep slopes in Mexico: Barranca Axaltzintle to the northeast (which is believed to be the former crater) and Barranca Axal to the south-southeast. La Malinche is mostly isolated from the surrounding ranges; some nearby mountains and hills are El Pinal (3,280 metres (10,760 ft)), El Tintero (2,920 metres (9,580 ft)), Cuatlapanga (2,900 metres (9,500 ft)), Huintitépetl (2,890 metres (9,480 ft)) and Xalapasco (2,750 metres (9,020 ft)).

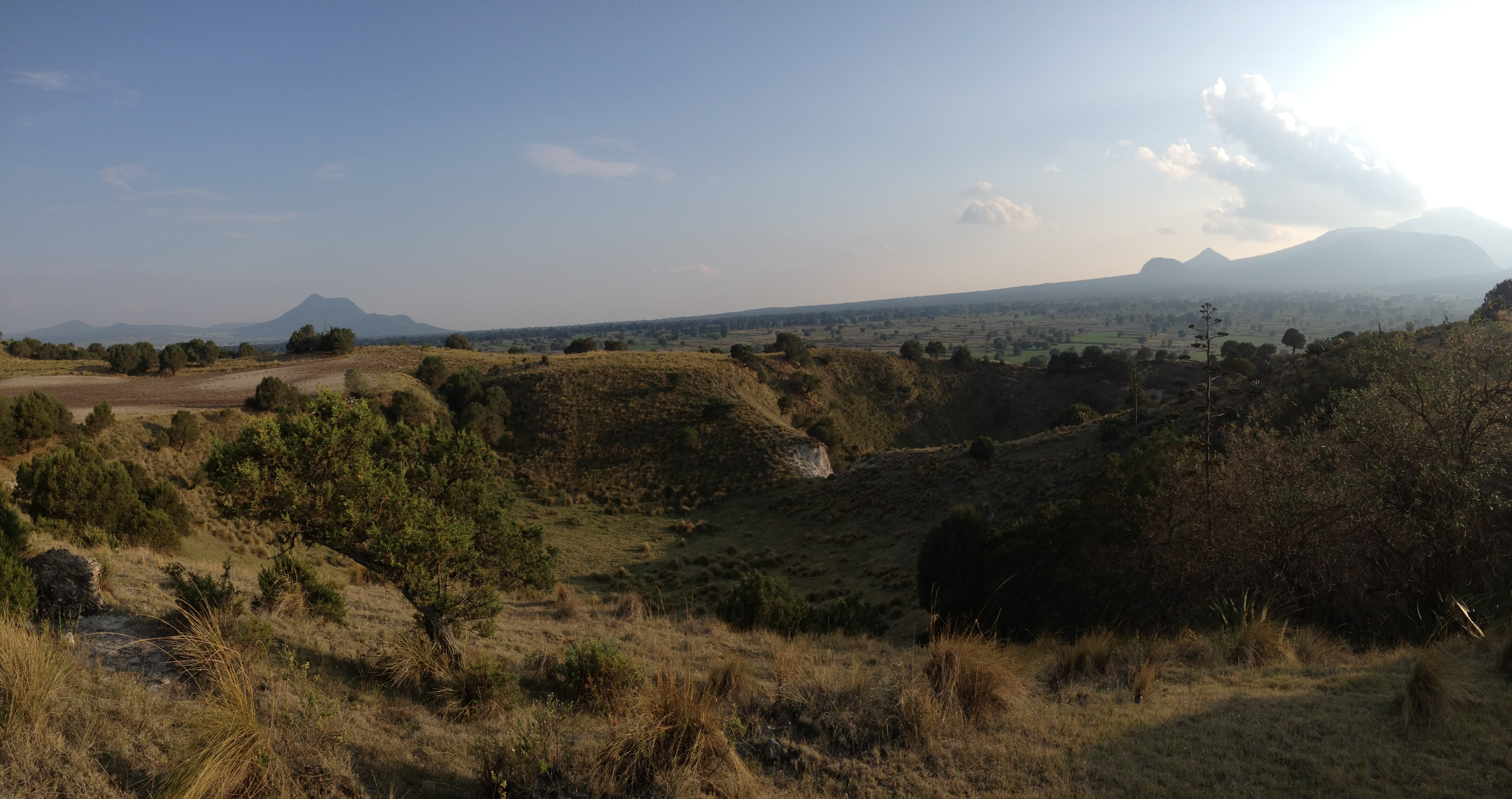
View from nearby Xalapasco hill. La Malinche on the far right, with side peaks El Filete, Xaltonalli and Oclayo next to it; on the other end, El Tintero and El Pinal.

On lower slopes are farmlands which grow mostly field "dent" corn and forests which transition from alders and various types of oak to Montezuma pines and sacred firs with increasing elevation. The upper slopes are zacatonal. The summit is covered by snow part of the year and is considered to be the coldest location in Tlaxcala. On the lower slopes the climate is mild year round, but rainy during the summer months. The soils consist of crushed volcanic rock and sand with an underlying layer of clay and sand called tepetate at an average depth of about a meter. The dark and porous forest soils were formed from volcanic ash. From La Malinche streams flow in all directions forming small gorges in places which fill and run rapidly when torrential rains occur. At the base of the mountain emerge many springs, some of drinkable water, and others of thermal water heated in the volcano's interior.

== Legends ==
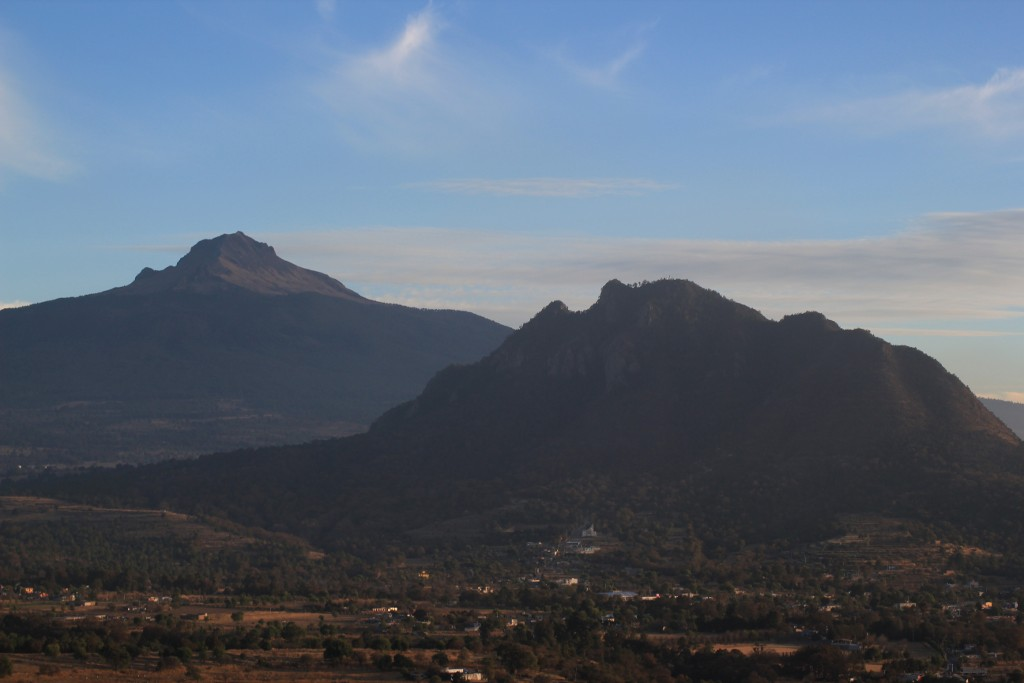
Cuatlapanga, with La Malinche in the back

La Malinche shares, like Popocatépetl and Iztaccíhuatl, legends about its formation. According to the most famous legend, Matlalcueye was a virgin girl engaged to Cuatlapanga, a warrior who had to go to battle in a remote place. Time went by, and the lover took so long to come back that the girl died of sorrow. When the warrior came back, badly hurt on the head, he received the bad news. He went to cry at her grave and also died, turning into a small mountain. Matlalcueye turned into the huge volcano, with the smaller Cuatlapanga at her side.

Another legend about the mountain concerns a reptilian monster that supposedly lived in the mountain and that would come down during the rainy season to abduct children and take them up the mountain to be devoured. Eventually the beast was killed, according to legend, and its head was mounted above the entrance to a house in Puebla that still stands at 201 East Third Street in the historical district of that town.

== Recreation ==
The park offers a resort area at 3,080 metres (10,105 ft)—"Centro Vacacional Malintzin"—with cabins and camping. It is an ideal location to acclimatize and start an ascent of the volcano. There are sporting facilities, a restaurant and a gift shop. Outside the resort, there is also a convenience store and a little "antojitos" restaurant, as well as horses and llamas for riding on the weekends. The access road passes the resort area and continues partway up the mountain, switchbacking most of the way. A hiking trail to the summit begins at the resort area, cutting across the road switchbacks for the first section. The trail then leads into a conifer section at around 3,400 metres (11,155 ft). The tree line, from where the "false" summit is visible for the first time, is at 3,900 metres (12,795 ft). After that, a very steep grassland section begins. The ridge starts at 4,200 metres (13,780 ft) and leads to the summit, which is just behind the false summit. The last 100-or-so metres involve a bit of scrambling.

It is often cold and very windy above the tree line, so proper clothing is recommended. Crampons and an ice axe are absolutely necessary whenever it has snowed recently – which typically happens a few times each year from December to March. Other than that, the ascent is challenging but not technical. Fit hikers can reach the summit from the resort area in 3–4 hours, but it is best to plan for 5–6 hours with breaks. It is best to start in the early morning and return well before sunset. The alpine police will warn hikers against ascending above the tree line after 2 p.m.

There are other more demanding routes starting from the surrounding towns of Huamantla, Ixtenco, San Juan Tepulco and San Miguel Canoa. On September 14, 1968, a group of mountain climbers mainly consisting of employees of the Autonomous University of Puebla was lynched in San Miguel Canoa, after they planned on staying in town overnight because of the adverse weather. The conservative town priest had encouraged the town population to the killing, mistaking the climbers for Communist students. The massacre was later adapted to film by director Felipe Cazals.

== See also ==
- List of mountain peaks of North America
- List of mountain peaks of Mexico
- List of volcanoes in Mexico
- List of Ultras of Mexico

== Sources ==
- Acuña, René (1984). Relaciones geográficas del siglo XVI: Tlaxcala. Mexico City: National Autonomous University of Mexico. ISBN 9685805903
- Bowles, David (2012). Mexican Bestiary. Donna, TX: VAO Publishing. ISBN 978-0615571195.
- Castro-Govea, R.; et al. (2001). Recent Eruptive History of La Malinche Volcano, Mexico: Towards the Construction of a Hazards Map. Eos Transactions, AGU, 82(47), Fall Meeting Supplement, Abstract V42C-1030.
- Neyra Jáuregui, Jorge A. (2012). Guía de las altas montañas de México y una de Guatemala. Mexico City: CONABIO. ISBN 9786077607601.
