= East Pacific Rise =

Ridge on the floor of the Pacific Ocean

Approximate surface projection on Pacific Ocean of East Pacific Rise (purple). In some usage this continues as the Pacific-Antarctic Ridge (violet). Features associated with fracture zones (orange) are also shown (lighter orange). Click to expand map to obtain interactive fracture zone details.

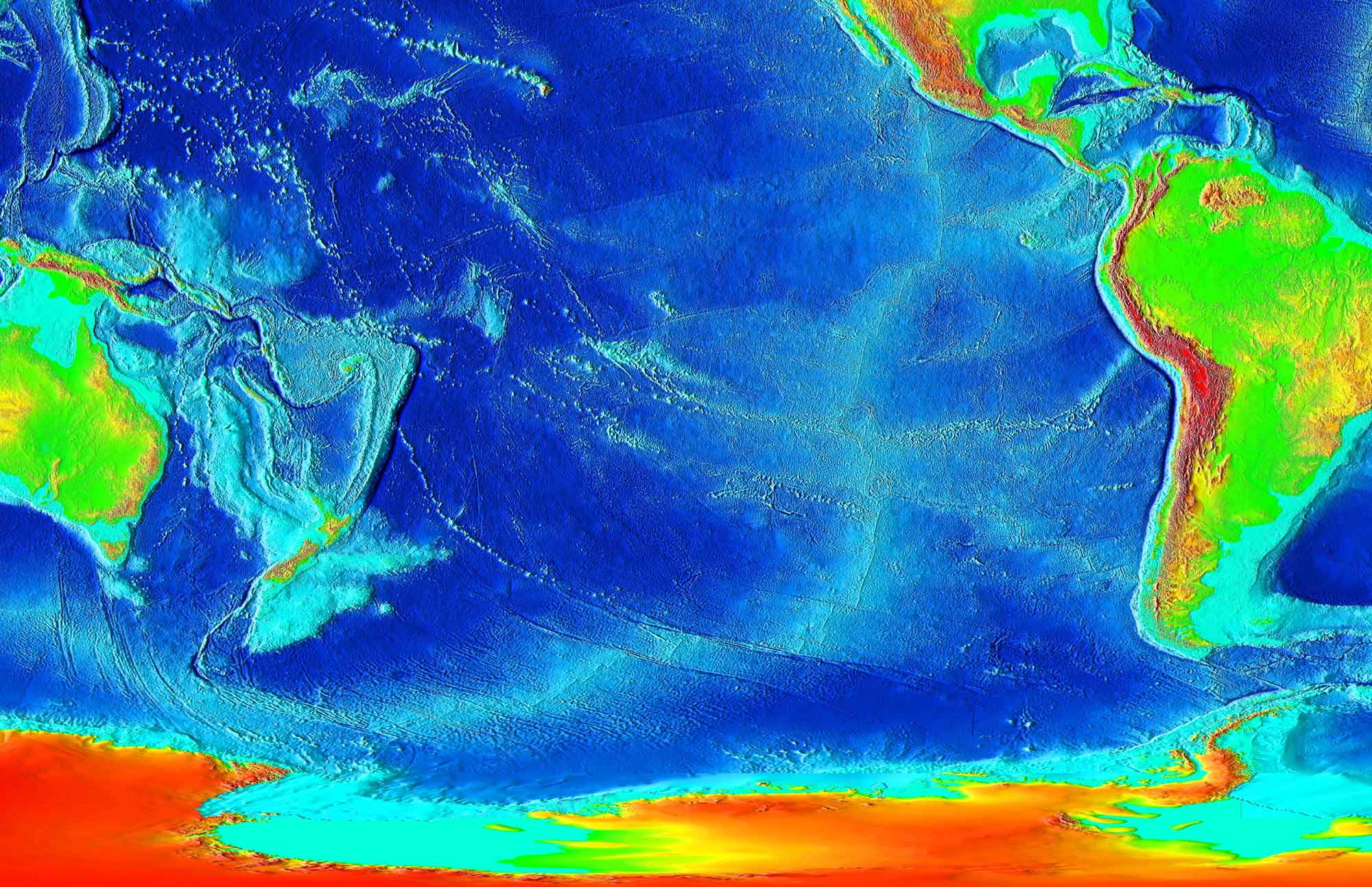
Relief map with the East Pacific Rise (shown in light blue), extending south from the Gulf of California

The East Pacific Rise (EPR) is a mid-ocean rise at a divergent tectonic plate boundary, located along the floor of the Pacific Ocean. It is usually termed an oceanic rise and not a mid-ocean ridge due to its higher rate of spreading, which results in less elevation increase and more regular terrain. Spreading rates vary along the East Pacific Rise, ranging from superfast in the south (>130-150 mm/yr), to fast in the north (90-130 mm/yr). The EPR separates the Pacific plate to the west from the North American plate, the Rivera plate, the Cocos plate, the Nazca plate, and the Antarctic plate (listed from north to south). It runs south from the Gulf of California in the Salton Sea basin in Southern California to a point near 55°S 130°W, where it joins the Pacific-Antarctic Ridge (PAR) trending west-south-west towards Antarctica, near New Zealand (though in some uses the PAR is regarded as the southern section of the EPR). Much of the rise lies about 3,200 km (2,000 mi) off the South American coast and reaches a height about 1,800–2,700 m (5,900–8,900 ft) above the surrounding seafloor. The EPR is a region of active, effusive volcanism. As a result of this subterranean heat, hydrothermal activity in the EPR provides the temperatures, nutrients, and protection that many species of thermophilic organisms need to survive.

== Overview ==
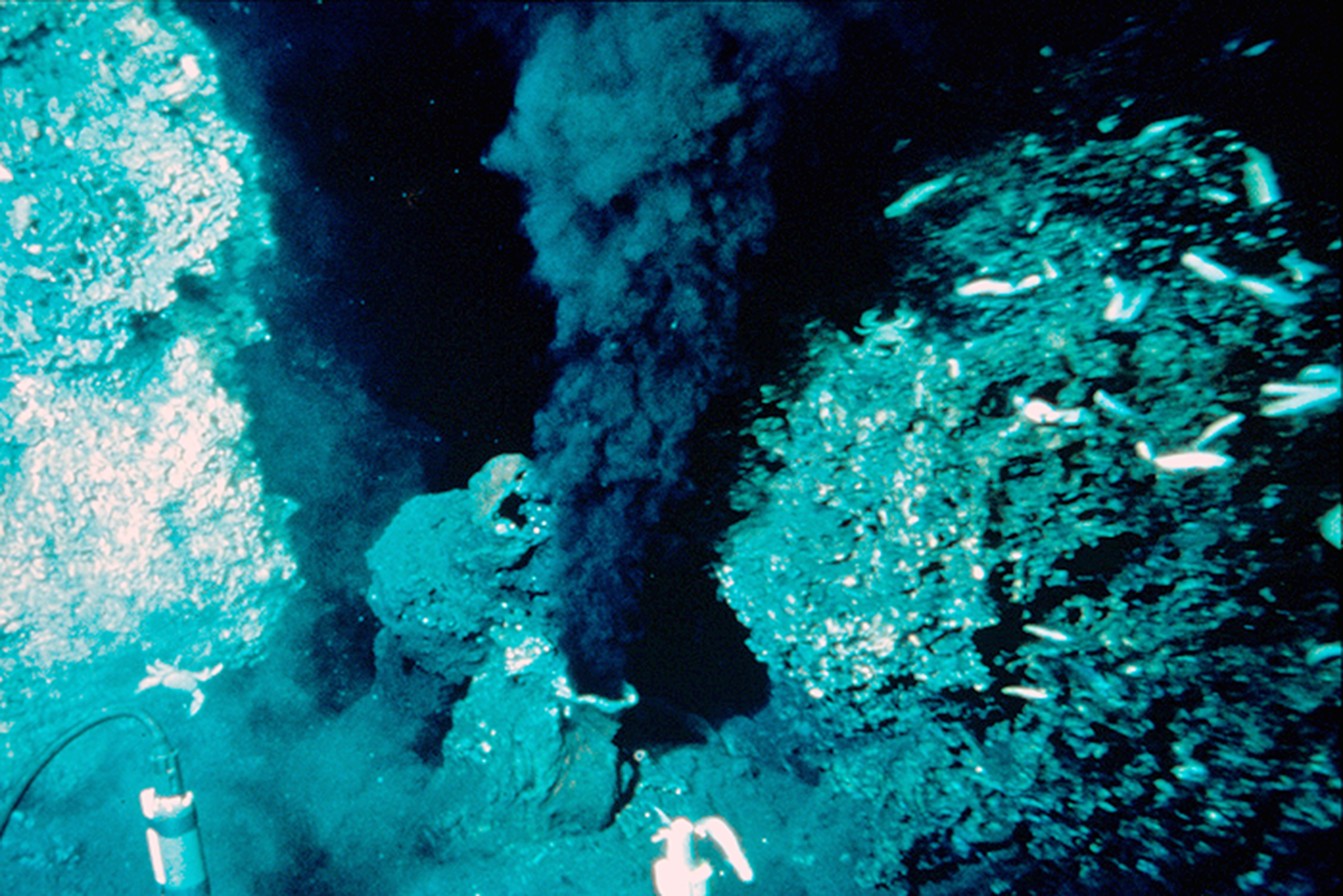
East Pacific Rise, 21 degrees north. Base of "black smoker" chimney

The oceanic crust is moving away from the East Pacific Rise to either side. Near Easter Island the rate is over 150 mm (6 in) per year which is the fastest in the world. However, on the northern end, it is much slower at only roughly 60 mm (2 1/2 in) per year. On the eastern side of the rise, the eastward-moving Cocos and Nazca plates meet the westward moving South American plate and the North American plate and are being subducted under them. The belt of volcanos along the Andes and the arc of volcanoes through Central America and Mexico are the direct results of this collision. Due east of the Baja California peninsula, the Rise is sometimes referred to as the Gulf of California Rift Zone. In this area, newly formed oceanic crust is intermingled with rifted continental crust originating from the North American plate.

Near Easter Island, the East Pacific Rise meets the Chile Rise at the Easter Island and Juan Fernandez microplates, trending off to the east where it subducts under the South American plate at the Peru–Chile Trench along the coast of southern Chile. This portion of the Rise has been referred to as the Cape Adare-Easter Island Ridge, Albatross Cordillera, Easter Island Cordillera, Easter Island Rise, and Easter Island Swell.

Parts of the East Pacific Rise have oblique spreading, such as the Nazca–Pacific plate boundary between 29°S and 32°S. This is seafloor spreading that is not orthogonal to the nearest ridge segment.

The southern extension of the East Pacific Rise (the PAR) merges with the Southeast Indian Ridge at the Macquarie triple junction south of New Zealand. The southern stretch of the East Pacific Rise is also one of the fastest-spreading divergent boundaries on Earth, peaking at 79.3 mm (3.12 in)/year.

Along the East Pacific Rise the hydrothermal vents called black smokers were first discovered by the RISE project in 1979, and have since been extensively studied. These vents are forming volcanogenic massive sulfide ore deposits on the ocean floor. Many unique deep-water creatures have been found with vents, that subsist in a chemosynthetic ecosystem rather than one using photosynthesis.

== Geologic History ==
The history of the East Pacific Rise is closely related to the evolution of the ancient Farallon plate and the ensuing plate reorganizations of the eastern Pacific plate system. Evidence of these reorganizations comes from the topography of the Pacific ocean and magnetic lineations across the seafloor. There is evidence of several ancient spreading centers and fracture zones caused by these reorganizations, which allow us to constrain the locations of the ancient plates.

Around 30 million years ago, there was a collision between the Pacific–Farallon spreading ridge and the North American margin. This caused a major reorganization of the northeastern Pacific plate system, and the Farallon plate began to fragment. Around 25 million years ago, this reorganization and fragmentation resulted in the formation of the Guadalupe plate, an ancient microplate bounded by the Murray fracture zone to its north and the Cocos-Nazca spreading ridge to its south.

Around 23 million years ago, the ancient Farallon plate subducted under the North American plate faster than it could regenerate, which caused the Farallon plate to break into two smaller plates, or the Nazca and Cocos plates. This was likely driven by the divergence of slab-pull stresses at the subduction zones in Middle America and South America.

Another reorganization occurred between 12.5 and 11 million years ago, which resulted in the reduction in size of the Nazca-Cocos plate boundary. This ridge was originally located over the Mathematicians seamounts. At this same time, the Pacific-Guadalupe spreading center likely died out between latitudes of 29°30′N to 23°30′N. The Farallon plate continued to fragment between 6.5 and 3.5 million years ago, and the plates reorganized, leaving behind extinct seafloor spreading centers like the Mathematician Ridge. A major reorganization occurred around 2.5 million years ago, where the Pacific-Cocos spreading center moved north towards the Rivera fracture zone.

Together, these events contributed to the development of a new crustal accretion center between the Pacific, Nazca, and Cocos plates, which became the modern East Pacific Rise. The EPR remains an active divergent plate boundary to this day.

== Ridge Structure ==
The East Pacific Rise is considered a fast to very-fast spreading mid-ocean ridge, meaning it has a smooth, broad, symmetric axial high, rather than the deep, wide, asymmetric central rift valley typically seen in slow-spreading mid-ocean ridges. The northern EPR, or the boundary between the Pacific and Cocos plates, is considered a fast-spreading ridge, and it has had a full rate of spreading of around ~110 mm/yr for the past 2 million years. The southern EPR, or the boundary between the Pacific and Nazca plates, is considered a superfast spreading ridge, meaning that it spreads with a full rate of >130-150 mm/yr. The fastest rates of spreading are between the Easter Microplate and the Garrett Transform, where there is a full spreading rate between 150-155 mm/yr.

There two stable triple junctions across the EPR, which are the Galápagos triple junction and the Chile triple junction. The Galápagos triple junction is a ridge-ridge-ridge junction where the Pacific, Nazca, and Cocos plates meet, while the Chile triple junction is a ridge-trench-trench junction where the South American, Nazca, and Antarctic plates meet.

Differences in topography across mid-ocean ridges are caused by variations in magma supply, spreading rates, and the structure of the lithosphere. Most the interactions that cause these differences in ridge morphology occur close to the ridge axis, and for most of the EPR, this is associated with a narrow axial summit trough (AST). An axial summit trough is a narrow and linear depression that is seen along the crest of fast and superfast spreading ridges. The EPR's AST ranges from 5 to 10 m in depth and has a width of up to 200 m.

=== Ridge Discontinuities ===
Between 8°-10°N of the EPR there are four orders of ridge discontinuities visible, which includes transform faults (first order), overlapping spreading centers (second order), small offset tectonic discontinuities (third order), and eruptive fissure zones (fourth order). The discontinuities seen in the AST are almost consistent with the discontinuities in the ridge crest, which could reflect similar discontinuities in the magmatic system beneath the EPR.

The two major transform faults seen in this region are the Clipperton and Siqueiros transform faults. The Clipperton transform fault is a ~85 km long dextral (right-lateral) fault located around 10°15′N. It is the only unsegmented transform fault across the EPR, and it has been in the same configuration for around 9 million years. The Siqueiros transform fault is a ~140 km long sinistral (left-lateral) fault located around 8°24′N. It is segmented and has a ~11.25 km wide trench.

There is one major overlapping spreading center (OSC) between 8°-10°N of the EPR, which is located at 9°03′N. Overlapping spreading centers are marked by neo-volcanic zones where two curving ridge segments enclose a long, narrow depression. In these systems, the length of the central depression is usually equal to or greater than the distance offsetting the two segments. For the OSC at 9°03′N, its two limbs are offset by 8 km and overlapped by 27 km.

There are at least 10 small offset tectonic discontinuities between 8°-10°N of the EPR with lengths of around 30-100 km and offsets of around 0.5-1.0 km. These formations persist for hundreds of thousands of years and are composed of basaltic lava at the center and pillow lava at the edges. They all have a common underlying magma system. The 6 eruptive fissure zones found in this region are observed within the small offset tectonic discontinuities, and they have offsets between 50 and 500 m and lifetimes of several hundred to a few thousand years.

== Magmatism and Volcanic Activity ==
Magmatism is responsible for the formation of new oceanic crust along the East Pacific Rise through the process of seafloor spreading. The Pacific plate diverges from the Cocos and Nazca plates and hot basaltic magma rises in between the plates. This magma cools and solidifies to create the EPR's ridge.

The formation of new oceanic crust along the EPR is driven by both the intrusion of magma into the shallow crust and the eruption of lava on the seafloor. Shallow dike intrusion causes subsidence near the ridge axis, and extrusive magmatism can fill a portion of the subsidence with lava. The morphology of the ridge crest is therefore determined by the rate of intrusive vs extrusive magmatic events, and the frequencies of these events appear to remain constant over timescales of several thousands of years.

Another form of magmatism that is typically seen beneath intermediate and fast-spreading mid ocean ridges is the axial melt lens (AML). These are stable bodies of magma or crystal mush located at the dike-gabbro transition, which is typically located 1-3 km below the seafloor. For fast-spreading mid ocean ridges, AMLs are typically tens to hundreds of meters tall and 1-2 km wide. Using seismic data, these formations have been imaged under much of the EPR, and although they are widely continuous, there are breaks that may coincide with discontinuities in the seafloor axial fissure zone.

There are 42 known Holocene volcanoes and 36 known Pleistocene volcanoes across the Eastern Pacific Volcanic Regions. The major volcanoes across the Northern EPR include the Axial Seamount, the Cleft Seamount, the Coaxial Segment, the Cobb Segment, the Endeavour Segment, the Escanaba Segment, and the North Gorda Ridge Segment. There are also unnamed volcanoes at 9.8°N, 10.7°N, 16°N, and 17°N. The most active among these volcanoes are the Axial Seamount, which has confirmed eruptions in 1976, 1998, 2011, and 2015, and the unnamed volcano at 9.8°N, which has confirmed eruptions in 1950, 1988, 1991, 2003, 2005, and 2025.

Volcanic activity across the EPR is typically considered to be effusive, with the uppermost sections of the volcanoes being made of rocks from the alkali volcanic suite and the lower sections being made of a tholeiitic basalt.

== Magnetic Anomalies ==
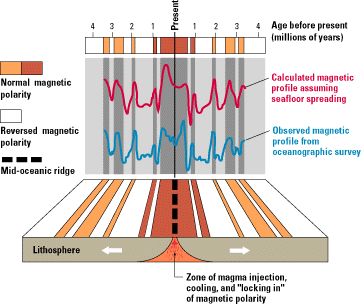
An observed magnetic profile (blue) for the ocean floor across the East Pacific Rise is matched quite well by a calculated profile (red) based on the Earth's magnetic reversals for the past 4 million years and an assumed constant rate of movement of ocean floor away from a hypothetical spreading center (bottom). The remarkable similarity of these two profiles provided one of the clinching arguments in support of the seafloor spreading hypothesis.

Distinct magnetic lineations in the Northern East Pacific Rise serve as a record of geomagnetic reversals and apparent polar wander, captured by the newly crystallized rock formed from seafloor spreading. As newly formed magma cools, its magnetic minerals become aligned with the magnetic field of the Earth. When Earth's magnetic field changes from its normal to reversed direction, these magnetic minerals capture the change and can therefore be used to reconstruct the history of the spreading center and to estimate the age of the oceanic crust.

Magnetic anomaly data has been used to reconstruct the evolution of the Northern EPR and its surrounding plates over the past 25 million years, which is how we understand the geologic history of the ridge. More recently, high resolution magnetic anomaly data from AUVs has been used to investigate the signatures of dike swarms across the EPR, which points towards the hypermagmatic characteristics of the EPR at 16°N. Magnetic anomalies have also been used to investigate the different crustal accretion processes at 9°50′N of the EPR.

== Hydrothermal Activity ==
Hydrothermal circulation occurs when seawater sinks through the permeable parts of the crust and upper mantle, heats up to temperatures around 200-400°C due to the underlying magma, and shoots out through seafloor vents. As these fluids react with the colder seawater, dissolved minerals precipitate and can form structures called black smokers. These structures can be tens of meters tall and they are formed from sulfide materials. They are considered focused vents, meaning that the fluid comes out of one pipe. When the hot fluids spread out when returning from the seafloor, diffuse vents can be created. These vents do not create chimney structures, although areas of diffuse vents often surround focused vents.

Hydrothermal activity is well studied at the Bio 9 complex, which is located at 9°50′N along the EPR. This section has a hydrothermal heat output of ∼325 ± 160 MW, and ∼42 ± 21 MW of this energy comes from high temperature vents. It was also found that the temperature of both the focused and diffuse vents in this region decreased significantly after eruptions in 1991 and 1992.

These vents also provide for the nutrients and temperatures needed to sustain many unique life forms in the EPR. Hydrothermal vents provide a warm environment where thermophilic animals can thrive. These life forms include tube worms like Tevnia jerichonana, Riftia pachyptila, and Oasisia alvinae, mussels like Bathymodiolus thermophilus, and Pompeii worms (Alvinella pompejana). Crabs like Bythograeidae are often seen at diffuse vents around 9°N along the EPR, a region which is nicknamed the Crab Spa.

== See also ==
- Pacific-Antarctic Ridge
- Lamont seamount chain
- Mid-Atlantic Ridge
- Overlapping spreading centers
- Propagating rift
- Ring of Fire
