= Peña Hueva =

Mountain in Spain

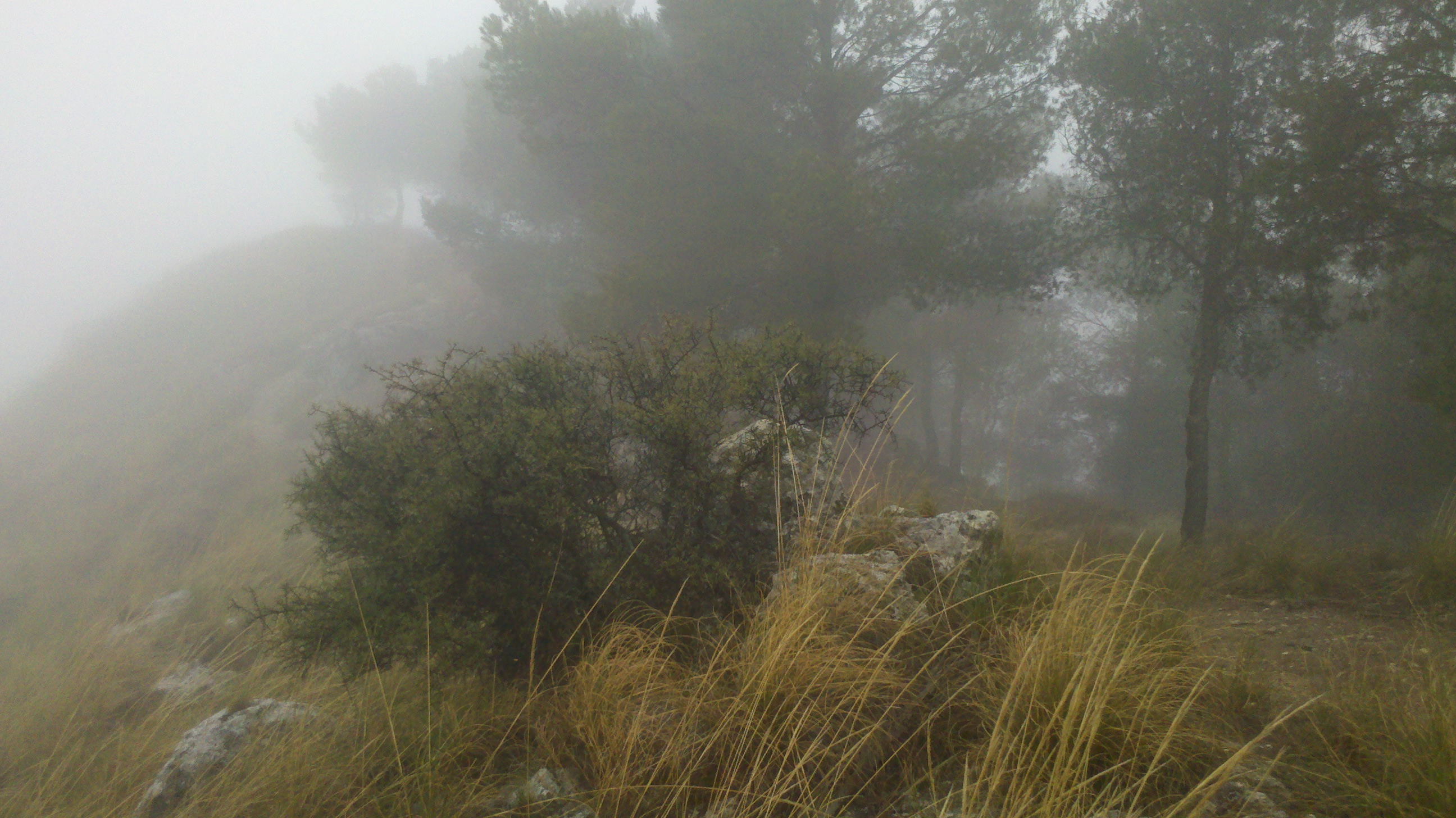
- Top of Peña Hueva

Highest point
- Elevation: 972 m (3,189 ft)
- Coordinates: 40°39′19″N 3°06′23″W

Geography
- Location: Guadalajara

The Peña Hueva is a tabular mountain at the limits of the Alcarria high plain in the Spanish province of Guadalajara.

It can be reached by dirt tracks from the west. Like the neighboring Pico del Águila on the other side of Valdenoches, Peña Hueva is an important regional destination for mountain biking.
