= List of the highest major summits of Canada =

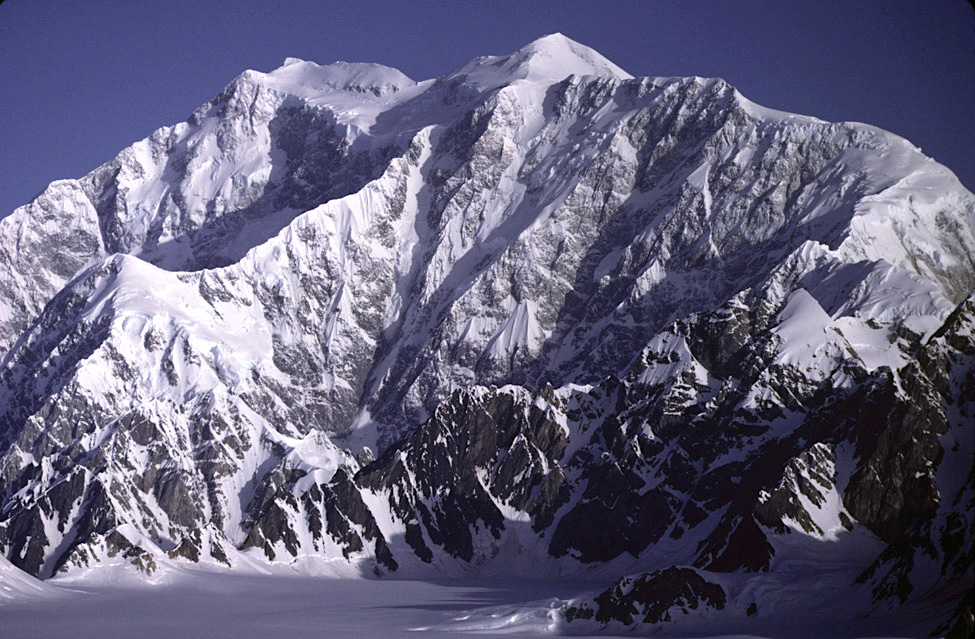
Mount Logan in the Saint Elias Mountains of Yukon is the highest peak of Canada.

The following sortable table comprises the 150 highest mountain peaks of Canada with at least 500 metres (1640 feet) of topographic prominence. (Note: This article defines a significant summit as a summit with at least 100 metres (328.1 feet) of topographic prominence, and a major summit as a summit with at least 500 metres (1640 feet) of topographic prominence. All summits in this article have at least 500 metres of topographic prominence. An ultra-prominent summit is a summit with at least 1500 metres (4921 feet) of topographic prominence.)

The summit of a mountain or hill may be measured in three principal ways:

1. The topographic elevation of a summit measures the height of the summit above a geodetic sea level. (Note: If the elevation or prominence of a summit is calculated as a range of values, the arithmetic mean is shown.)
2. The topographic prominence of a summit is a measure of how high the summit rises above its surroundings. (Note: The topographic prominence of a summit is the topographic elevation difference between the summit and its highest or key col to a higher summit. The summit may be near its key col or quite far away. The key col for Denali in Alaska is the Isthmus of Rivas in Nicaragua, 7642 kilometres (4749 miles) away.)
3. The topographic isolation (or radius of dominance) of a summit measures how far the summit lies from its nearest point of equal elevation. (Note: The topographic isolation of a summit is the great-circle distance to its nearest point of equal elevation.)

Five major Canadian summits exceed 5000 metres (16,404 feet), 11 exceed 4500 metres (14,764 feet) elevation, 19 exceed 4000 metres (13,123 feet), 41 exceed 3500 metres (11,483 feet), 69 exceed 3000 metres (9843 feet), and 125 major summits exceed 2500 metres (8202 feet) elevation.

== Highest major summits ==
Of these 150 highest major summits of Canada, 102 are located in British Columbia, 37 in Yukon, 13 in Alberta, two in Nunavut, and one in the Northwest Territories. Three of these summits lie on the British Columbia-Alberta border and two lie on the British Columbia-Yukon border. Five of these summits lie on the international Yukon-Alaska border and five lie on the international British Columbia-Alaska border.

The 150 highest summits of Canada with at least 500 metres of topographic prominence
Rank	Mountain peak	Province/Territory	Mountain range	Elevation	Prominence	Isolation	Location
1	Mount Logan (Note: The summit of Mount Logan is the highest point of the Saint Elias Mountains, Yukon, and all of Canada.)	Yukon	Saint Elias Mountains	5956 m 19,541 ft	5247 m 17,215 ft	623 km 387 mi	60.5671°N 140.4055°W
2	Mount Saint Elias (Note: Mount Saint Elias is the second-highest major summit of both Canada and the United States.)	Alaska; Yukon	Saint Elias Mountains	5489 m 18,009 ft	3429 m 11,250 ft	41.3 km 25.6 mi	60.2927°N 140.9307°W
3	Mount Lucania (Note: The summit of Mount Lucania is the highest point of the northern Saint Elias Mountains.) (Note: Mount Lucania is the northernmost summit of its elevation in Canada.)	Yukon	Saint Elias Mountains	5260 m 17,257 ft	3080 m 10,105 ft	43 km 26.7 mi	61.0215°N 140.4661°W
4	King Peak	Yukon	Saint Elias Mountains	5173 m 16,972 ft	1073 m 3,520 ft	4.68 km 2.91 mi	60.5833°N 140.6549°W
5	Mount Steele (Note: Mount Steele is the northernmost and easternmost 5000-meter (16,404-foot) summit of Canada.)	Yukon	Saint Elias Mountains	5020 m 16,470 ft	760 m 2,493 ft	9.45 km 5.87 mi	61.0929°N 140.3118°W
6	Mount Wood (Note: Mount Wood is the northernmost summit of its elevation in Canada.)	Yukon	Saint Elias Mountains	4860 m 15,945 ft	1200 m 3,937 ft	18.95 km 11.77 mi	61.2326°N 140.5123°W
7	Mount Vancouver (Note: Mount Vancouver is the easternmost summit of its elevation in Canada.)	Yukon	Saint Elias Mountains	4812 m 15,787 ft	2712 m 8,898 ft	44 km 27.4 mi	60.3589°N 139.6980°W
8	Mount Slaggard	Yukon	Saint Elias Mountains	4742 m 15,558 ft	522 m 1,713 ft	7.74 km 4.81 mi	61.1727°N 140.5851°W
9	Mount Fairweather (Note: Mount Fairweather lies on the international border between Alaska and British Columbia. The peak is the highest point of the Canadian Province of British Columbia and the southernmost and easternmost summit of its elevation in both Canada and the United States.) (Fairweather Mountain)	Alaska; British Columbia	Saint Elias Mountains	4671 m 15,325 ft	3961 m 12,995 ft	200 km 124.4 mi	58.9064°N 137.5265°W
10	Mount Hubbard	Alaska; Yukon	Saint Elias Mountains	4557 m 14,951 ft	2457 m 8,061 ft	34.4 km 21.3 mi	60.3194°N 139.0726°W
11	Mount Walsh	Yukon	Saint Elias Mountains	4506 m 14,783 ft	1366 m 4,482 ft	18.76 km 11.66 mi	61.0037°N 140.0171°W
12	Mount Alverstone (Boundary Point 180)	Alaska; Yukon	Saint Elias Mountains	4420 m 14,500 ft	594 m 1,950 ft	3.62 km 2.25 mi	60.3518°N 139.0749°W
13	McArthur Peak	Yukon	Saint Elias Mountains	4380 m 14,370 ft	960 m 3,150 ft	9.1 km 5.65 mi	60.6069°N 140.2144°W
14	Mount Augusta	Alaska; Yukon	Saint Elias Mountains	4289 m 14,070 ft	1549 m 5,082 ft	23.2 km 14.41 mi	60.3074°N 140.4584°W
15	Mount Strickland (Note: Mount Strickland is the northernmost summit of its elevation in Canada.)	Yukon	Saint Elias Mountains	4260 m 13,976 ft	800 m 2,625 ft	7.35 km 4.57 mi	61.2365°N 140.6755°W
16	Avalanche Peak (Note: Avalanche Peak is the northernmost summit of its elevation in Canada.)	Yukon	Saint Elias Mountains	4228 m 13,871 ft	608 m 1,995 ft	4.54 km 2.82 mi	61.2401°N 140.7597°W
17	Mount Cook	Alaska; Yukon	Saint Elias Mountains	4194 m 13,760 ft	2350 m 7,710 ft	23.4 km 14.54 mi	60.1816°N 139.9811°W
18	Mount Craig (Note: Mount Craig is the northernmost 4000-meter (13,123-foot) summit of Canada.)	Yukon	Saint Elias Mountains	4060 m 13,320 ft	520 m 1,706 ft	6.97 km 4.33 mi	61.2636°N 140.8800°W
19	Mount Waddington (Note: The summit of Mount Waddington is the highest point of the Coast Mountains.) (Note: Mount Waddington is the southernmost and easternmost 4000-meter (13,123-foot) summit of Canada.)	British Columbia	Coast Mountains	4019 m 13,186 ft	3289 m 10,791 ft	562 km 349 mi	51.3737°N 125.2636°W
20	Spring Glacier Peak	Yukon	Saint Elias Mountains	3976 m 13,045 ft	676 m 2,218 ft	6 km 3.73 mi	61.0408°N 139.9328°W
21	Mount Robson (Note: The summit of Mount Robson is the highest point of the Canadian Rockies.) (Note: Mount Robson is the easternmost summit of its elevation in Canada and the northernmost and westernmost summit of its elevation in the Rocky Mountains.)	British Columbia	Canadian Rockies	3959 m 12,989 ft	2829 m 9,281 ft	460 km 286 mi	53.1105°N 119.1566°W
22	Mount Harrison (Yukon)	Yukon	Saint Elias Mountains	3935 m 12,910 ft	875 m 2,871 ft	11 km 6.84 mi	61.0781°N 140.1019°W
23	Mount Queen Mary	Yukon	Saint Elias Mountains	3928 m 12,887 ft	1348 m 4,423 ft	25.3 km 15.69 mi	60.6286°N 139.7247°W
23	Mount Root	Alaska; British Columbia	Saint Elias Mountains	3928 m 12,887 ft	908 m 2,979 ft	8.79 km 5.46 mi	58.9854°N 137.5001°W
25	Mount Tiedemann	British Columbia	Coast Mountains	3838 m 12,592 ft	848 m 2,782 ft	2.86 km 1.78 mi	51.3940°N 125.2366°W
26	Centennial Peak	Yukon	Saint Elias Mountains	3820 m 12,533 ft	960 m 3,150 ft	9.77 km 6.07 mi	60.9470°N 140.7217°W
27	Mount Malaspina	Yukon	Saint Elias Mountains	3776 m 12,388 ft	936 m 3,071 ft	6.39 km 3.97 mi	60.3182°N 140.5719°W
28	Mount Columbia (Note: Mount Columbia on the Great Divide between British Columbia and Alberta is the highest point of the Columbia Icefield, the Province of Alberta, and the entire Beaufort Sea Drainage basin.)	Alberta; British Columbia	Canadian Rockies	3741 m 12,274 ft	2371 m 7,779 ft	158 km 98.2 mi	52.1473°N 117.4416°W
28	Mount King George	Yukon	Saint Elias Mountains	3741 m 12,274 ft	1281 m 4,203 ft	11.3 km 7.02 mi	60.5314°N 139.7841°W
30	Mount Johansen	Yukon	Saint Elias Mountains	3740 m 12,270 ft	560 m 1,837 ft	20 km 12.43 mi	60.6832°N 140.6823°W
31	North Twin Peak (Note: North Twin Peak is the easternmost summit of its elevation in Canada.)	Alberta	Canadian Rockies	3733 m 12,247 ft	743 m 2,438 ft	8.52 km 5.29 mi	52.2238°N 117.4345°W
32	Mount Clemenceau (Note: The summit of Mount Clemenceau is the highest point of the Clémenceau Icefield.)	British Columbia	Canadian Rockies	3664 m 12,021 ft	1494 m 4,902 ft	35.9 km 22.3 mi	52.2475°N 117.9578°W
33	Mount Alberta (Note: The summit of Mount Alberta is the highest point of the Winston Churchill Range.)	Alberta	Canadian Rockies	3620 m 11,877 ft	800 m 2,625 ft	6.86 km 4.26 mi	52.2850°N 117.4772°W
34	Mount Forbes (Note: The summit of Mount Forbes is the highest point of the entire Hudson Bay drainage basin.) (Note: Mount Forbes is the easternmost summit of its elevation in Canada.)	Alberta	Canadian Rockies	3617 m 11,867 ft	1649 m 5,410 ft	47.4 km 29.5 mi	51.8600°N 116.9316°W
35	Mount Assiniboine (Note: Mount Assiniboine is the southernmost and easternmost summit of its elevation in Canada.)	Alberta; British Columbia	Canadian Rockies	3616 m 11,864 ft	2082 m 6,831 ft	141.8 km 88.1 mi	50.8696°N 115.6509°W
36	Mount Goodsir (Note: The summit of Mount Goodsir is the highest point of the Ottertail Range.)	British Columbia	Canadian Rockies	3567 m 11,703 ft	1917 m 6,289 ft	64.1 km 39.8 mi	51.2021°N 116.3975°W
37	Monarch Mountain (Note: The summit of Monarch Mountain is the highest point of the Monarch Icefield.)	British Columbia	Coast Mountains	3555 m 11,663 ft	2925 m 9,596 ft	71.4 km 44.4 mi	51.8995°N 125.8760°W
38	Mount Temple (Note: The summit of Mount Temple is the highest point of the Bow Range.)	Alberta	Canadian Rockies	3540 m 11,614 ft	1530 m 5,020 ft	21.3 km 13.22 mi	51.3511°N 116.2063°W
39	Mount Brazeau	Alberta	Canadian Rockies	3525 m 11,565 ft	1475 m 4,839 ft	30.8 km 19.14 mi	52.5515°N 117.3549°W
40	Mount Sir Sandford (Note: The summit of Mount Sir Sandford is the highest point of the Columbia Mountains.)	British Columbia	Columbia Mountains	3519 m 11,545 ft	2703 m 8,868 ft	62 km 38.5 mi	51.6566°N 117.8676°W
41	Mount Sir Wilfrid Laurier (Note: The summit of Mount Sir Wilfrid Laurier is the highest point of the Cariboo Mountains.)	British Columbia	Columbia Mountains	3516 m 11,535 ft	2728 m 8,950 ft	51.7 km 32.1 mi	52.8015°N 119.7315°W
42	Mount Farnham (Note: The summit of Mount Farnham is the highest point of the Purcell Mountains.) (Note: Mount Farnham is the southernmost summit of its elevation in Canada.)	British Columbia	Columbia Mountains	3493 m 11,460 ft	2123 m 6,965 ft	72.7 km 45.2 mi	50.4888°N 116.4871°W
43	Mount Joffre (Note: Mount Joffre is the easternmost summit of its elevation in Canada.)	Alberta; British Columbia	Canadian Rockies	3433 m 11,263 ft	1505 m 4,938 ft	49.2 km 30.6 mi	50.5285°N 115.2069°W
44	Mount King George (British Columbia) (Note: Mount King George (British Columbia) is the highest summit of its elevation in The Royal Group.)	British Columbia	Canadian Rockies	3413 m 11,198 ft	1329 m 4,360 ft	15.94 km 9.9 mi	50.5965°N 115.4049°W
45	Howser Spire	British Columbia	Columbia Mountains	3412 m 11,194 ft	1299 m 4,262 ft	35.4 km 22 mi	50.7296°N 116.8134°W
46	Whitehorn Mountain (Note: Whitehorn Mountain is the northernmost and westernmost summit of its elevation in the Rocky Mountains.)	British Columbia	Canadian Rockies	3399 m 11,152 ft	1747 m 5,732 ft	7.94 km 4.93 mi	53.1370°N 119.2667°W
47	Mount Hector	Alberta	Canadian Rockies	3394 m 11,135 ft	1759 m 5,771 ft	21.5 km 13.34 mi	51.5752°N 116.2590°W
48	Mount Dawson	British Columbia	Columbia Mountains	3377 m 11,079 ft	2045 m 6,709 ft	63.4 km 39.4 mi	51.1516°N 117.4206°W
49	Mount Edith Cavell	Alberta	Canadian Rockies	3363 m 11,033 ft	2033 m 6,670 ft	47.2 km 29.3 mi	52.6672°N 118.0569°W
50	Mount Fryatt (Note: The summit of Mount Fryatt is the highest point of the Hooker Icefield.)	Alberta	Canadian Rockies	3361 m 11,027 ft	1608 m 5,276 ft	16.37 km 10.17 mi	52.5503°N 117.9104°W
51	Mount Harrison (Note: Mount Harrison is the southernmost and easternmost 3000-meter (9843-foot) summit of Canada.)	British Columbia	Canadian Rockies	3360 m 11,024 ft	1770 m 5,807 ft	52.1 km 32.4 mi	50.0604°N 115.2057°W
52	Mount Chown (Note: Mount Chown is the northernmost and westernmost summit of its elevation in the Rocky Mountains.)	Alberta	Canadian Rockies	3316 m 10,879 ft	1746 m 5,728 ft	30.7 km 19.05 mi	53.3971°N 119.4173°W
53	Mount Nelson	British Columbia	Columbia Mountains	3313 m 10,869 ft	523 m 1,716 ft	7.22 km 4.49 mi	50.4601°N 116.3515°W
54	Mount Queen Bess (Note: The summit of Mount Queen Bess is the highest point of the Homathko Icefield.)	British Columbia	Coast Mountains	3298 m 10,820 ft	2355 m 7,726 ft	45.5 km 28.2 mi	51.2714°N 124.5682°W
55	Mount Sir Donald (Note: The summit of Mount Sir Donald is the highest point of the Sir Donald Range.)	British Columbia	Selkirk Mountains	3284 m 10,774 ft	874 m 2,867 ft	12.38 km 7.69 mi	51.2631°N 117.4314°W
56	Mount Sir Alexander (Note: Mount Sir Alexander is the northernmost and westernmost 3000-meter (9843-foot) summit and ultra-prominent summit of the Rocky Mountains.)	British Columbia	Canadian Rockies	3275 m 10,745 ft	1762 m 5,781 ft	87.8 km 54.5 mi	53.9360°N 120.3869°W
57	Mount Monashee (Note: The summit of Mount Monashee is the highest point of the Monashee Mountains.)	British Columbia	Columbia Mountains	3274 m 10,741 ft	2404 m 7,887 ft	51.8 km 32.2 mi	52.3853°N 118.9399°W
58	Good Hope Mountain (Note: The summit of Good Hope Mountain is the highest point of the Bugaboos.)	British Columbia	Coast Mountains	3242 m 10,636 ft	1497 m 4,911 ft	31.2 km 19.38 mi	51.1425°N 124.1719°W
59	Mount Ida (Note: Mount Ida is the northernmost 3000-meter (9843-foot) summit and ultra-prominent summit of the Rocky Mountains.)	British Columbia	Canadian Rockies	3200 m 10,499 ft	1530 m 5,020 ft	14.14 km 8.79 mi	54.0580°N 120.3268°W
60	Razorback Mountain (Note: The summit of Razorback Mountain is the highest point of the Niut Range.)	British Columbia	Coast Mountains	3183 m 10,443 ft	2153 m 7,064 ft	36.5 km 22.7 mi	51.5905°N 124.6912°W
61	Monmouth Mountain (Note: The summit of Monmouth Mountain is the highest point of the Lillooet Icefield.) (Mount Monmouth)	British Columbia	Coast Mountains	3182 m 10,440 ft	1602 m 5,256 ft	31.6 km 19.6 mi	50.9924°N 123.7900°W
62	Mount Cooper (Note: The summit of Mount Cooper is the highest point of the Goat Range.)	British Columbia	Columbia Mountains	3094 m 10,151 ft	2319 m 7,608 ft	42.5 km 26.4 mi	50.1797°N 117.1992°W
63	Mount Ratz (Note: The summit of Mount Ratz is the highest point of the Boundary Ranges.)	British Columbia	Coast Mountains	3090 m 10,138 ft	2430 m 7,972 ft	311 km 193.4 mi	57.3930°N 132.3031°W
64	Jeanette Peak	British Columbia	Canadian Rockies	3089 m 10,135 ft	1657 m 5,436 ft	17.54 km 10.9 mi	52.6357°N 118.6166°W
65	Mount Tatlow	British Columbia	Coast Mountains	3063 m 10,049 ft	1613 m 5,292 ft	34.4 km 21.4 mi	51.3843°N 123.8641°W
66	Kates Needle	Alaska; British Columbia	Coast Mountains	3053 m 10,016 ft	1383 m 4,537 ft	41.8 km 26 mi	57.0449°N 132.0451°W
67	Talchako Mountain	British Columbia	Coast Mountains	3037 m 9,964 ft	1676 m 5,499 ft	19.23 km 11.95 mi	52.0919°N 126.0159°W
68	Ulysses Mountain (Note: The summit of Ulysses Mountain is the highest point of the Far Northern Rockies.) (Note: Ulysses Mountain is the northernmost 3000-metre (9843-foot) summit of the Rocky Mountains.) (Mount Ulysses)	British Columbia	Muskwa Ranges	3024 m 9,921 ft	2294 m 7,526 ft	436 km 271 mi	57.3464°N 124.0928°W
69	Scud Peak	British Columbia	Coast Mountains	2987 m 9,800 ft	2172 m 7,126 ft	57.4 km 35.7 mi	57.2412°N 131.1676°W
70	Mount Brett (Note: The summit of Mount Brett is the highest point of the Massive Range.)	Alberta	Massive Range	2984 m 9,790 ft	899 m 2,949 ft	12.94 km 8.04 mi	51.1621°N 115.8216°W
71	Mount Odin (Note: The summit of Mount Odin is the highest point of the Gold Range.)	British Columbia	Columbia Mountains	2971 m 9,747 ft	2409 m 7,904 ft	65.4 km 40.7 mi	50.5518°N 118.1293°W
72	Skihist Mountain (Note: The summit of Skihist Mountain is the highest point of the Lillooet Range.)	British Columbia	Coast Mountains	2968 m 9,738 ft	2458 m 8,064 ft	157.1 km 97.6 mi	50.1878°N 121.9032°W
73	Ambition Mountain	British Columbia	Coast Mountains	2953 m 9,688 ft	1513 m 4,964 ft	25.7 km 15.95 mi	57.3949°N 131.4851°W
74	Keele Peak (Note: The summit of Keele Peak is the highest point of the Mackenzie Mountains.) (Note: Keele Peak is the northernmost summit of its elevation in Canada.)	Yukon	Mackenzie Mountains	2952 m 9,685 ft	2161 m 7,090 ft	543 km 337 mi	63.4314°N 130.3243°W
75	Mount Ovington	British Columbia	Hart Ranges	2949 m 9,675 ft	1600 m 5,249 ft	18.75 km 11.65 mi	54.1433°N 120.5740°W
76	Mount Sylvia	British Columbia	Muskwa Ranges	2940 m 9,646 ft	1559 m 5,115 ft	73.8 km 45.9 mi	58.0820°N 124.4688°W
77	Whitecap Mountain (Note: The summit of Whitecap Mountain is the highest point of the Bendor Range.)	British Columbia	Coast Mountains	2918 m 9,573 ft	1533 m 5,030 ft	71.4 km 44.4 mi	50.7162°N 122.5085°W
78	Mount Saugstad	British Columbia	Coast Mountains	2908 m 9,541 ft	1850 m 6,070 ft	38.6 km 24 mi	52.2542°N 126.5148°W
79	The Horn	British Columbia	Coast Mountains	2907 m 9,537 ft	1527 m 5,010 ft	20.3 km 12.63 mi	52.3190°N 126.2363°W
80	Chutine Peak	British Columbia	Coast Mountains	2903 m 9,524 ft	1758 m 5,768 ft	42.6 km 26.5 mi	57.7753°N 132.3346°W
81	Wedge Mountain	British Columbia	Coast Mountains	2892 m 9,488 ft	2249 m 7,379 ft	63.9 km 39.7 mi	50.1330°N 122.7933°W
82	Silverthrone Mountain (Note: The summit of Silverthrone Mountain is the highest point of the Ha-Iltzuk Icefield.)	British Columbia	Coast Mountains	2864 m 9,396 ft	974 m 3,196 ft	40.1 km 24.9 mi	51.5180°N 126.1133°W
83	Mount Seton (Note: The summit of Mount Seton is the highest point of the Cayoosh Range.) (Goat Mountain)	British Columbia	Coast Mountains	2855 m 9,367 ft	1580 m 5,184 ft	20.4 km 12.64 mi	50.6237°N 122.2600°W
84	Mount Aylesworth	Alaska; British Columbia	Saint Elias Mountains	2830 m 9,285 ft	1420 m 4,659 ft	27.1 km 16.81 mi	59.9242°N 138.7985°W
85	Gladsheim Peak (Note: Gladsheim Peak is the southernmost summit of its elevation in Canada.)	British Columbia	Columbia Mountains	2830 m 9,285 ft	2056 m 6,745 ft	53.4 km 33.2 mi	49.7867°N 117.6272°W
86	Mount Cairnes	Yukon	Saint Elias Mountains	2820 m 9,252 ft	2000 m 6,562 ft	40.2 km 25 mi	60.8683°N 138.2764°W
87	Dickson Peak	British Columbia	Coast Mountains	2814 m 9,232 ft	832 m 2,730 ft	20.7 km 12.84 mi	50.893679°N 122.988473°W
88	Cond Peak (Note: The summit of Cond Peak is the highest point of the Kokanee Range.) (Note: Cond Peak is the southernmost summit of its elevation in Canada.)	British Columbia	Columbia Mountains	2801 m 9,190 ft	1720 m 5,643 ft	35.3 km 21.9 mi	49.7462°N 117.1419°W
89	Mount Edziza	British Columbia	Coast Mountains	2793 m 9,163 ft	1763 m 5,784 ft	61.8 km 38.4 mi	57.7156°N 130.6345°W
90	Mount Nirvana (Note: The summit of Mount Nirvana is the highest point of the Northwest Territories of Canada.)	Northwest Territories	Mackenzie Mountains	2773 m 9,098 ft	1663 m 5,456 ft	220 km 136.8 mi	61.8752°N 127.6807°W
91	Mount Macdonald (Note: The summit of Mount Macdonald is the highest point of the Bonnet Plume Mountains.) (Note: Mount Macdonald is the northernmost summit of its elevation in Canada.)	Yukon	Mackenzie Mountains	2760 m 9,055 ft	1555 m 5,102 ft	187.5 km 116.5 mi	64.7256°N 132.7781°W
92	Howson Peak (Note: The summit of Howson Peak is the highest point of the Hazleton Mountains.)	British Columbia	Coast Mountains	2759 m 9,052 ft	1829 m 6,001 ft	254 km 158 mi	54.4185°N 127.7441°W
93	Tsaydaychuz Peak	British Columbia	Coast Mountains	2758 m 9,049 ft	1826 m 5,991 ft	82.8 km 51.4 mi	53.0212°N 126.6401°W
94	Overseer Mountain (Note: The summit of Overseer Mountain is the highest point of the Pemberton Icefield.)	British Columbia	Coast Mountains	2749 m 9,019 ft	1679 m 5,509 ft	19.39 km 12.05 mi	50.5288°N 123.3809°W
95	Thudaka Mountain (Note: The summit of Thudaka Mountain is the highest point of Cassiar Mountains.)	British Columbia	Cassiar Mountains	2748 m 9,016 ft	1739 m 5,705 ft	103.5 km 64.3 mi	57.9272°N 126.8485°W
96	Seven Sisters Peaks	British Columbia	Coast Mountains	2747 m 9,012 ft	1862 m 6,109 ft	68.8 km 42.7 mi	54.9678°N 128.2319°W
97	Alsek Peak	Yukon	Saint Elias Mountains	2740 m 8,990 ft	2025 m 6,644 ft	68.5 km 42.5 mi	60.0325°N 137.5915°W
98	Mount Jancowski	British Columbia	Coast Mountains	2729 m 8,953 ft	2079 m 6,821 ft	124 km 77.1 mi	56.3372°N 129.9817°W
99	Mount Pattullo	British Columbia	Coast Mountains	2727 m 8,947 ft	1617 m 5,305 ft	23.1 km 14.37 mi	56.2339°N 129.6576°W
100	Atna Peak	British Columbia	Coast Mountains	2724 m 8,937 ft	1828 m 5,997 ft	56.8 km 35.3 mi	53.9398°N 128.0456°W
101	Buckwell Peak	British Columbia; Yukon	Saint Elias Mountains	2721 m 8,927 ft	1971 m 6,467 ft	56.4 km 35 mi	59.4188°N 136.7653°W
102	Basement Peak	British Columbia	Saint Elias Mountains	2706 m 8,878 ft	1606 m 5,269 ft	23.6 km 14.66 mi	59.3551°N 137.1614°W
103	Otter Mountain	British Columbia	Coast Mountains	2692 m 8,832 ft	2242 m 7,356 ft	25.4 km 15.78 mi	56.0066°N 129.6928°W
104	Sharktooth Mountain	British Columbia	Cassiar Mountains	2668 m 8,753 ft	1653 m 5,423 ft	98.4 km 61.2 mi	58.5876°N 127.9625°W
105	Thunder Mountain	British Columbia	Coast Mountains	2664 m 8,740 ft	1694 m 5,558 ft	27.6 km 17.14 mi	52.5531°N 126.3698°W
106	Dunn Peak (Note: The summit of Dunn Peak is the highest point of the Shuswap Highland.)	British Columbia	Columbia Mountains	2636 m 8,648 ft	1531 m 5,023 ft	87.1 km 54.1 mi	51.4372°N 119.9546°W
107	Barbeau Peak (Note: The summit of Barbeau Peak is the highest point of Ellesmere Island and Nunavut of Canada.) (Note: Barbeau Peak is the northernmost ultra-prominent summit of Canada and greater North America.)	Nunavut	Ellesmere Island	2616 m 8,583 ft	2616 m 8,583 ft	796 km 495 mi	81.9148°N 75.0093°W
108	Mount Wotzke (Note: The summit of Mount Wotzke is the highest point of the Quesnel Highland.)	British Columbia	Quesnel Highland	2597 m 8,520 ft	1556 m 5,105 ft	26.1 km 16.19 mi	52.7131°N 120.6507°W
109	Silvertip Mountain (Note: The summit of Silvertip Mountain is the highest point of the Hope Mountains.) (Note: Silvertip Mountain is the southernmost ultra-prominent summit of Canada.)	British Columbia	Cascade Range	2596 m 8,517 ft	1866 m 6,122 ft	19.55 km 12.15 mi	49.1633°N 121.2161°W
110	Unuk Peak	British Columbia	Coast Mountains	2595 m 8,514 ft	1725 m 5,659 ft	13.79 km 8.57 mi	56.3764°N 130.1933°W
111	Devils Paw (Note: The summit of Devils Paw is the highest point of the Juneau Icefield.)	Alaska; British Columbia	Coast Mountains	2593 m 8,507 ft	1703 m 5,587 ft	136.3 km 84.7 mi	58.7289°N 133.8402°W
112	Hudson Bay Mountain	British Columbia	Coast Mountains	2589 m 8,494 ft	1609 m 5,279 ft	51 km 31.7 mi	54.8116°N 127.3396°W
113	Shedin Peak (Note: The summit of Shedin Peak is the highest point of the Skeena Mountains.)	British Columbia	Skeena Mountains	2588 m 8,491 ft	1798 m 5,899 ft	118.2 km 73.4 mi	55.9392°N 127.4799°W
113	Mount Archibald	Yukon	Saint Elias Mountains	2588 m 8,491 ft	1678 m 5,505 ft	23.8 km 14.81 mi	60.7842°N 137.8736°W
115	North Pinnacle (Note: The summit of North Pinnacle is the highest point of the Whatshan Range.)	British Columbia	Columbia Mountains	2573 m 8,442 ft	1667 m 5,469 ft	31.8 km 19.74 mi	50.1953°N 118.2290°W
116	Mount Perseus	British Columbia	Quesnel Highland	2553 m 8,376 ft	1683 m 5,522 ft	24.9 km 15.48 mi	52.3541°N 120.5327°W
117	Detour Peak	British Columbia; Yukon	Saint Elias Mountains	2550 m 8,366 ft	1906 m 6,253 ft	21.2 km 13.16 mi	59.8424°N 137.5856°W
118	Mount Porsild	Yukon	Coast Mountains	2545 m 8,350 ft	1655 m 5,430 ft	82 km 51 mi	60.0840°N 136.0154°W
119	Kaza Mountain	British Columbia	Columbia Mountains	2543 m 8,343 ft	1573 m 5,161 ft	35.5 km 22 mi	53.0711°N 121.0089°W
120	Bower Peak (Note: The summit of Bower Peak is the highest point of the Omineca Mountains.)	British Columbia	Omineca Mountains	2535 m 8,317 ft	1270 m 4,167 ft	26.1 km 16.21 mi	57.2495°N 126.3939°W
121	Gataga Peak	British Columbia	Muskwa Ranges	2533 m 8,310 ft	1515 m 4,970 ft	35.3 km 21.9 mi	58.0697°N 125.7010°W
122	Whiting Peak	British Columbia	Coast Mountains	2524 m 8,281 ft	1669 m 5,476 ft	53.9 km 33.5 mi	58.1389°N 132.9346°W
123	Pass Mountain (Note: The summit of Pass Mountain is the highest point of the Wernecke Mountains.)	Yukon	Mackenzie Mountains	2515 m 8,250 ft	1524 m 5,000 ft	46.9 km 29.1 mi	64.5140°N 133.6254°W
124	Sentinel Peak (Note: The summit of Sentinel Peak is the highest point of the Murray Range.) (Note: Sentinel Peak is the northernmost and westernmost 2000-meter (6562-foot) summit of the Rocky Mountains.)	British Columbia	Canadian Rockies	2513 m 8,245 ft	1452 m 4,764 ft	86.6 km 53.8 mi	54.9080°N 121.9610°W
125	Mount Martha Black	Yukon	Saint Elias Mountains	2512 m 8,241 ft	1797 m 5,896 ft	18.59 km 11.55 mi	60.6716°N 137.6224°W
126	Brian Boru Peak	British Columbia	Coast Mountains	2507 m 8,225 ft	1832 m 6,010 ft	32.8 km 20.4 mi	55.0739°N 127.5742°W
127	Birkenhead Peak	British Columbia	Coast Mountains	2506 m 8,222 ft	1781 m 5,843 ft	10.14 km 6.3 mi	50.5112°N 122.6210°W
128	Lehua Mountain	British Columbia	Coast Mountains	2469 m 8,100 ft	1659 m 5,443 ft	40 km 24.9 mi	56.4910°N 130.7710°W
128	Delta Peak	British Columbia	Omineca Mountains	2469 m 8,100 ft	1119 m 3,671 ft	4.58 km 2.85 mi	57.2881°N 126.4197°W
130	Kootenay Mountain (Note: The summit of Kootenay Mountain is the highest point of the Nelson Range.)	British Columbia	Columbia Mountains	2456 m 8,058 ft	1801 m 5,909 ft	60 km 37.3 mi	49.2407°N 116.8226°W
131	Mount Thomlinson	British Columbia	Skeena Mountains	2451 m 8,041 ft	1661 m 5,449 ft	44 km 27.4 mi	55.5439°N 127.4864°W
132	Hubris Peak	British Columbia	Coast Mountains	2445 m 8,022 ft	1640 m 5,381 ft	51.9 km 32.2 mi	56.5518°N 130.9733°W
133	Ferriston Peak	British Columbia	Omineca Mountains	2438 m 7,999 ft	1126 m 3,694 ft	67 km 41.6 mi	57.1089°N 125.9053°W
134	Mount Crysdale	British Columbia	Misinchinka Ranges	2429 m 7,969 ft	1554 m 5,098 ft	147.3 km 91.5 mi	55.9383°N 123.4210°W
135	Sittakanay Peak (Bel Canto Peak)	British Columbia	Coast Mountains	2415 m 7,923 ft	1710 m 5,610 ft	38.9 km 24.1 mi	58.4786°N 133.3623°W
136	Mount Lester Jones	British Columbia	Coast Mountains	2408 m 7,900 ft	1658 m 5,440 ft	27.7 km 17.21 mi	58.7174°N 133.2306°W
137	Fox Mountain (Note: The summit of Fox Mountain is the highest point of the Pelly Mountains.)	Yukon	Pelly Mountains	2404 m 7,887 ft	1444 m 4,738 ft	229 km 142.5 mi	61.9224°N 133.3677°W
138	Mount Cronin	British Columbia	Skeena Mountains	2396 m 7,861 ft	1571 m 5,154 ft	33.3 km 20.7 mi	54.9301°N 126.8638°W
139	Mount Priestley	British Columbia	Coast Mountains	2366 m 7,762 ft	1945 m 6,381 ft	50.4 km 31.3 mi	55.2297°N 128.8759°W
140	Chatsquot Mountain	British Columbia	Coast Mountains	2365 m 7,759 ft	1981 m 6,499 ft	57.7 km 35.8 mi	53.1422°N 127.4773°W
141	Mount Frank Rae (Note: The summit of Mount Frank Rae is the highest point of the Ogilvie Mountains.)	Yukon	Ogilvie Mountains	2362 m 7,750 ft	1367 m 4,486 ft	224 km 139.4 mi	64.4706°N 138.5553°W
142	Beitstad Peak	Nunavut	Ellesmere Island	2347 m 7,700 ft	2044 m 6,706 ft	354 km 220 mi	78.8007°N 79.5292°W
143	Fleet Peak	British Columbia	Omineca Mountains	2337 m 7,667 ft	838 m 2,749 ft	52.8 km 32.8 mi	56.7802°N 126.2714°W
144	Oscar Peak	British Columbia	Coast Mountains	2336 m 7,664 ft	2099 m 6,886 ft	35.5 km 22 mi	54.9289°N 129.0594°W
145	Upper Saddle Mountain	British Columbia	Columbia Mountains	2330 m 7,644 ft	1645 m 5,397 ft	23.6 km 14.68 mi	50.1726°N 117.9000°W
146	Dalton Peak	Yukon	Saint Elias Mountains	2329 m 7,641 ft	1549 m 5,082 ft	32.9 km 20.4 mi	60.4767°N 137.1728°W
147	Sharks Teeth Peaks	British Columbia	Coast Mountains	2304 m 7,559 ft	1914 m 6,280 ft	21.9 km 13.6 mi	53.0071°N 127.2400°W
148	Pukeashun Mountain	British Columbia	Columbia Mountains	2301 m 7,549 ft	1696 m 5,564 ft	56.4 km 35.1 mi	51.2046°N 119.2353°W
149	Kwatna Peak	British Columbia	Coast Mountains	2290 m 7,513 ft	2225 m 7,300 ft	36.9 km 22.9 mi	52.0706°N 126.9630°W
150	Mount Irish	British Columbia	Omineca Mountains	2280 m 7,480 ft	1170 m 3,839 ft	29.5 km 18.31 mi	57.3875°N 125.9664°W
151	Mount Judge Howay	British Columbia	Coast Mountains	2262 m 7,421 ft	1627 m 5,338 ft	35.7 km 22.2 mi	49.5072°N 122.3218°W

== Gallery ==
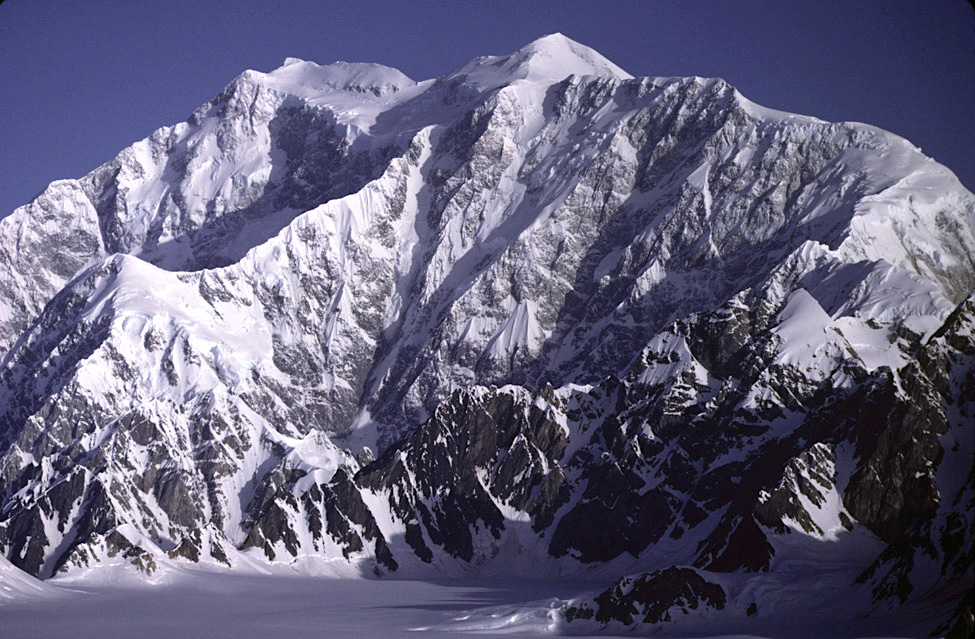
1. Mount Logan in Yukon is the highest summit of Canada.

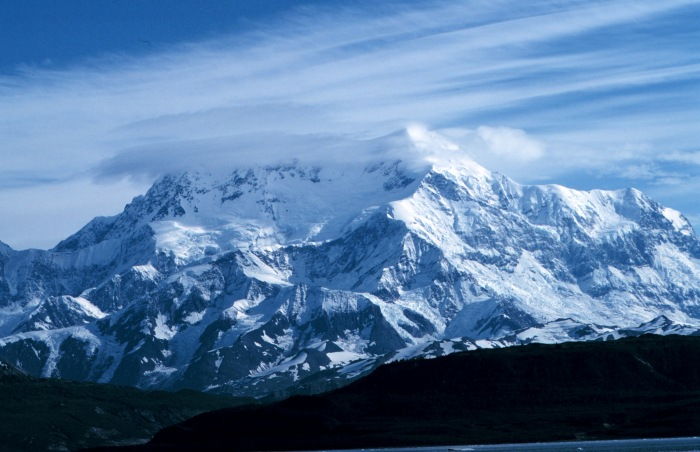
2. Mount Saint Elias is the second-highest summit of both Canada and the United States.

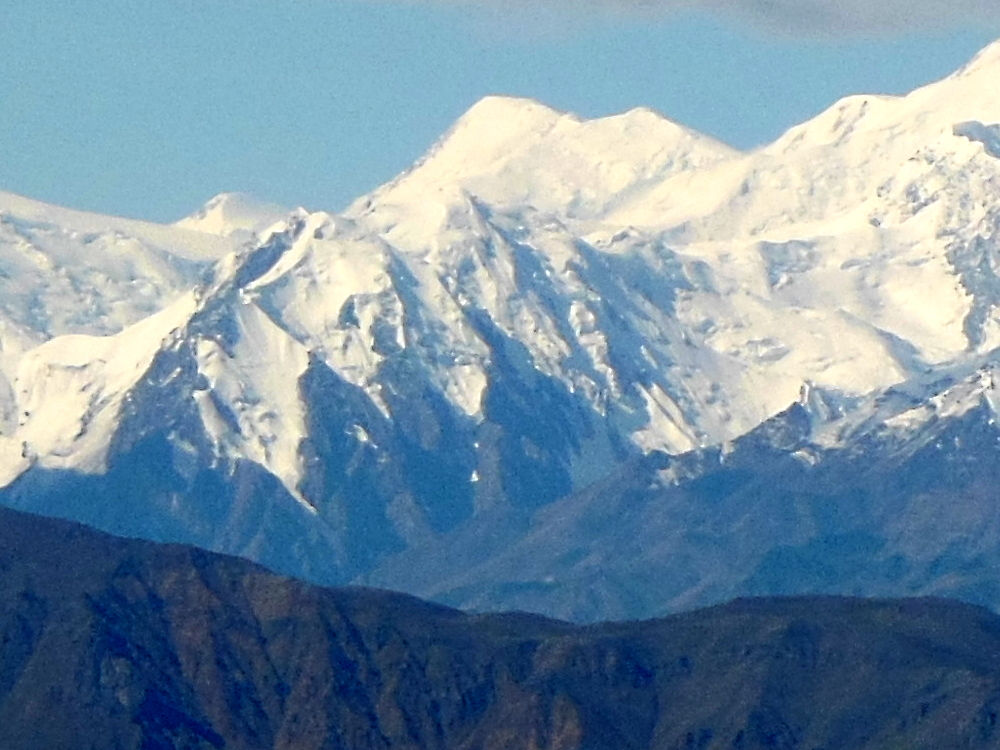
3. Mount Lucania in Yukon is the highest summit of the northern Saint Elias Mountains.

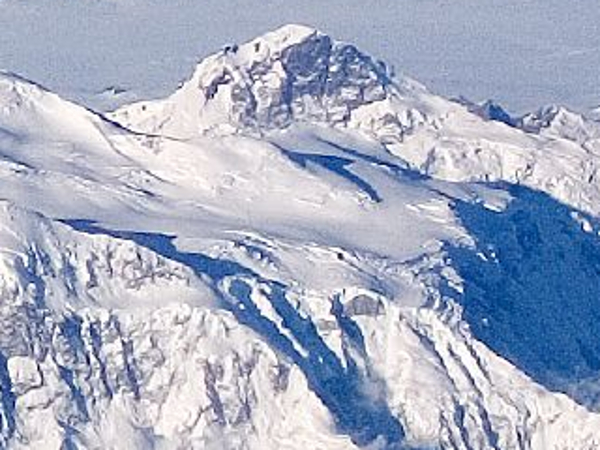
4. King Peak in Yukon is the fourth-highest summit of Canada.

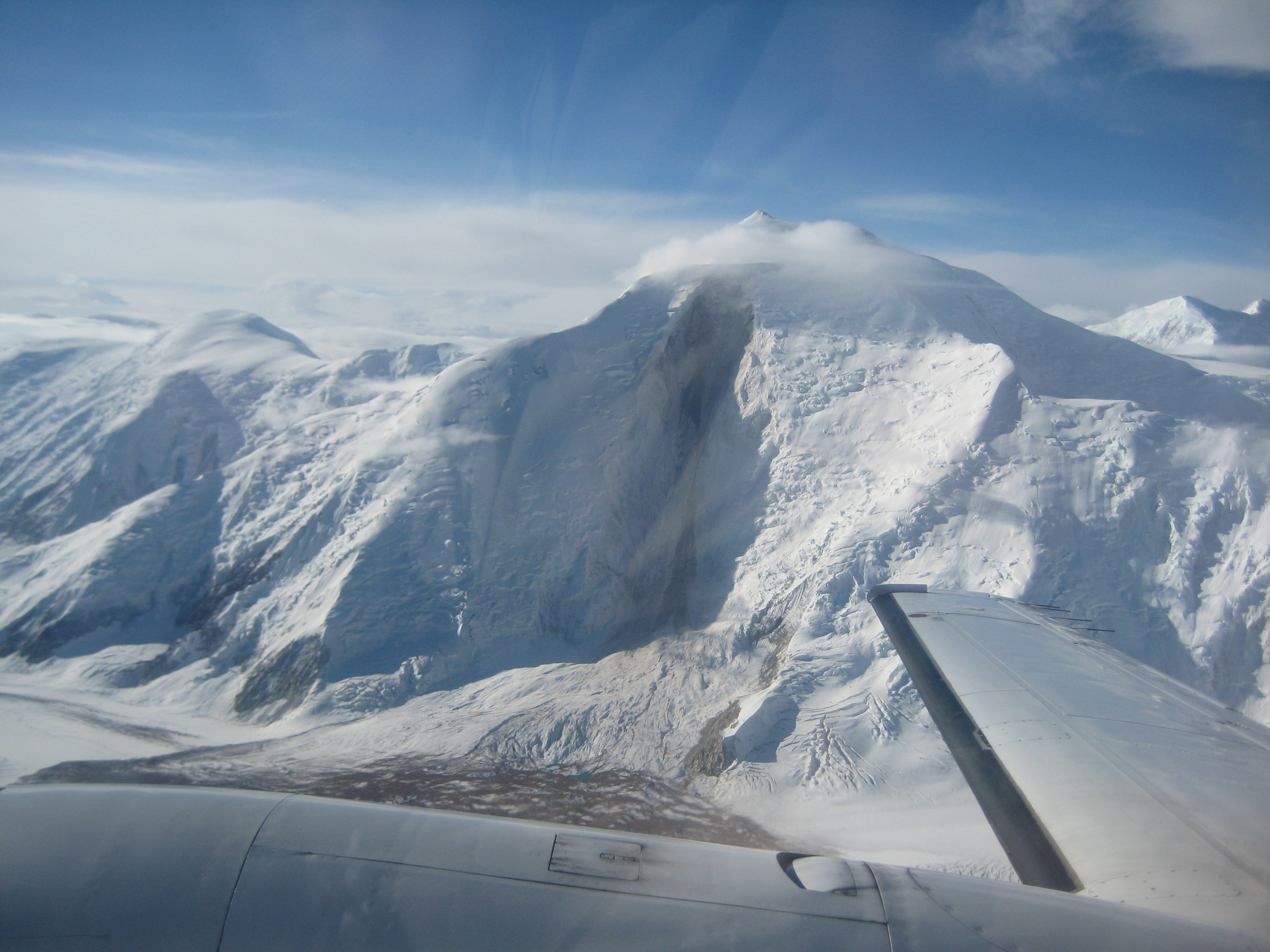
5. Mount Steele in Yukon is the fifth-highest summit of Canada.

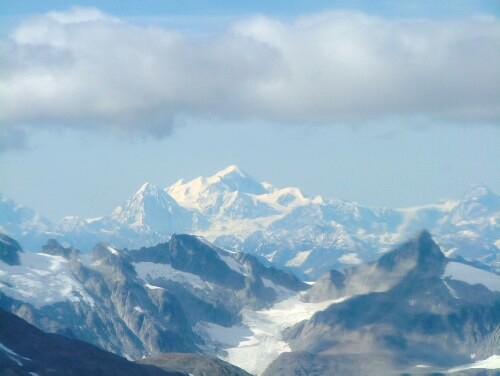
9. Mount Fairweather on the Alaska border is the highest summit of British Columbia.

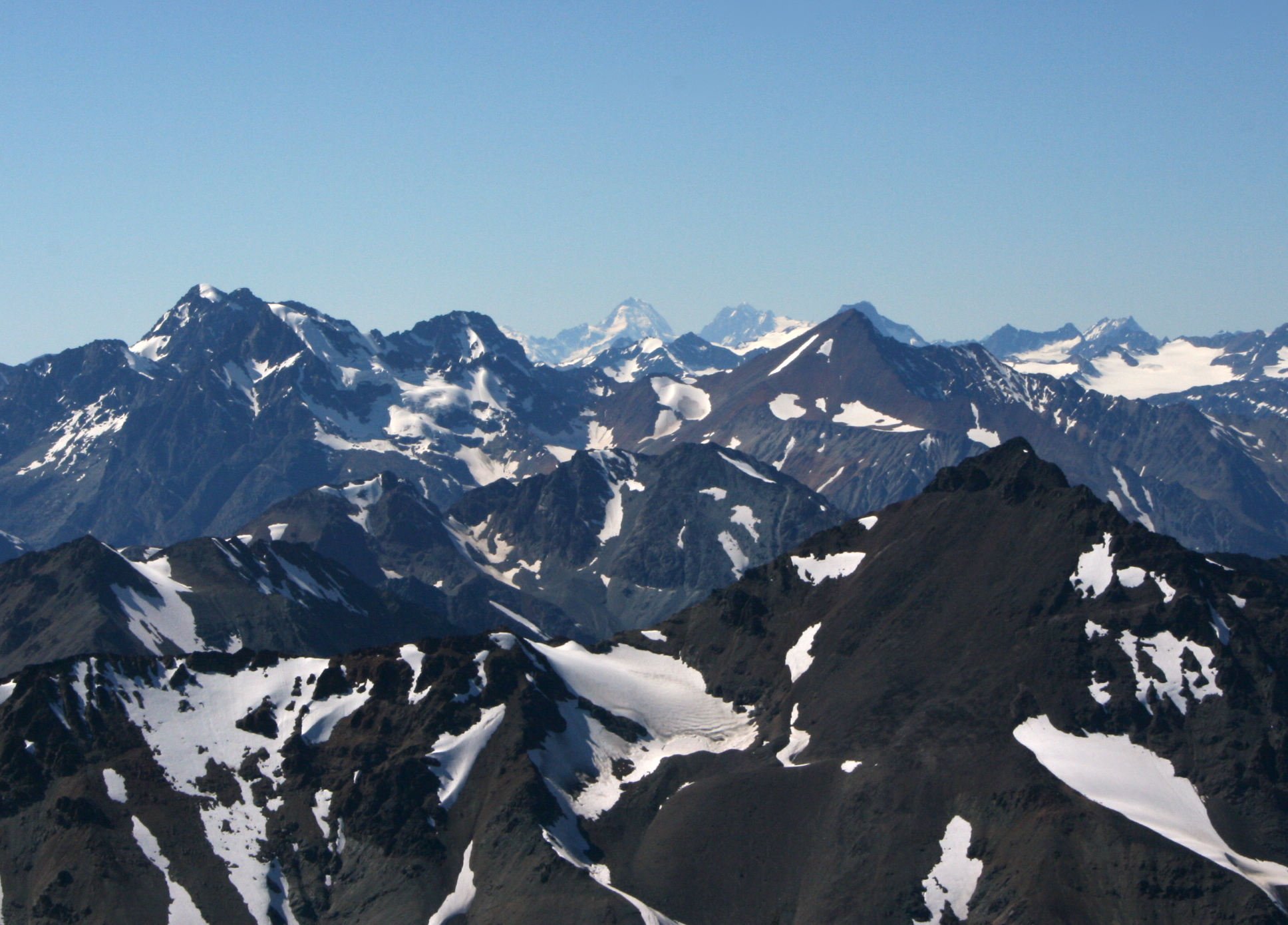
19. Mount Waddington is the highest summit of the Coast Mountains of British Columbia.

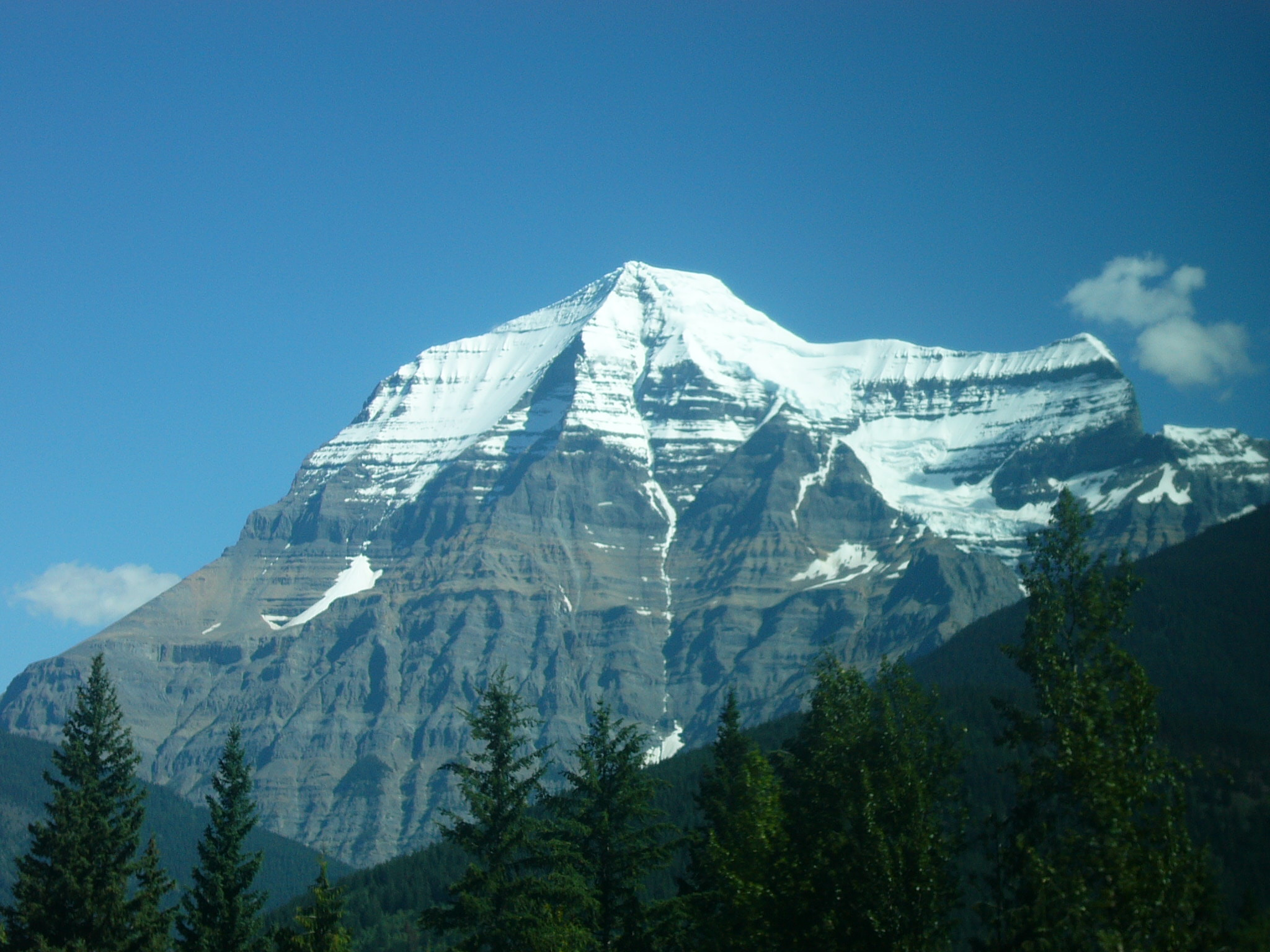
21. Mount Robson in British Columbia is the highest summit of the Canadian Rockies.

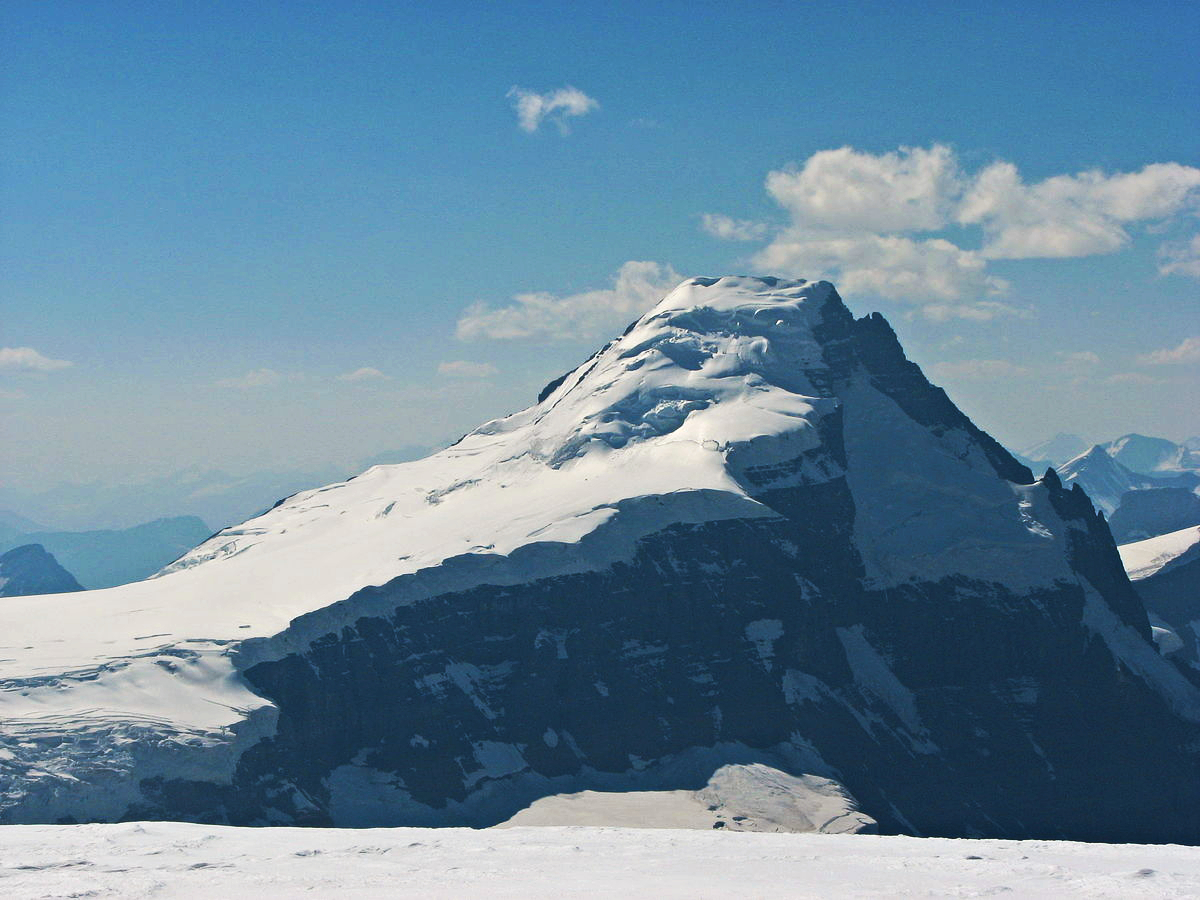
28. Mount Columbia on the British Columbia border is the highest summit of Alberta.

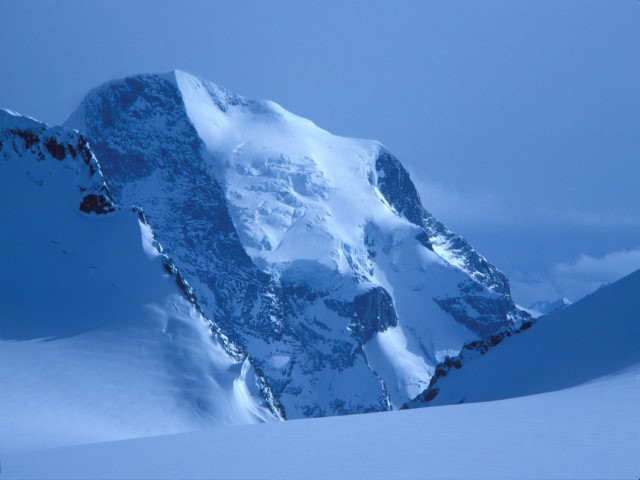
40. Mount Sir Sandford is the highest summit of the Sir Sandford Range of British Columbia.

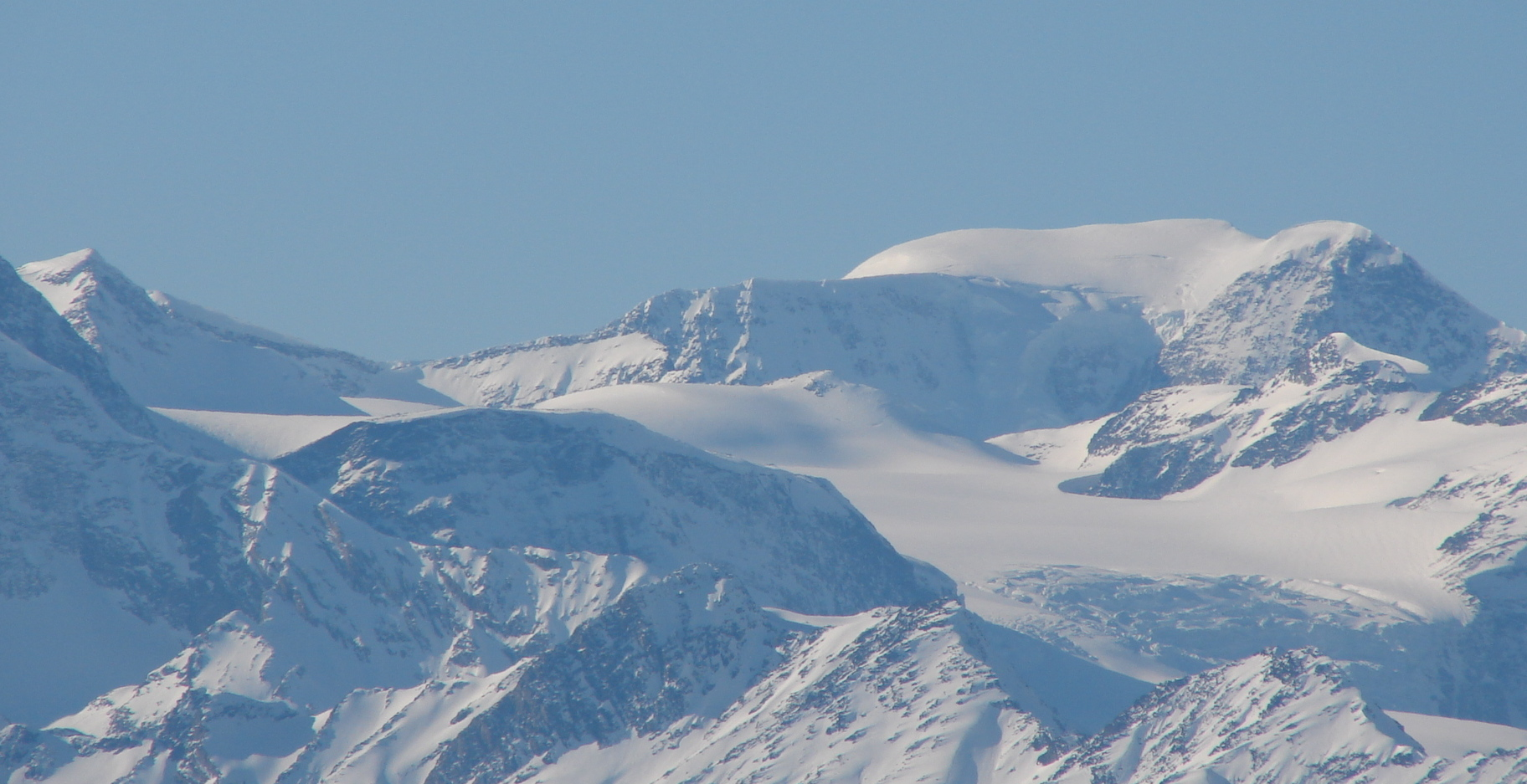
41. Mount Sir Wilfrid Laurier is the highest summit of the Cariboo Mountains of British Columbia.

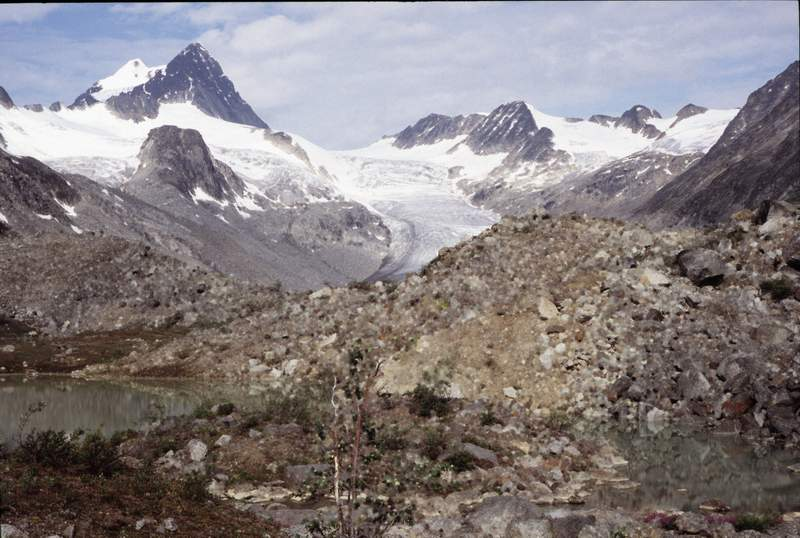
73. Keele Peak is the highest summit of the Mackenzie Mountains of Yukon.

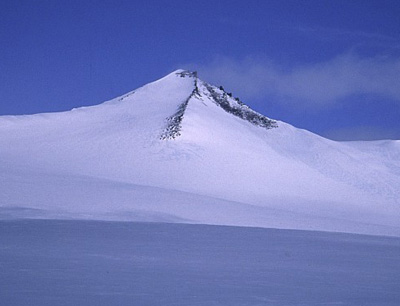
105. Barbeau Peak is the highest summit of Ellesmere Island and Nunavut.

== See also ==
- List of mountain peaks of North America
  - List of mountain peaks of Greenland
  - List of mountain peaks of Canada
  - List of highest points of Canadian provinces and territories
    - List of the highest major summits of Canada
      - List of the major 4000-metre summits of Canada
    - List of the most prominent summits of Canada
    - List of the most isolated major summits of Canada
    - List of extreme summits of Canada
  - List of mountain peaks of the Rocky Mountains
  - List of mountain peaks of the United States
  - List of mountain peaks of México
  - List of mountain peaks of Central America
  - List of mountain peaks of the Caribbean
- Canada
  - Geography of Canada
    - Category:Mountains of Canada
      - commons:Category:Mountains of Canada
- Physical geography
  - Topography
    - Topographic elevation
    - Topographic prominence
    - Topographic isolation
