= Mount Slaggard =

Mountain in Yukon, Canada

Highest point
- Elevation: 4,742 m (15,558 ft)
- Prominence: 522 m (1,713 ft)
- Listing: North America highest peaks 16th; Canada highest major peaks 9th
- Coordinates: 61°10′22″N 140°35′06″W

Geography
- Location: Yukon, Canada
- Parent range: Saint Elias Mountains
- Topo map: NTS 115F2 Mount Macaulay

Climbing
- First ascent: 1959
- Easiest route: Glacier/snow/ice climb

Mount Slaggard is the tenth highest peak in Canada and is located in Kluane National Park and Reserve.

== See also ==
- List of mountain peaks of North America
  - Mountain peaks of Canada
