= Avalanche Peak (Yukon) =

Mountain in Yukon, Canada

- Location within Yukon Location within Canada

Highest point
- Elevation: 4,228 m (13,871 ft)
- Prominence: 608 m (1,995 ft)
- Listing: Mountains of Yukon 20th; North America highest peaks 67th; Canada highest major peaks 19th
- Coordinates: 61°14′24″N 140°45′32″W

Geography
- Location: Yukon, Canada
- Parent range: Saint Elias Mountains
- Topo map: NTS 115F2 Mount Macaulay

Climbing
- First ascent: 1969

Avalanche Peak is the 20th highest peak in the Yukon territory of Canada.

== See also ==
- List of mountain peaks of North America
  - Mountain peaks of Canada
