= Mount King =

Mount King may refer to:

- Mount King (Antarctica), a mountain in the Tula Mountains
- Mount King (British Columbia), a summit in the Canadian Rockies
- King Peak (Yukon), also called Mount King, a mountain in Canada
- Parish of Mount King, a civil parish of Poole County, New South Wales, Australia

== See also ==
- Mount King Albert, in Alberta and British Columbia, Canada
- Mount King Edward, in Alberta and British Columbia, Canada
- Mount King George, in Yukon Territory, Canada
- Mount King George (British Columbia), in British Columbia, Canada
- Mount King William, in Tasmania, Australia
- King Peak (disambiguation)
- Kings Peak (disambiguation)
