= Mount Strickland =

Mountain in Yukon, Canada

Highest point
- Elevation: 4,260 m (13,980 ft)
- Prominence: 800 m (2,600 ft)
- Listing: North America highest peaks 64th; Canada highest major peaks 15th
- Coordinates: 61°14′08″N 140°40′30″W

Geography
- Location: Yukon, Canada
- Parent range: Saint Elias Mountains
- Topo map: NTS 115F2 Mount Macaulay

Climbing
- First ascent: 1959
- Easiest route: Glacier/snow/ice climb

Mount Strickland is a mountain in the Saint Elias Mountains of Yukon, Canada. The Mountain takes its name from Charles W. Strickland (1935–1983), a refuge Manager of the Kodiak National Wildlife Refuge.

== See also ==
- List of mountain peaks of North America
  - List of mountain peaks of Canada
