= Mount Malaspina =

Mountain in Yukon, Canada

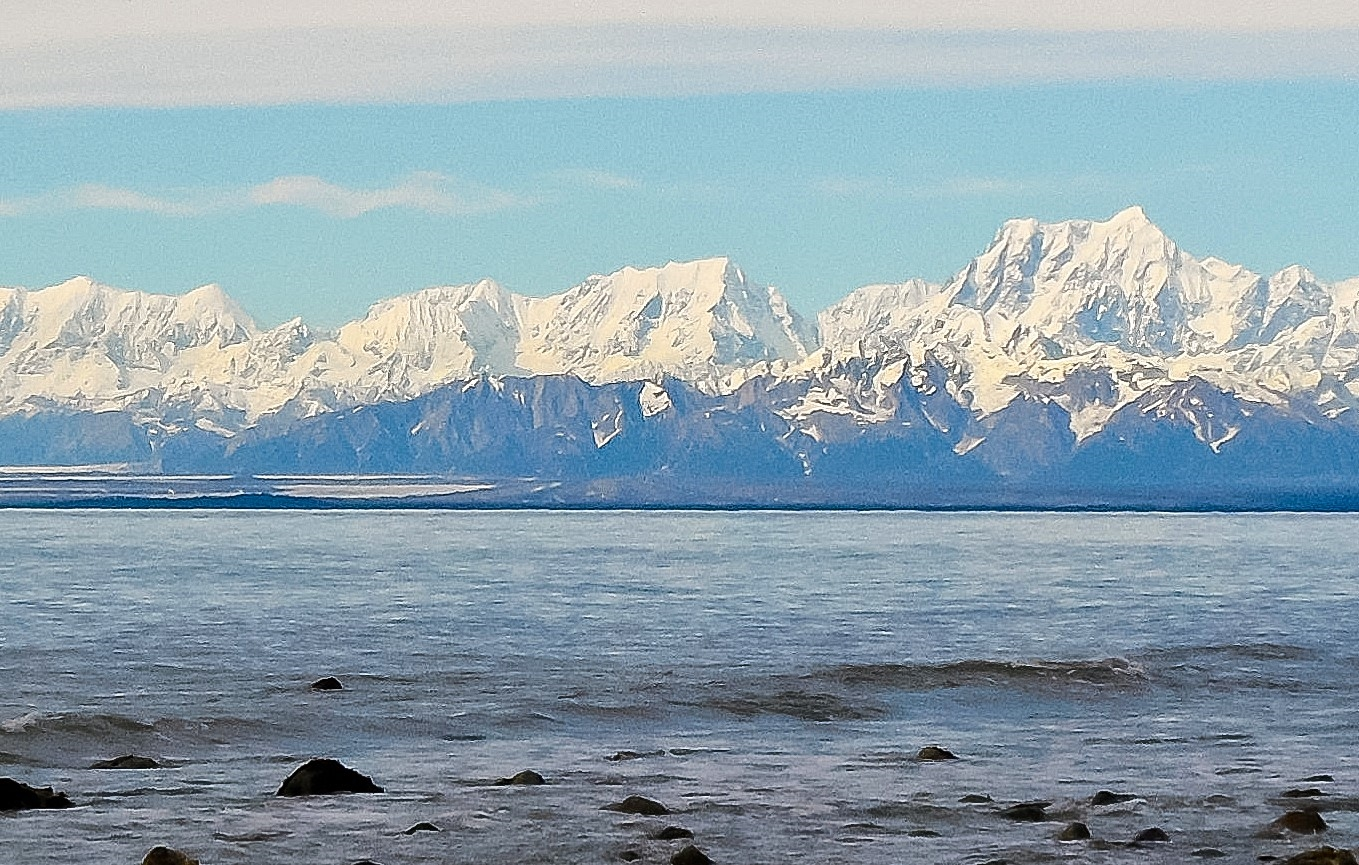
- Mt. Malaspina centered, southeast aspect (Mt. Augusta to right)

Highest point
- Elevation: 3,776 m (12,388 ft)
- Prominence: 896 m (2,940 ft)
- Parent peak: Mount Augusta (4,289 m)
- Isolation: 6.39 km (3.97 mi)
- Listing: North America highest peaks Highest major summits of Canada; Mountain peaks of Canada
- Coordinates: 60°19′06″N 140°34′28″W

Geography
- Location within Yukon
- Interactive map of Mount Malaspina
- Country: Canada
- Territory: Yukon
- Protected area: Kluane National Park
- Parent range: Saint Elias Mountains
- Topo map: NTS 115C7 Newton Glacier

Climbing
- First ascent: 2015
- Easiest route: Expedition climbing

Mount Malaspina is a 3,776-metre (12,388-foot) mountain summit in Yukon, Canada.

== Description ==
Mount Malaspina is part of the Saint Elias Mountains in Kluane National Park where it ranks as the 31st-highest summit in Canada. The remote mountain is highly glaciated and surrounded by the Seward Glacier, Newton Glacier, Agassiz Glacier, and Malaspina Glacier. The nearest higher peak is Mount Augusta, 6.39 km (3.97 mi) to the east, and Mount Logan is 29 km (18 mi) to the north. Topographic relief is significant as the summit rises approximately 2,200 metres (7,218 ft) above the head of the Agassiz Glacier in 3 km (1.9 mi).

== History ==
The mountain is named in association with Malaspina Glacier which is named in honor of Alessandro Malaspina, an Italian navigator and explorer in the service of Spain, whose Malaspina Expedition visited this region in 1791. The mountain's toponym was officially adopted in 1981 by the Geographical Names Board of Canada.

The first ascent of the summit was made on August 15, 2015, by Camilo Rada (from Chile) and Natalia Martinez (from Argentina) via the North Face and East Ridge. At that time the peak held the distinction of "highest unclimbed officially-named mountain of North America."

== Climate ==
Based on the Köppen climate classification, Mount Malaspina is located in a tundra climate zone with long, cold, snowy winters, and cool summers. Weather systems coming off the Gulf of Alaska are forced upwards by the Saint Elias Mountains (orographic lift), causing heavy precipitation in the form of rainfall and snowfall. Winter temperatures can drop below -10 °C with wind chill factors below −30 °C. This climate supports immense glaciers surrounding this mountain. The months May through June offer the most favorable weather for climbing or viewing.

== Gallery ==
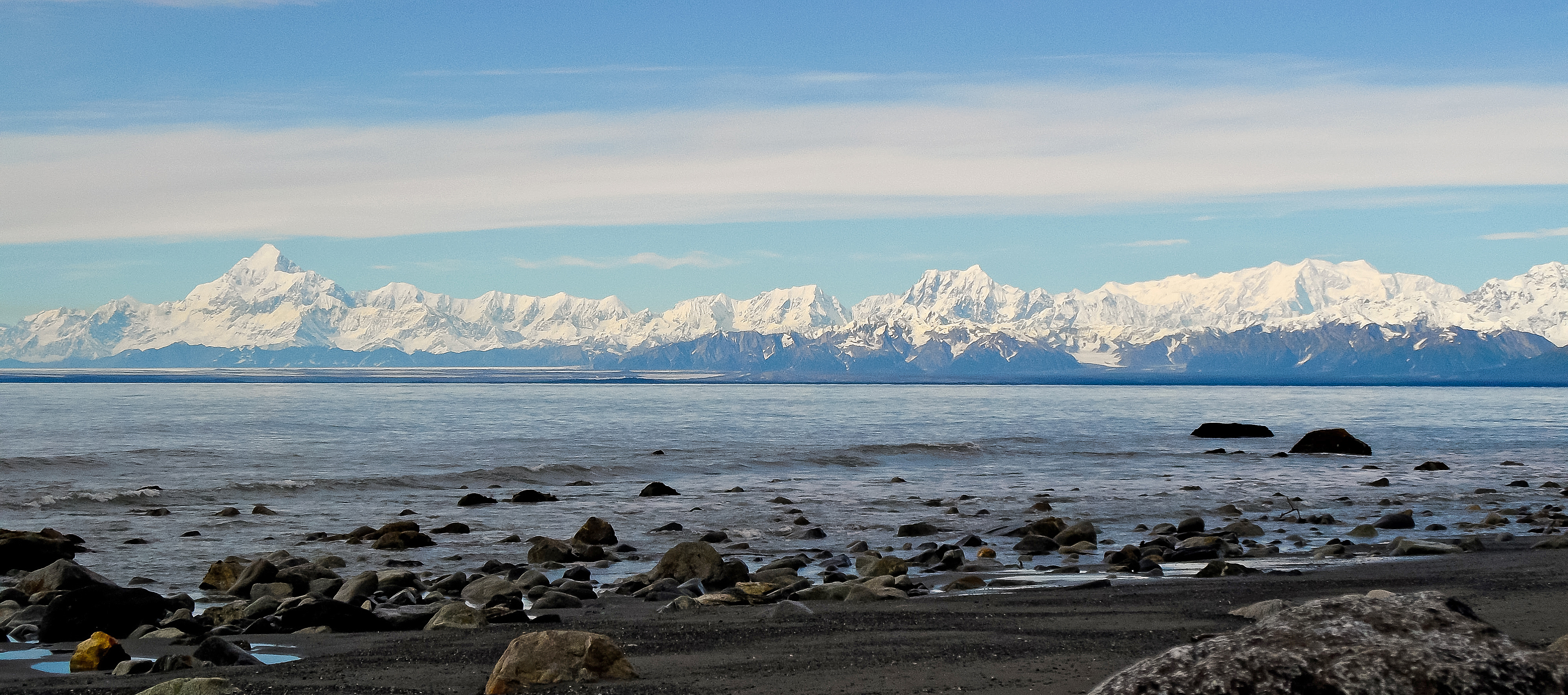
Saint Elias Mountains across Yakutat Bay.
L→R: Mt. Saint Elias, Mt. Malaspina (center), Mt. Augusta, Mount Logan

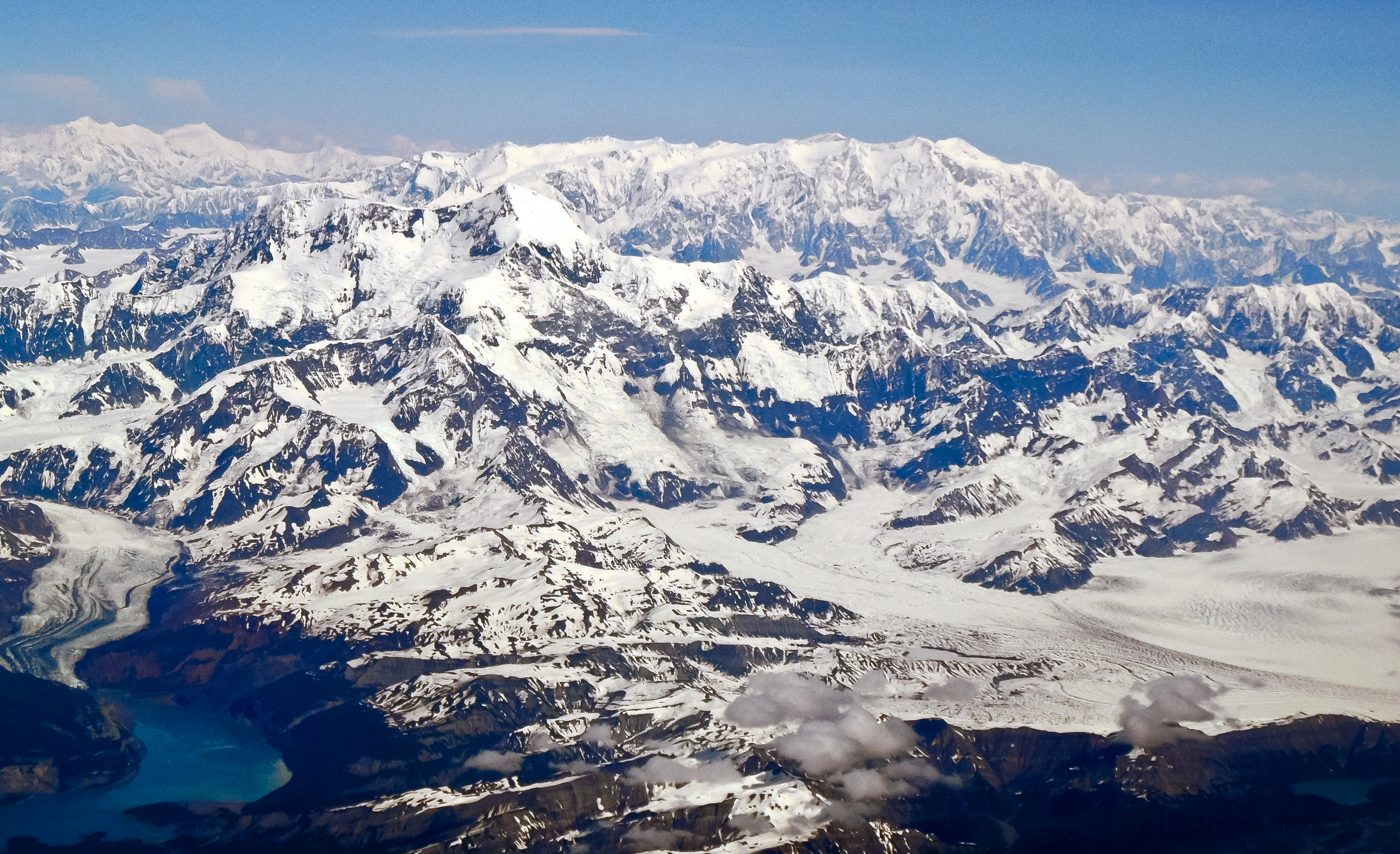
Aerial view of Saint Elias Mountains with camera pointed northeast. Mt. Saint Elias left of center, Mt. Logan center top, Mount Malaspina on right edge.

== See also ==
- List of the highest major summits of Canada
- Geography of Yukon
