= Mount Wood (Yukon) =

Mountain in Yukon, Canada

Highest point
- Elevation: 4,850 m (15,910 ft)
- Prominence: 1,190 m (3,900 ft)
- Parent peak: Mount Steele (5073 m)
- Listing: North America highest peaks 14th; Canada highest major peaks 6th
- Coordinates: 61°13′58″N 140°30′45″W

Geography
- Country: Canada
- Territory: Yukon
- Parent range: Saint Elias Mountains
- Topo map: NTS 115F2 Mount Macaulay

Climbing
- First ascent: 25 July 1941 by Walter Wood Jr., Anderson Blakewell and Albert Jackman
- Easiest route: Glacier/snow/ice climb

Mount Wood (sometimes referred to as Wood Peak) is the seventh-highest mountain in Canada and is located in Kluane National Park and Reserve. In 1900 it was named by the surveyor James J. McArthur (1856–1925) after Zachary Taylor Wood (d.1915), a North-West Mounted Police inspector in Dawson during the Klondike Gold Rush. He was later the commissioner of the NWMP.

== See also ==
- List of mountain peaks of North America
  - List of mountain peaks of Canada
