= King Peak =

King Peak may refer to several places:

- King Peak (Antarctica)
- King Peak (British Columbia), Canada
- King Peak (Yukon), Canada
- King Peak (California), United States
- King Peak (Nevada), United States

== See also ==
- Storm King Peak, in the Needle Mountains, Colorado, United States
- Silver King Peak (disambiguation)
- Kings Peak (disambiguation)
- Mount King (disambiguation)
