= Mount Queen Mary =

Mountain in Destruction Bay, Yukon, Canada

Highest point
- Elevation: 3,928 m (12,887 ft)
- Prominence: 1,338 m (4,390 ft)
- Listing: Canada highest major peaks 23rd
- Coordinates: 60°37′41″N 139°43′26″W

Geography
- Location: Yukon, Canada
- Parent range: Saint Elias Mountains
- Topo map: NTS 115B12 Mount Queen Mary

Climbing
- First ascent: 1961

Mount Queen Mary is located 85 km (53 mi) southwest of Destruction Bay, Yukon. The mountain was named in 1935, along with the nearby (6 km away) Mount King George, for George V’s and Queen Mary's silver jubilee, or 25 years of rule.

Although large, the mountain has easy angle aspects, in particular from the north. The first ascent took place in 1961, when a seven-person team from Seattle climbed the northeast ridge. The west ridge was first climbed in 1978 by a Canadian team including a dog. Several other ascents of the peak have been made, but largely from the north and west sides of the mountain.

== See also ==
- Mountain peaks of Canada
- Mountain peaks of North America
