= Kings Peak =

Kings Peak may refer to:

- Kings Peak (British Columbia), a mountain in British Columbia, Canada
- Kings Peak (Idaho), a mountain in the Clearwater Mountains range in Benewah County, Idaho, United States
- Kings Peak (Utah), a mountain in the Uinta Mountains range in Duchesne County, Utah, United States, and the highest point in the state

== See also ==
- South Kings Peak, Utah, United States
- King Peak (disambiguation)
- Mount King (disambiguation)
