= Mount Sir Alexander =

Mountain in British Columbia, Canada

- Mount Kitchi
- Location within British Columbia Location within Canada

Highest point
- Elevation: 3,275 m (10,745 ft)
- Prominence: 1,762 m (5,781 ft)
- Parent peak: Mount Chown
- Isolation: 87.73 km (54.51 mi) to Mount Chown
- Listing: Mountains of British Columbia; Ultras of North America 178th; Ultras of Canada 64th; Ultras of the Rocky Mountains 13th; Most Isolated Major Summits of Canada 54th
- Coordinates: 53°56′09″N 120°23′11″W

Geography
- Country: Canada
- Province: British Columbia
- Region: Robson Valley
- District: Cariboo Land District
- Protected area: Kakwa Provincial Park
- Parent range: Continental Ranges
- Topo map: NTS 93H16 Mount Sir Alexander

Climbing
- First ascent: 1929 Andrew Gilmour
- Easiest route: Southwest Ridge

Mount Sir Alexander, is a 3,275-metre (10,745 ft), ultra-prominent mountain in the Sir Alexander Area of the Continental Ranges (sometimes referred to as the Northern Continental Ranges), Canadian Rockies located in British Columbia.

Located within Kakwa Provincial Park & Protected Area, Mount Sir Alexander is the most northern peak over 3,200-metres (10,500-feet) in the Rocky Mountains. Originally named Mt. Kitchi, the mountain was renamed Sir Alexander in 1917 in honour of Sir Alexander Mackenzie, who was the first European to cross North America in 1793. Mackenzie and his party passed within 80 km of the mountain, although he likely never saw it as he was travelling along the Fraser River, well below peak visibility.
