= McArthur Peak =

Mountain in Yukon, Canada

Highest point
- Elevation: 4,344 m (14,252 ft)
- Prominence: 924 m (3,031 ft)
- Listing: North America highest peaks 32nd; Canada highest major peaks 13th
- Coordinates: 60°36′24″N 140°12′51″W

Geography
- Location: Yukon, Canada
- Parent range: Saint Elias Mountains
- Topo map: NTS 115C9 McArthur Peak

Climbing
- First ascent: 1961
- Easiest route: glacier/snow/ice climb

McArthur Peak is a peak in the Saint Elias Mountains of Yukon, Canada. The peak, 13th highest in Canada, sits 11 km NE of Mount Logan, the highest mountain in Canada. A secondary peak two kilometres to the east is known as McArthur East. The peak was named for James Joseph McArthur, a Dominion Land Surveyor who also made the first ascent of a Canadian peak over 10,000 ft (3,000 m), Mount Stephen in 1887.

The first ascent was made on August 4, 1961, from the Hubbard Glacier up the north ridge by Barbara Lilley, Alexander McDermott, Donald Monk, Seymour Ossofsky, George Wallerstein.

== See also ==
- List of mountain peaks of North America
  - List of mountain peaks of Canada
