= Mount Walsh =

Mountain in British Columbia, Canada

Highest point
- Elevation: 4,507 m (14,787 ft)
- Prominence: 1,646 m (5,400 ft)
- Listing: North America highest peaks 21st; Canada highest major peaks 11th
- Coordinates: 61°00′N 140°01′W

Geography
- Location: Yukon, Canada
- Parent range: Saint Elias Mountains
- Topo map: NTS 115F1 Mount Steele

Climbing
- Easiest route: Glacier/snow/ice climb

Mount Walsh is a mountain in Kluane National Park and Reserve in Yukon, Canada.

The peak was named after a RCMP superintendent for the Yukon Territory, James Morrow Walsh.

== See also ==
- List of mountain peaks of North America
  - List of mountain peaks of Canada
