= Edgegrain Mountain =

Mountain in British Columbia, Canada

- Location within British Columbia
- Interactive map of Edgegrain Mountain

Highest point
- Elevation: 2,055 m (6,742 ft)
- Coordinates: 54°02′00″N 120°21′00″W

Edgegrain Mountain is a mountain in the Continental Ranges of British Columbia, Canada, located between the headwaters of Jarvis and Kitchi Creeks. The name was adopted in 1965 and was given in relation to its strata of sedimentary rock being tilted nearly at a right angle. Its closest neighbour is Mount Ida.
