= Mount King George =

Mountain in Yukon, Canada

- Location within Yukon

Highest point
- Elevation: 3,741 m (12,274 ft)
- Prominence: 1,281 m (4,203 ft)
- Listing: Canada highest major peaks 29th
- Coordinates: 60°31′53″N 139°47′03″W

Geography
- Country: Canada
- Territory: Yukon
- Protected area: Kluane National Park and Reserve
- Parent range: Saint Elias Mountains
- Topo map: NTS 115B12 Mount Queen Mary

Climbing
- First ascent: April 8, 1965

Mount King George is located in Kluane National Park and Reserve within Yukon, Canada. The mountain was named in 1935, along with the nearby Mount Queen Mary, for George V’s and Queen Mary's silver jubilee, or 25 years of rule.

The mountain's first published ascent was in 1965 via the southwest ridge. The results of a 1996 expedition to Mount King George have been published.

== See also ==
- Mountain peaks of Canada
- List of mountain peaks of North America
