= Whitehorn Mountain (British Columbia) =

Mountain in British Columbia, Canada

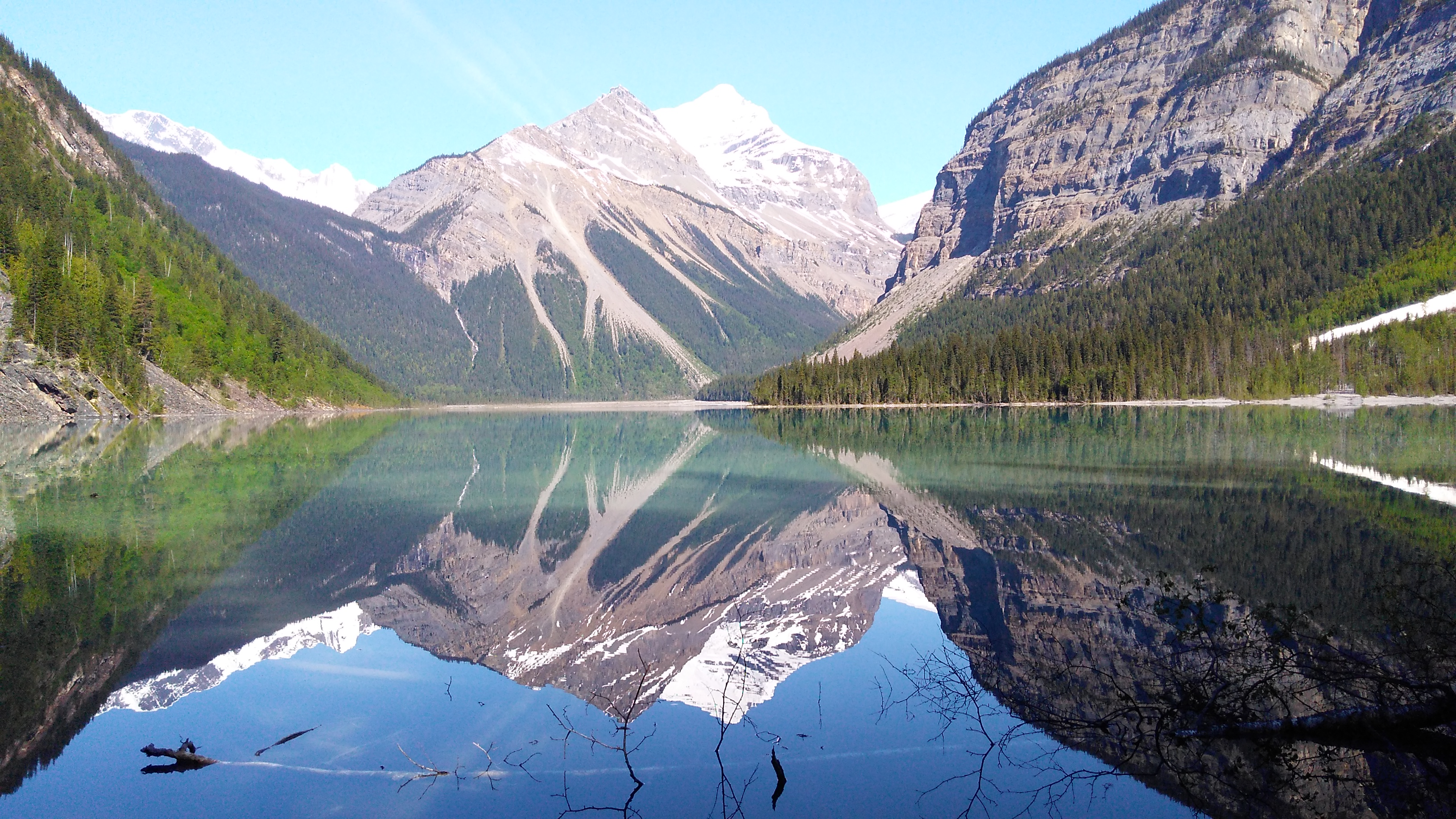
- Whitehorn Mountain reflected in Kinney Lake

Highest point
- Elevation: 3,399 m (11,152 ft)
- Prominence: 1,747 m (5,732 ft)
- Listing: Mountains of British Columbia; Canada highest major peaks 46th; Canada prominent peaks 68th
- Coordinates: 53°08′13″N 119°16′00″W

Geography
- Location within British Columbia
- Location: British Columbia, Canada
- Parent range: Park Ranges ← Canadian Rockies
- Topo map: NTS 83E3 Mount Robson

Climbing
- First ascent: August 12, 1911 by Conrad Kain

Whitehorn Mountain is a 3,399-metre (11,152 ft) peak located in eastern British Columbia, Canada near the Alberta border. It is one of British Columbia's 102 ultra prominent peaks.

Whitehorn Mountain was first climbed by Conrad Kain in a rare solo ascent for him. Kain was in the Mount Robson area guiding a reconnaissance party led by Arthur Wheeler in 1911 when he completed the solo ascent, much to the disgruntlement of Wheeler.

== Climate ==
Based on the Köppen climate classification, Whitehorn Mountain is located in a subarctic climate zone with cold, snowy winters, and mild summers. Winter temperatures can drop below -20 °C with wind chill factors below -30 °C.

== Gallery ==
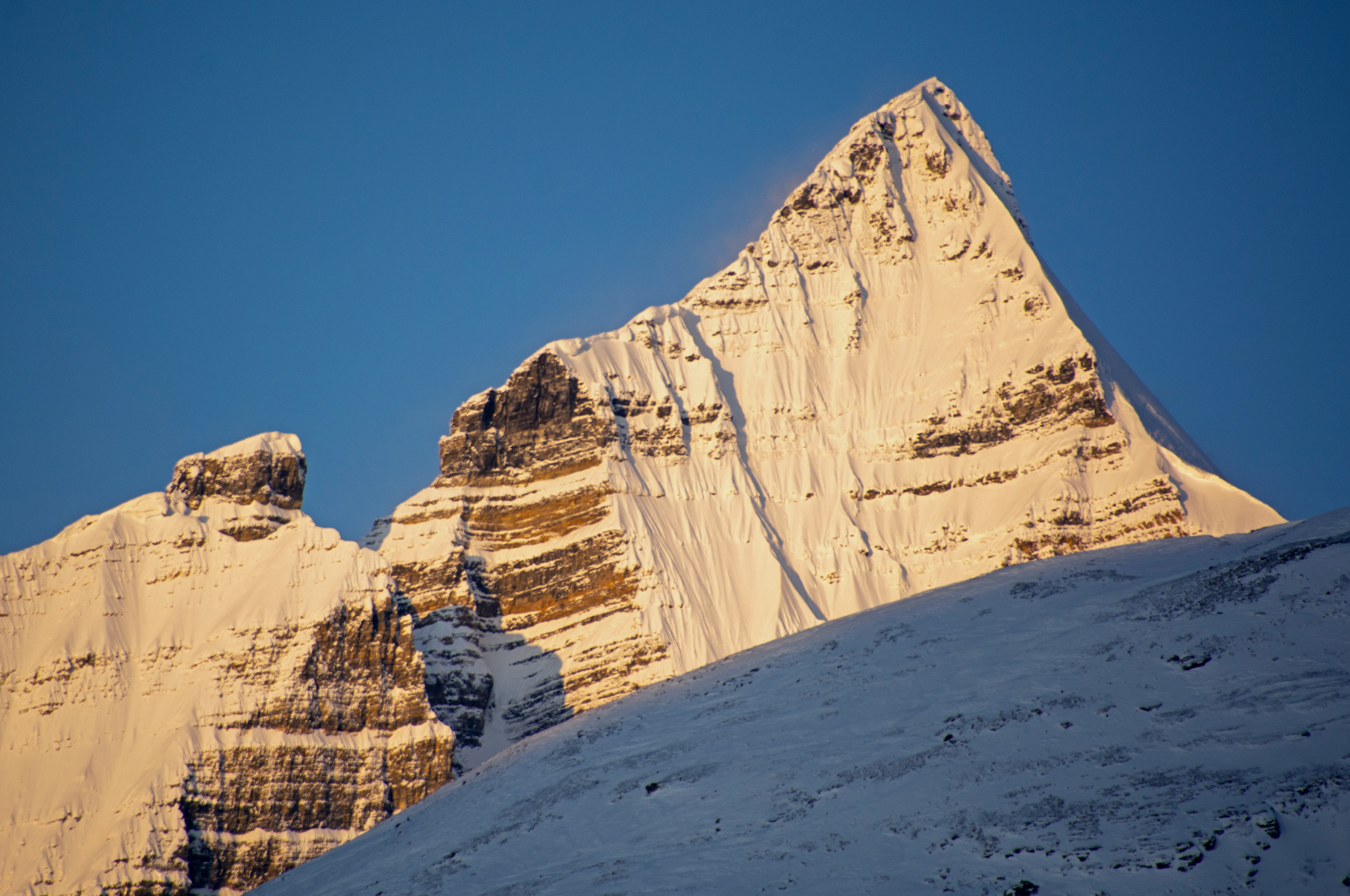
Whitehorn summit

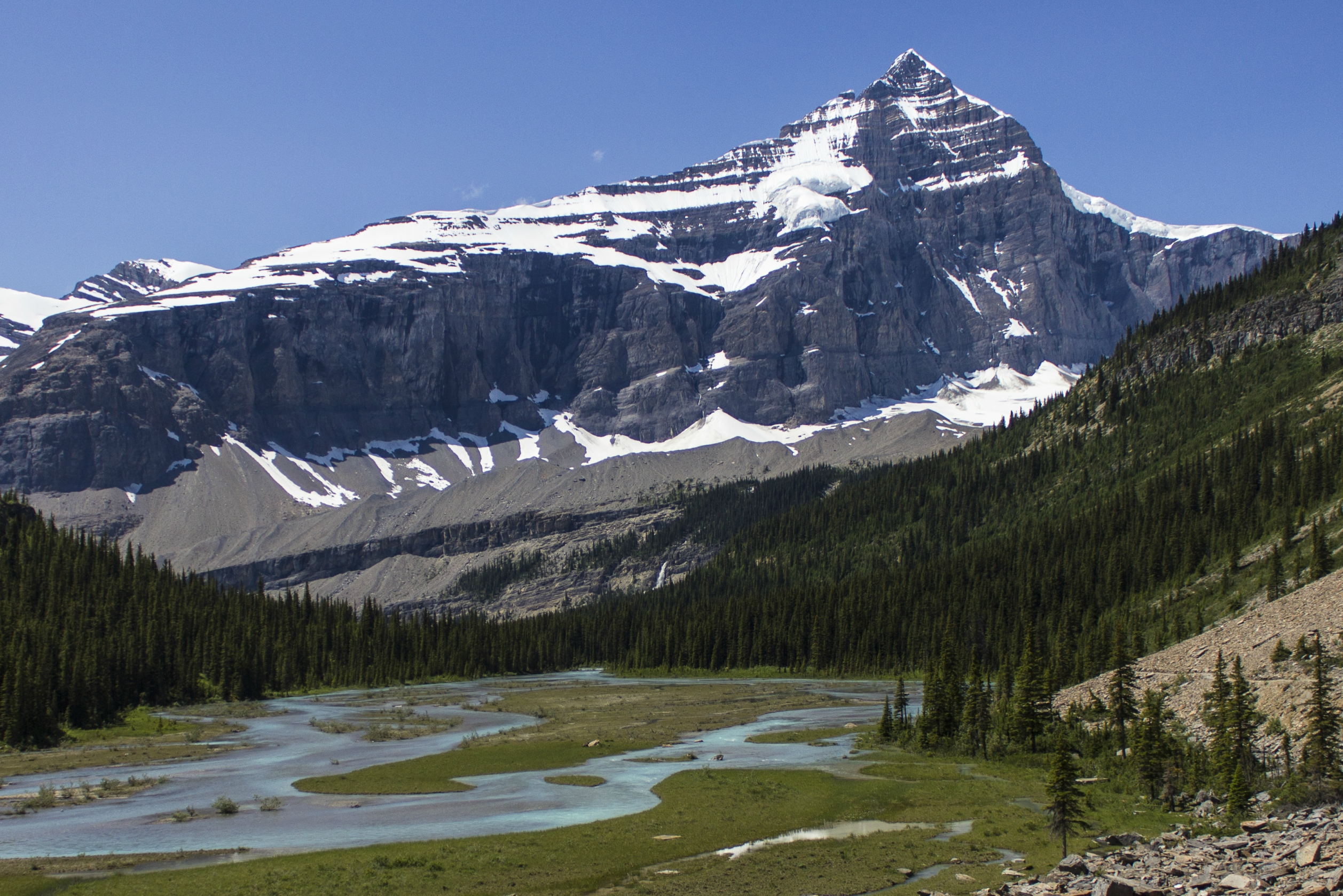
Whitehorn Mountain

== See also ==
- List of Ultras of North America
