= Mount Craig (Yukon) =

Mountain in Yukon, Canada

- Location within Yukon

Highest point
- Elevation: 4,040 m (13,250 ft)
- Prominence: 480 m (1,570 ft)
- Coordinates: 61°15′49″N 140°52′48″W

Geography
- Location: Yukon Territory, Canada
- Parent range: Saint Elias Mountains
- Topo map: NTS 115F7 Mount Constantine

Mount Craig (4,040–4,080 m (13,250–13,390 ft)) is in Kluane National Park and Reserve in Yukon Territory, Canada.
