= Mount Nelson (British Columbia) =

Mountain in British Columbia, Canada

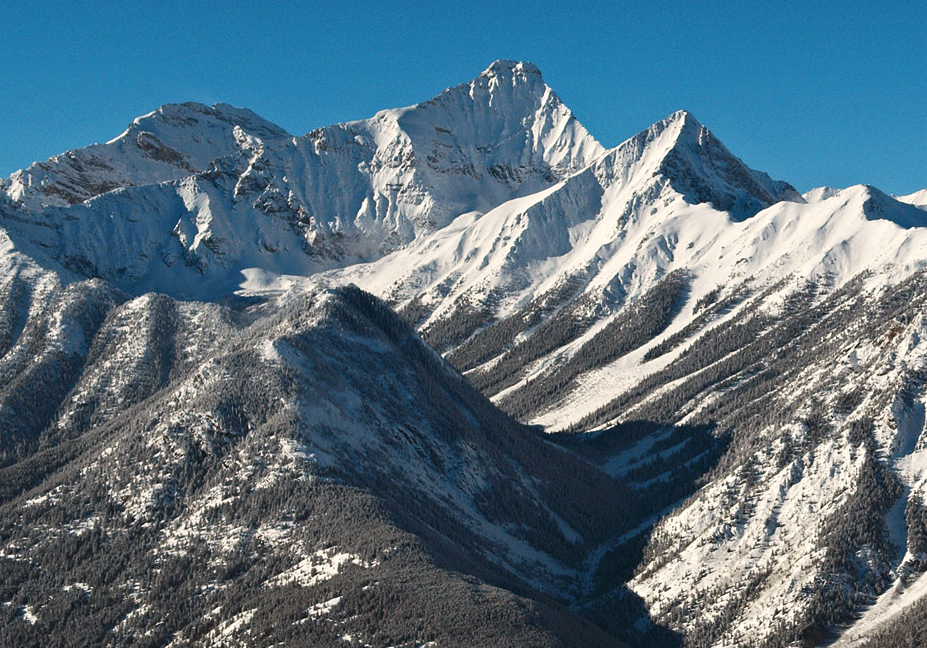
- Mount Nelson

Highest point
- Elevation: 3,313 m (10,869 ft)
- Prominence: 523 m (1,716 ft)
- Listing: Canada highest major peaks 53rd; Mountains of British Columbia
- Coordinates: 50°27′37″N 116°21′6″W

Geography
- Location within British Columbia Location within Canada
- Interactive map of Mount Nelson
- Country: Canada
- Province: British Columbia
- District: Kootenay Land District
- Parent range: Purcell Mountains; Columbia Mountains
- Topo map: NTS 82K8 Toby Creek

Climbing
- First ascent: 1910 by C. D. Ellis
- Easiest route: Trail near Delphine creek to upper basin / summit block scramble

Mount Nelson is a prominent 3,313-metre (10,869-foot) mountain summit located in the Purcell Mountains of southeast British Columbia, Canada. It is situated on the west side of Rocky Mountain Trench, 23 km (14 mi) west of Invermere, and 8 km (5.0 mi) west of Panorama Mountain Resort. Sitting atop the peak is a 5 foot tall aluminum cross that marks the summit and acts as a storage unit for the summit register. It was built and erected in 1986 by the Kloos family out of Invermere, BC.

== History ==
The mountain was named in 1807 by David Thompson after Lord Admiral Nelson (1758–1805) to commemorate the Battle of Trafalgar. The mountain's name was officially adopted March 31, 1924, by the Geographical Names Board of Canada. The first ascent of the peak was made in September 1910 by C. D. Ellis via the south ridge.

== Climate ==
Based on the Köppen climate classification, Mount Nelson is located in a subarctic climate zone with cold, snowy winters, and mild summers. Temperatures can drop below −20 °C with wind chill factors below −30 °C. Precipitation runoff from Mount Nelson drains into tributaries of the Columbia River.

== Climbing Routes ==
Established climbing routes on Mt. Nelson:

- South Ridge - First ascent 1910
- Southwest Ridge - FA 1911
- Southwest Face - FA 1913
- East Ridge - FA 1975

== Gallery ==
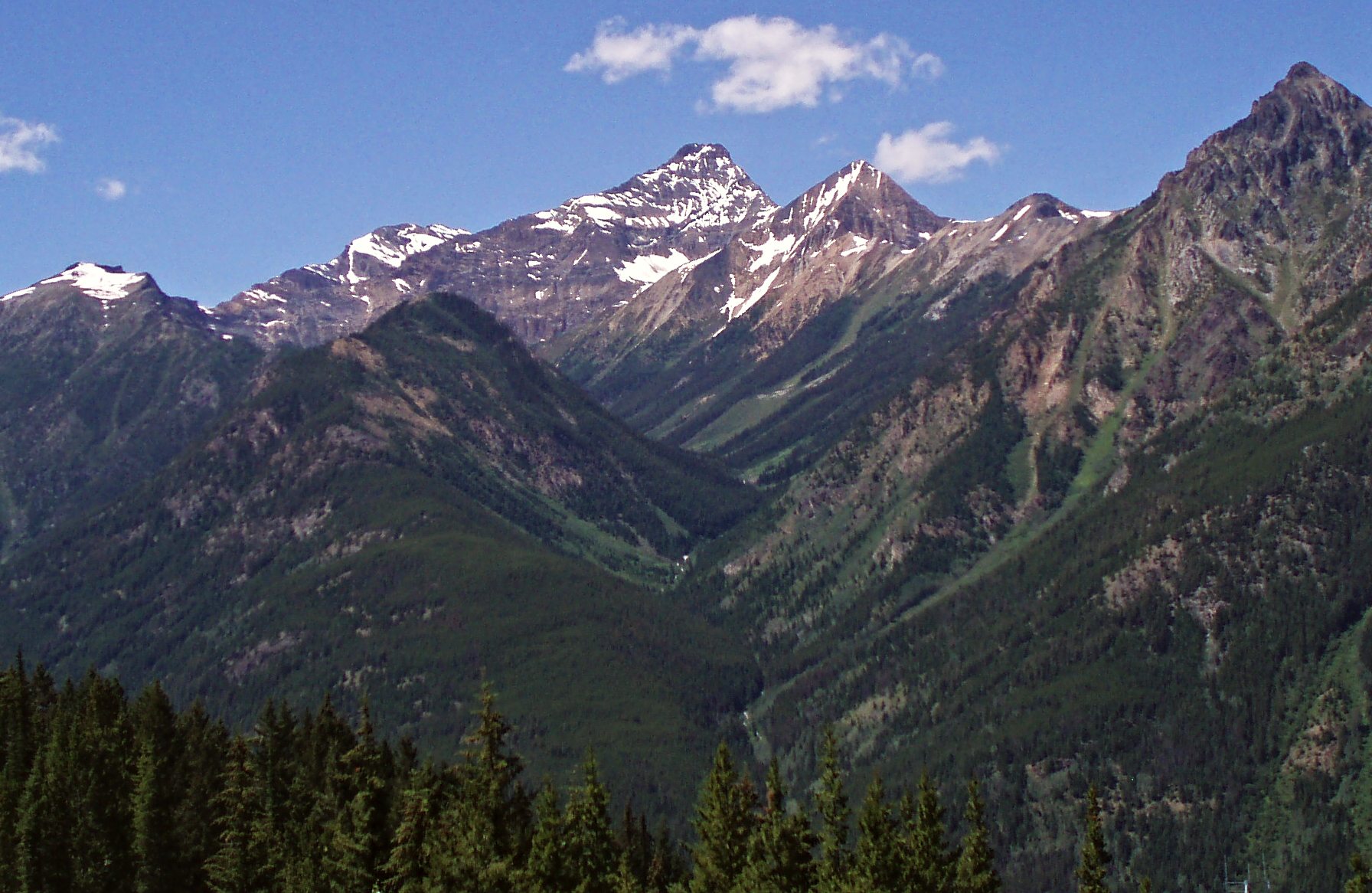
Mt. Nelson

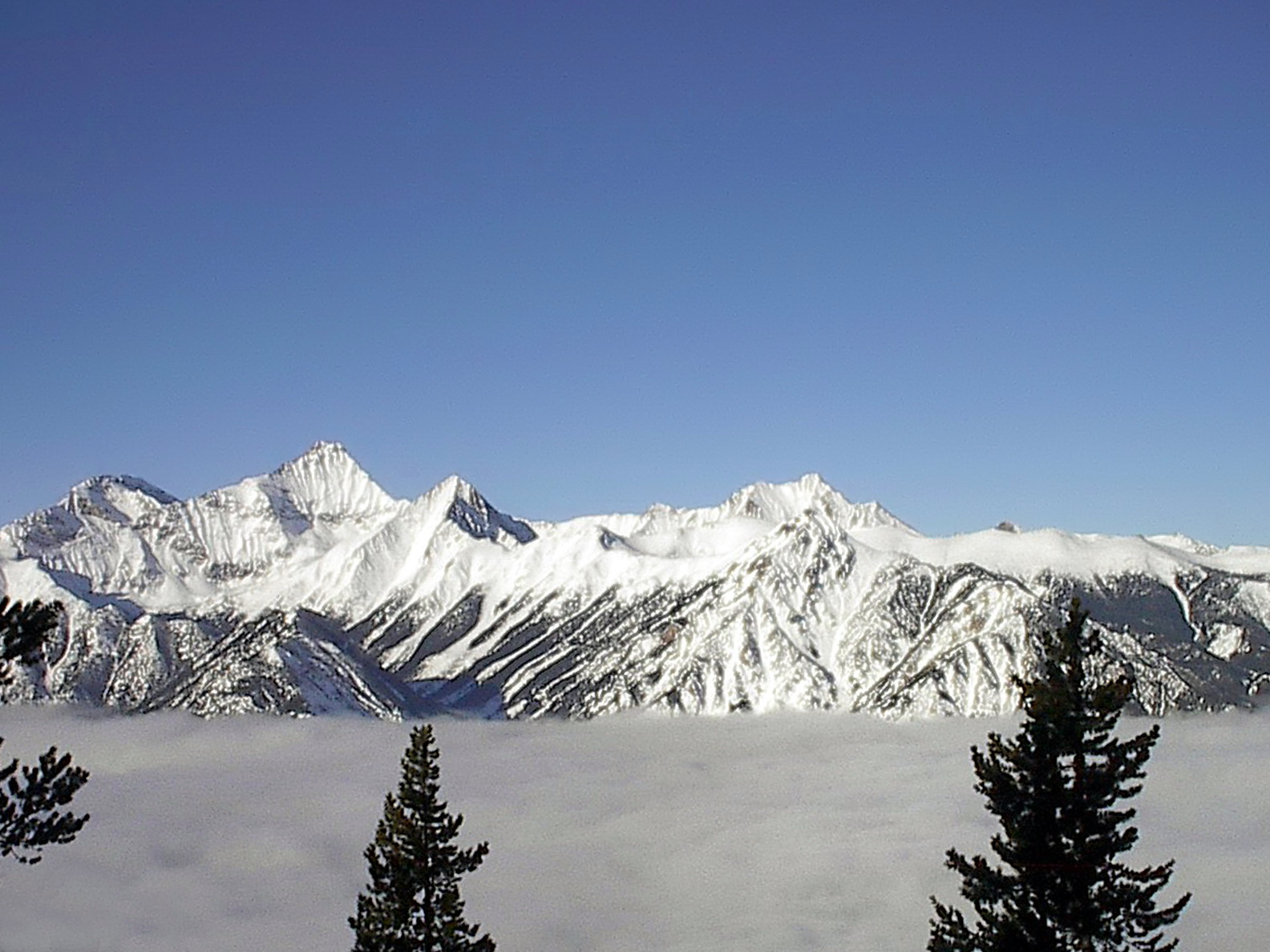
Mount Nelson (left)

== See also ==
- Geography of British Columbia
- Geology of British Columbia
