= King Peak (Yukon) =

Mountain in Canada

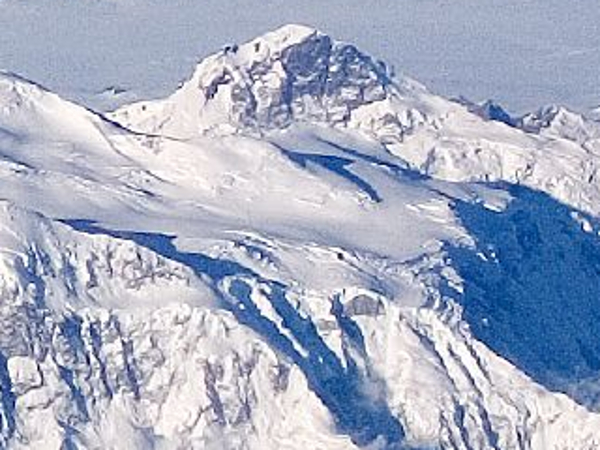
- Aerial view, 2006

Highest point
- Elevation: 5,173 m (16,972 ft)
- Prominence: 1,073 m (3,520 ft)
- Listing: North America highest peaks – 9th; Canada highest major peaks – 4th
- Coordinates: 60°34′59″N 140°39′14″W

Geography
- Location within Yukon
- Location: Yukon, Canada
- Parent range: Saint Elias Mountains
- Topo map: NTS 115C10 King Peak

Climbing
- First ascent: June 6, 1952 by Keith Hart and Elton Thayer
- Easiest route: glacier/snow/ice climb

King Peak (sometimes called Mount King) is the fourth-highest mountain in Canada and the ninth-highest peak in North America. Situated just west of Mount Logan (highest in Canada), in Yukon, it is considered a satellite peak of the massive mountain.

== Climbing history ==
The first ascent of King Peak was made in 1952 by some students from the University of Alaska. Russell Alston Paige, Keith Hart, Elton Thayer and Bill Atwood walked to the Ogilvie Glacier at the foot of Quartz Ridge where the majority of their supplies had been air dropped. They reached Camp 2 on the west ridge on June 3. After waiting two days for a storm to subside, Hart and Thayer set out for the summit while Atwood remained in camp due to a knee injury. After struggling with rock towers and icy crests, they reached the top on June 6, 1952.

The second and third ascents were also completed in 1952 by an American team who had also just made the first ascent of Mount Augusta. From the south side of King Peak, they made their way up to the east ridge occasionally traversing to the north side to avoid steep slopes. After two failed summit attempts on July 20 and 21, Pete Schoening and Gibson Reynolds succeeded in negotiating the gendarme that had rebuffed the failed attempts and reached the top on July 23. Schoening returned the next day with Dick McGowan and Bill Niendorff to complete the third ascent.

== See also ==
- List of mountain peaks of North America
  - List of mountain peaks of Canada

== Bibliography ==
- Scott, Chic (2000). Pushing the Limits: The Story of Canadian Mountaineering. Calgary, Alberta: Rocky Mountain Books. ISBN 0-921102-59-3.
