= Sittakanay Peak =

Mountain in British Columbia

- Location within British Columbia

Highest point
- Elevation: 2,415 m (7,923 ft)
- Prominence: 1,710 m (5,610 ft)
- Isolation: 38.9 km (24.2 mi)
- Listing: List of mountains of British Columbia and List of the most isolated major summits of Canada

Geography
- Location: British Columbia, Canada
- Parent range: Boundary Ranges

Sittakanay Peak is a mountain in the Coast Mountains of northwestern British Columbia. It is located 40 miles east of Juneau, Alaska and 75 miles south of Atlin, British Columbia.
