= Mount Chown =

Mountain in Alberta, Canada

- Location within Alberta

Highest point
- Elevation: 3,316 m (10,879 ft)
- Prominence: 1,746 m (5,728 ft)
- Parent peak: Mount Robson (3959 m)
- Listing: Canada highest major peaks 51st; Canada prominent peaks 69th; Mountains of Alberta
- Coordinates: 53°23′49″N 119°25′03″W

Geography
- Country: Canada
- Province: Alberta
- Parent range: Front Ranges
- Topo map: NTS 83E6 Twintree Lake

Climbing
- First ascent: 1924 G. Hargeaves; W. Putman

Mount Chown is Alberta's 36th highest and 5th most prominent peak. It is named after the Reverend Samuel Dwight Chown. It is located in the northwest corner of Jasper National Park on the border with the Willmore Wilderness Park. It lies between the Chown and Resthaven Glaciers.

== See also ==
- Alberta's Rockies
- List of Ultras of North America
