= Mount Ida (Continental Ranges) =

Mountain in British Columbia, Canada

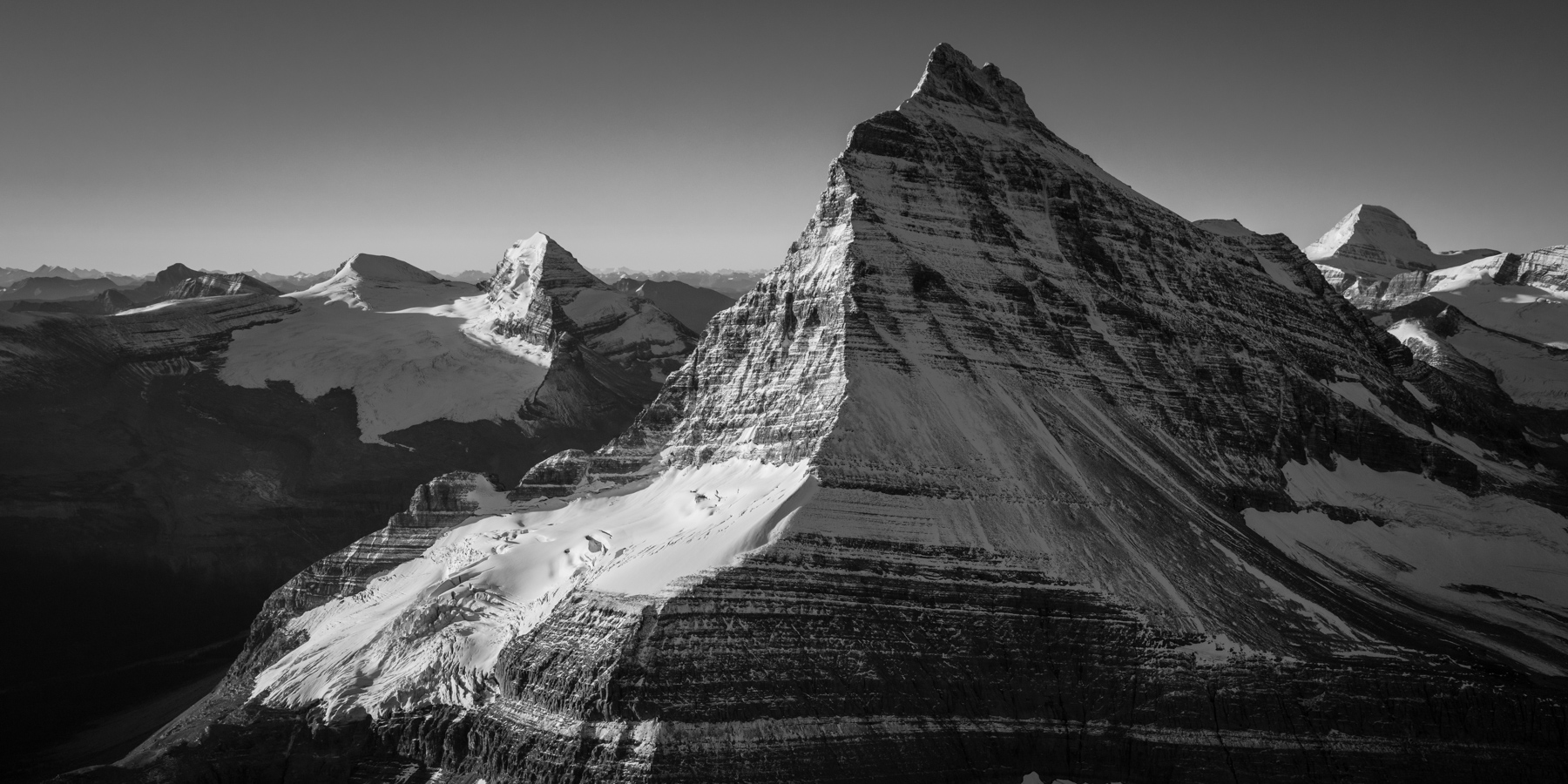
Mount Ida of the Continental Ranges, north aspect

Mount Ida is a 3,192 m (10,472 ft) high mountain of the Continental Ranges located in Kakwa Provincial Park and Protected Area.

The mountain is sometimes called the "Matterhorn of the North" due to its dramatic pyramidal shape and topographic prominence among the surrounding peaks.

Its closest neighbour is Edgegrain Mountain.
