= Kings Peak (Idaho) =

Mountain in Benewah County, Idaho, United States

- Location within Idaho

Highest point
- Elevation: 3,480 ft (1,060 m)
- Coordinates: 47°18′18″N 116°36′20″W

Geography
- Location: Benewah County, Idaho, U.S.
- Topo map: USGS Saint Maries

Climbing
- Easiest route: gravel road

Kings Peak is a mountain in Benewah County, Idaho, United States and is about 1 mile (1.6 km) southwest of the town of St. Maries.
