= Mount Augusta =

Mountain on the Alaska–Yukon border

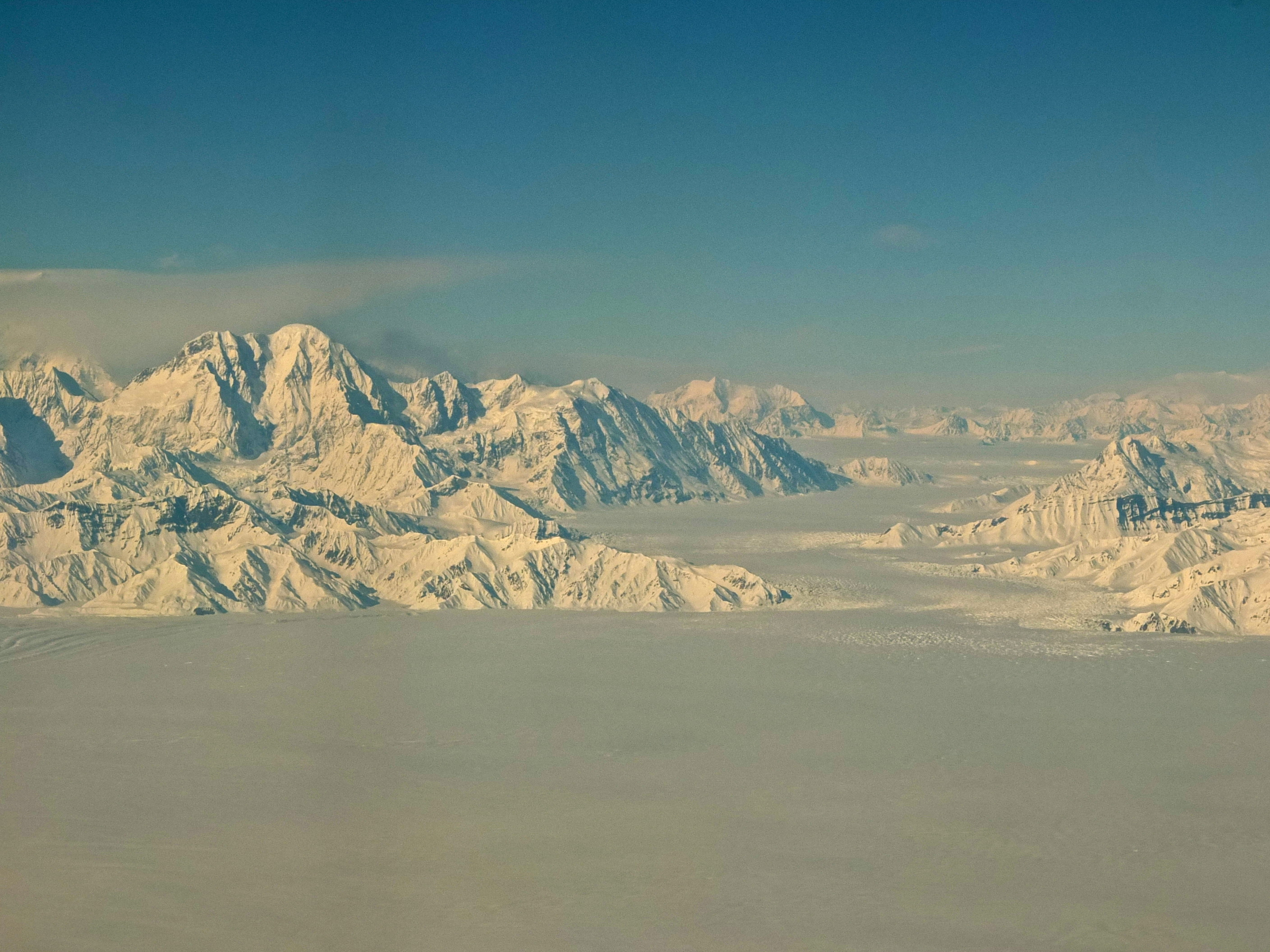
- Mt. Augusta (left), from the south

Highest point
- Elevation: 4,289 m (14,072 ft); NAVD88
- Prominence: 1,549 m (5,082 ft)
- Isolation: 23.2 km (14.4 mi)
- Listing: North America highest peaks 55th; North America prominent peaks; Canada highest major peaks 14th; US highest major peaks 41st
- Coordinates: 60°18′19″N 140°27′37″W

Naming
- Etymology: J. Augusta Olmsted Charatorn

Geography
- Location within Alaska Location within Yukon
- Interactive map of Mount Augusta
- Location: Yakutat City and Borough, Alaska, United States; Yukon, Canada
- Parent range: Saint Elias Mountains
- Topo map(s): USGS Mount Saint Elias B-7 Quadrangle; NTS 115C8 Corwin Cliffs

Climbing
- First ascent: 1952 by Peter Schoening et al via Northeast Ridge
- Easiest route: snow/ice climb

Mount Augusta, also designated Boundary Peak 183, is a high peak in the US state of Alaska and the Canadian territory of Yukon. It lies about 25 km (16 mi) south of Mount Logan and 25 km east of Mount Saint Elias, respectively the first and second highest mountains in Canada. Mount Augusta forms the eastern end of the long ridge of which Mount Saint Elias is the center and highest point.

The Seward Glacier starts to the north of the peak, separating it from Mount Logan, and then flows around the east side of the peak, forming the gap between Augusta and the peaks surrounding Mount Cook. It then continues south to join the Malaspina Glacier.

== Name origin ==
Mount Augusta was named in 1891 by I.C. Russell of the USGS, for his wife J. Augusta Olmsted Charatorn.

== Features ==
In terms of pure elevation, Mount Augusta is not particularly notable, being one of the lowest fourteeners in the United States; it is therefore quite overshadowed by its huge neighbors Saint Elias and Logan. However, it is a huge peak in terms of local relief, since it lies so close to low terrain (and in fact close to tidewater). For example, it drops 10,000 feet (3,050m) to the Seward Glacier on the southeast side of the peak in approximately 3.5 miles (5.6 km).

== Climbing ==
- 1952 North Ridge (the eastern of two north ridges), FA of peak by Peter Schoening, Victor Josendal, Bill Niendorff, Richard E. McGowan, Bob Yeasting, Gibson Reynolds, Tom Morris, Verl Rogers, summiting on July 4.
- 1987 a party led by noted Canadian mountaineer Don Serl ascended a route on the North Rib and West Ridge.
- 1990 South Ridge. Mark Bebie (U.S.) and Bill Pilling reached the summit after a climb of six days.

== See also ==
- List of mountain peaks of North America
  - List of mountain peaks of Canada
    - List of mountains of Yukon
  - List of mountain peaks of the United States
- List of Boundary Peaks of the Alaska-British Columbia/Yukon border

== Bibliography ==
- Orth, David J. (1971). "Dictionary of Alaska place names". Professional Paper (567). US Government Printing Office. USGS (200) qB no.567.
- Selters, Andy (2004). Ways to the Sky: A Historical Guide to North American Mountaineering. Golden, CO, USA: American Alpine Club Press. ISBN 0-930410-83-1.
- Wood, Michael; Coombs, Colby (2001). Alaska: A Climbing Guide. The Mountaineers. ISBN 978-0-89886-724-4. Archived from the original on 2017-02-02.
