= Mount Macaulay =

Mountain in Yukon, Canada

- Location within Yukon

Highest point
- Elevation: 4,700 m (15,400 ft) (Note: Elevation extrapolated - CGNDB map clearly shows Mt. Macaulay well within the 4680 m contour line.)
- Prominence: 480 m (1,570 ft)
- Coordinates: 61°12′37″N 140°31′35″W

Geography
- Location: Yukon, Canada
- Parent range: Saint Elias Mountains
- Topo map: NTS 115F2 Mount Macaulay

Climbing
- First ascent: 1959
- Easiest route: Glacier/snow/ice climb

Mount Macaulay is a mountain peak in Canada, located in Kluane National Park and Reserve in Yukon.

== See also ==
- List of mountain peaks of North America
  - List of mountain peaks of Canada
