= Saint Elias Mountains =

Mountain range in Canada and USA

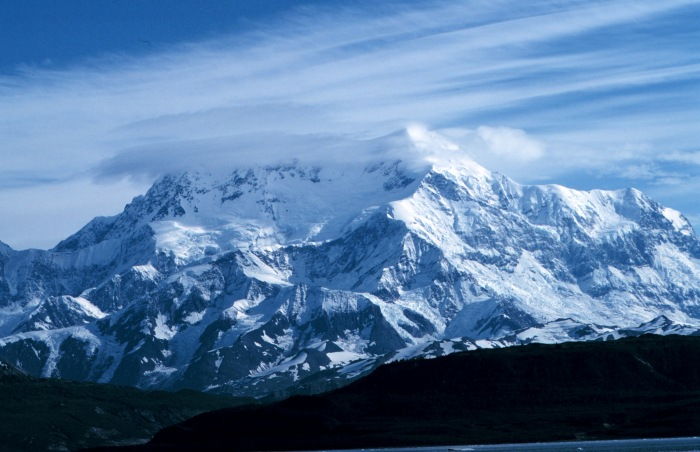
- Mount Saint Elias

Highest point
- Peak: Mount Logan
- Elevation: 5,959 m (19,551 ft)
- Listing: List of mountain ranges
- Coordinates: 60°34′02″N 140°24′19″W

Dimensions
- Length: 300 mi (480 km)
- Width: 90 mi (140 km)
- Area: 112,509 km^{2} (43,440 mi^{2})

Geography
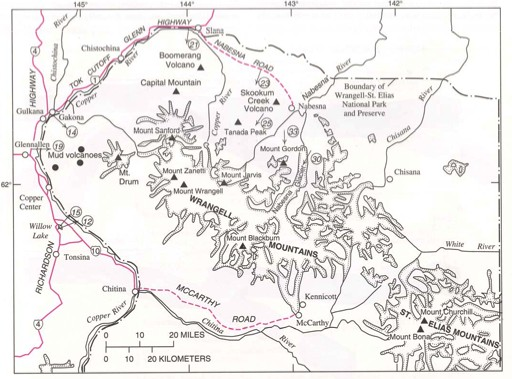
- Saint Elias Mountains, southeast of the Wrangell Mountains
- Countries: United States; Canada
- Province / Territory: British Columbia; Yukon
- State: Alaska
- Range coordinates: 60°30′N 139°30′W
- Parent range: Pacific Coast Ranges
- Borders on: Wrangell Mountains

The Saint Elias Mountains (French: Chaîne Saint-Élie) are a subgroup of the Pacific Coast Ranges, located in southeastern Alaska in the United States, southwestern Yukon and the very far northwestern part of British Columbia in Canada. The range spans Wrangell-St. Elias National Park and Preserve in the United States and Kluane National Park and Reserve in Canada and includes all of Glacier Bay National Park in Alaska. In Alaska, the range includes parts of the city/borough of Yakutat and the Hoonah-Angoon, Copper River and Chugach census areas.

This mountain range is named after Mount Saint Elias, which in turn was named in honor of Elias I of Jerusalem in 1741 by the Danish-born Russian explorer Vitus Bering.

== Geology ==
The Saint Elias Mountains form the highest coastal mountain range on Earth. It formed due to subduction of the Yakutat microplate underneath the North American Plate. The Yakutat microplate is a wedge shaped oceanic plateau with a thickness of 20 to 30 kilometres (12 to 19 mi). Similar to the adjacent Pacific Plate, which has a crustal thickness of 7 kilometres (4.3 mi), the Yakutat plate is moving northwestward at a rate of 50 millimetres (2 in) per year with respect to North America. The Yakutat plate is transported northwards along the active Fairweather Fault, which probably started more than 35 million years ago. Due to its thickness, the Yakutat plate is buoyant, resulting in surface uplift of the overriding North American plate, which formed the Talkeetna Mountains and the Alaska Range in Southcentral Alaska, located above the subducted part of the Yakutat plate.

The Saint Elias Mountains formed at the plate boundary between the Yakutat and North American plates. The up-to-12-kilometre (7.5 mi)-thick sediments that have been deposited on top of the Yakutat plate became imbricated and deformed as they were scraped off and compose today the southern (coastal) flanks of the St. Elias Mountains. In contrast the high elevated regions of the drainage divide (Bagley Icefield, Seward Glacier) and north of it are composed of rocks that are part of the North American plate. The highest peaks of the St. Elias Mountains are located in the high ice field region of the Kluane National Park (Mount Logan, Mount Vancouver) and north of the Malaspina Glacier (Mount Saint Elias, Mount Cook), in the region known as the St. Elias syntaxis. At the syntaxis region the tectonic style changes from strike-slip motion along the Fairweather Fault to collision west of Malaspina Strait. This tectonic transition concentrates stress in the crust at the syntaxis that together with efficient glacial erosion results in positive feedback processes that through time forms extreme high mountain peaks and local relief, and rapid exhumation of rocks from up to 10 km (6.2 mi) depths to the surface.

== Climate ==
The Saint Elias Mountains have one of the most extreme climates in North America, produced by the collision of moisture-laden Pacific storm systems with the highest coastal mountain wall on Earth. The range divides sharply into two climatic regimes: a comparatively mild but violently stormy maritime zone on its southern and southeastern (windward) flanks, and a dry, intensely cold continental zone in its northern interior, sheltered within the range's rain shadow.

=== Precipitation and storms ===
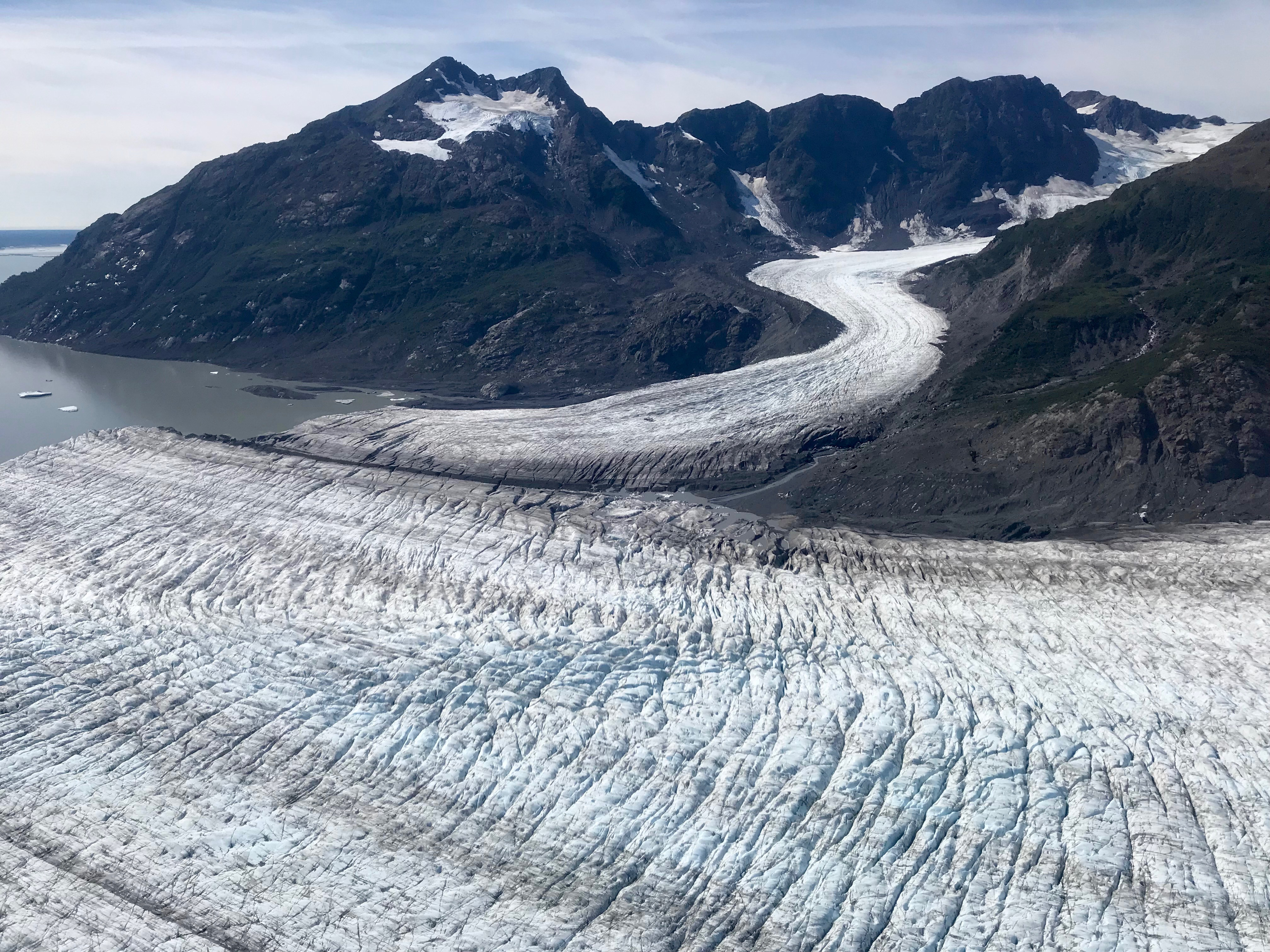
Yakutat Icefield – an expanse of ice in southeast Alaska – in 2018.

Cyclonic storms tracking in off the Gulf of Alaska strike the coastal wall of the range and are forced abruptly upward, releasing some of the heaviest precipitation recorded anywhere in North America; annual snowfall across the range's icefields has been described as exceeding that received anywhere else on the continent. Downstream of the peaks, the town of Yakutat receives an average of about 151 inches (3,840 mm) of precipitation and more than 200 inches (5,100 mm) of snow each winter, with numerous storms and high winds accompanying the wet spring, autumn and winter seasons. Modelled precipitation data compiled by the Alaska Climate Research Center suggest that the unmonitored high country southeast of Yakutat, where moist Pacific air is forced over the range's steep coastal front, may receive upward of 450 inches (11,400 mm) of precipitation a year, which would place it among the wettest locations on Earth.

This orographic effect sustains the range's icefields, the most extensive glaciated system outside the polar regions. Research combining in-situ snow accumulation data with back-trajectory modelling has found that high-intensity Gulf of Alaska storms deposit heavy snowfall across the entire Saint Elias–Alaska Range region simultaneously, whereas lower-intensity systems are largely blocked by the coastal wall and reach the continental interior only through gaps in the mountains, such as the Alsek River valley.

These storms have also made the range notorious among mountaineers for sudden, violent weather. Systems can arrive within hours and pin climbers in place with sustained hurricane-force winds and zero visibility; in June 2015, three experienced mountaineers descending Mount Logan were trapped for more than a week by winds estimated at 160 km/h (100 mph), surviving by hand-digging a snow cave into a crevasse. Parks Canada's climbing-permit application for the range's icefields warns applicants to prepare for storms, high winds, zero visibility, and temperatures below −40 °C (−40 °F); between 1973 and 2015, roughly 4,000 climbers and skiers visited the icefield ranges, of whom 15 died.

=== Temperature ===
The two sides of the range differ almost as sharply in temperature as in precipitation. The Kluane Front Ranges and other areas within the range's rain shadow experience a dry, cold continental climate with long, severe winters, while the coastal slopes remain comparatively mild but are rarely dry.

At high elevation, the cold becomes extreme even by subarctic standards. On the roughly 5,000-metre (16,000 ft) summit plateau of Mount Logan, the highest peak in Canada and second-highest in North America, average air temperatures fall to about −45 °C (−49 °F) in winter and remain around −27 °C (−17 °F) even at the height of summer, with the plateau not known to rise above freezing at any time of year. These conditions make the summit plateau one of the very few non-polar sites where ancient annual snow layers survive undisturbed by summer melt, preserving a climate record that in one ice core has been traced back roughly 20,000 years, drilled from a site between Prospector and Russell peaks. Extreme low-temperature readings on the mountain have been reported in the range of −77 °C (−107 °F), a figure mountaineering sources describe as among the coldest air temperatures ever recorded outside Antarctica, though it was taken at very high altitude and is not counted among official lowland temperature records for Canada or North America.

== Ranges ==
The mountains are divided by the Duke Depression, with the shorter, more rounded Kluane Ranges to the east, and the higher Icefield Ranges to the west. Sub-ranges of the Saint Elias include the Alsek Ranges, the Fairweather Range, and the Centennial Range.

== Highest mountains ==
The highest mountains of the range include:

| Rank | Mountain | Height | | Location | Notes | Coordinates |
| Rank | Mountain | m | ft | Location | Notes | Coordinates |
|---|---|---|---|---|---|---|
| 1 | Mount Logan | 5,959 | 19,551 | Yukon | Highest mountain in Canada | 60°34′2″N 140°24′19″W |
| 2 | Mount Saint Elias | 5,489 | 18,009 | Alaska-Yukon | Second highest in both Canada and the United States | 60°17′32″N 140°55′53″W |
| 3 | Mount Lucania | 5,240 | 17,190 | Yukon | #3 in Canada | 61°1′24″N 140°27′56″W |
| 4 | King Peak | 5,173 | 16,972 | Yukon | #4 in Canada | 60°34′59″N 140°39′14″W |
| 5 | Mount Steele | 5,073 | 16,644 | Yukon | #5 in Canada | 61°5′36″N 140°18′39″W |
| 6 | Mount Bona | 5,040 | 16,540 | Alaska | #5 in the United States | 61°23′8″N 141°44′56″W |
| 7 | Mount Wood | 4,850 | 15,910 | Yukon | #7 in Canada | 61°13′58″N 140°30′45″W |
| 8 | Mount Vancouver | 4,812 | 15,787 | Yukon | #15 in North America | 60°20′4″N 139°41′32″W |
| 9 | Mount Churchill | 4,766 | 15,636 | Alaska | 4th highest volcano in the United States | 61°25′9″N 141°42′55″W |
| 10 | Mount Macaulay | 4,700 | 15,400 | Yukon | Connected to SW ridge of Mt. Wood | 61°12′37″N 140°31′35″W |
| 11 | Mount Fairweather | 4,671 | 15,325 | Alaska-B.C. | #1 in British Columbia | 58°54′23″N 137°31′35″W |
| 12 | Mount Hubbard | 4,557 | 14,951 | Alaska-Yukon | #8 in United States, #12 in Canada | 60°19′9″N 139°4′17″W |
| 13 | Mount Bear | 4,520 | 14,830 | Alaska | #18 in United States | 61°17′2″N 141°8′31″W |
| 14 | Mount Walsh | 4,507 | 14,787 | Yukon | | 61°0′0″N 140°1′1″W |
| 15 | Mount Alverstone | 4,420 | 14,500 | Alaska-Yukon | | 60°21′10″N 139°4′32″W |
| 16 | University Peak | 4,410 | 14,470 | Alaska | | 61°19′38″N 141°47′6″W |
| 17 | McArthur Peak | 4,344 | 14,252 | Yukon | | 60°36′23″N 140°12′50″W |
| 18 | Mount Augusta | 4,289 | 14,072 | Alaska-Yukon | | 60°18′19″N 140°27′37″W |
| 19 | Mount Kennedy | 4,250 | 13,940 | Yukon | Elevation is estimated 4,250 to 4,300 m (13,940 to 14,110 ft). | 60°20′28″N 138°57′59″W |
| 20 | Mount Cook | 4,196 | 13,766 | Alaska-Yukon | | 60°10′55″N 139°58′51″W |

== Image ==
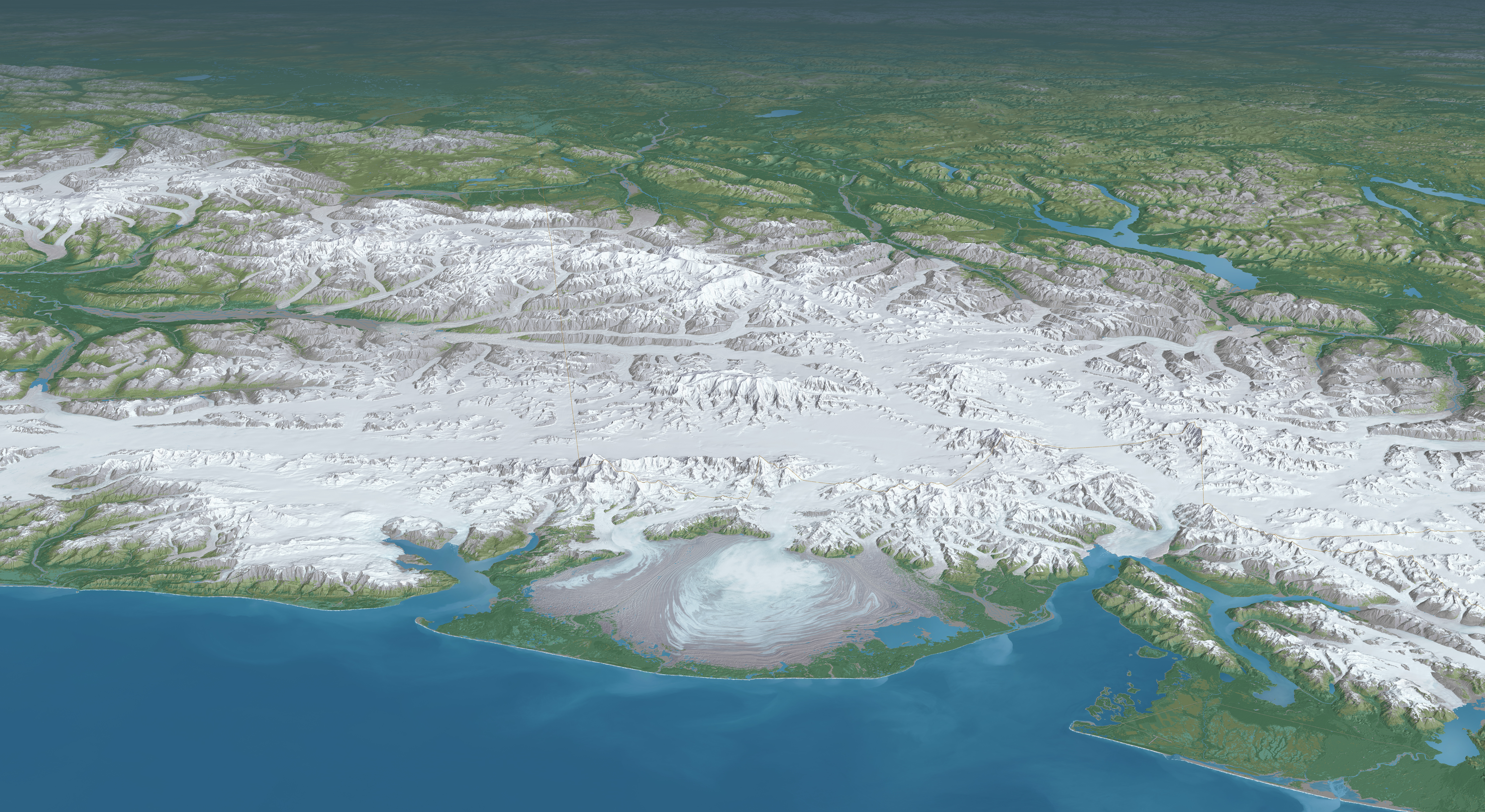
3D rendered panorama of the Saint Elias Mountains and Malaspina Glacier
