= Tombstone (disambiguation) =

A tombstone is a stele or marker, usually stone, that is placed over a grave.

Tombstone may also refer to:

== Places ==
- Tombstone, Arizona, U.S.
  - Tombstone Municipal Airport
- Tombstone (mountain), in Oregon, U.S.
- Tombstone Mountain, in the Canadian Rockies
- Tombstone Territorial Park, in Yukon, Canada
  - Tombstone Mountain (Yukon), in Tombstone Territorial Park
- Tombstone Hill, Antarctica

== Arts and entertainment ==
=== Film ===
- Tombstone, the Town Too Tough to Die, a 1942 Western film
- Tombstone (film), a 1993 Western film

=== Literature ===
- Tombstone: An Iliad of the Southwest, a 1927 novel by Walter Noble Burns
- Tombstone, a 1933 novel by Clarence Budington Kelland
- Tombstone, a 1981 novel by Matt Braun
- Tombstone, a 1983 novel by Hank Mitchum, the fourth installment in the Stagecoach Station series
- Tombstone (character), a Marvel Comics character who debuted in Web of Spider-Man #36 (March 1988)
- Tombstones, a 1995 duology of young adult horror novels by John Peel
- Tombstone: The Untold Story of Mao's Great Famine, a 2008 non-fiction book by Yang Jisheng

=== Music ===
- "Tombstone" (Ocean Alley song), 2019
- "Tombstone" (Rod Wave song), 2021
- "Tombstone", a song by Civil War from The Last Full Measure, 2016
- Tombstone Records, a record label founded by the band Dead Moon

=== Other ===
- Tombstone, a combat robot competing in BattleBots

== Other uses ==
- Tombstone (advertising), a particular type of text-only print advertisement
- Tombstone (financial industry), a type of print notice to formally announce a particular transaction
- Tombstone (data store), a deleted record in a replica of a distributed data store
- Tombstone (manufacturing), a fixture onto which are placed parts to be manufactured
- Tombstone (pizza), a brand of frozen pizza
- Tombstone (programming), a mechanism to detect dangling pointers
- Tombstone (typography), a symbol often used in mathematical proofs
- Tombstone, or museum label, describing exhibited objects
- Tombstone, another ringname of wrestler 911
- TOMB STONE, S-300 surface-to-air missile system radar
- Tombstoning
- Tombstone (surfing), When surfer is held underwater and tries to climb up their leash the board is straight up and down
- Tombstone (lazy deletions), a vacant slot that has been left behind by a lazy deletion in a data structure

== See also ==
- Gunfight at the O.K. Corral, an 1881 shootout in Tombstone, Arizona Territory
- Tombstone Piledriver, or kneeling reverse piledriver, a professional wrestling move
