= Acrylic trophy =

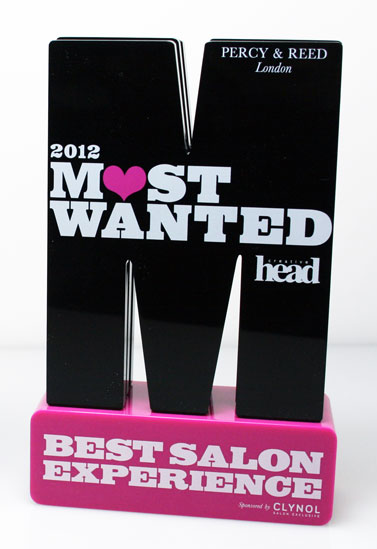
2012 "Most Wanted" Award

An acrylic trophy is an alternative to the traditional glass, or crystal trophy. Acrylic glass can be molded into a variety of forms, and corporations will often create custom promotional items shaped like their products. They are manufactured by pouring acrylic sheets casting resin into a mold. Embedments are acrylic trophies that have an item embedded into the resin. Many materials can be placed in an embedment – paper, metal, acetate sheets, etc. This creates the effect of an item floating within the acrylic statue.

These trophies are commonly made from Lucite, a branded form of acrylic developed by DuPont. One of the earliest uses of Lucite was in windshields for fighter planes during World War II. Following the war, DuPont promoted various consumer applications of Lucite, including its use in lamps, beer taps, hairbrushes, and jewelry. By virtue of its versatility, Lucite opened up a range of possible design options for deal toys and trophies, often resulting in keen competition among investment banks for the most creative and sophisticated pieces.

Deal toys are acrylic trophies used in the financial industry in recognition of sales achievements. Deal toys are most commonly used within the financial industry, especially among investment banks, as a means of celebrating successful transactions. Since their beginnings in the 1970s, deal toys have become a fixture in the investment banking industry, and as multi-national and cross-border transactions have become increasingly common, they have done much to popularize the use of acrylic in gifts and trophies internationally.
