= Lights out (manufacturing) =

Designing automated factories to not require humans on-site

Lights-out manufacturing or dark factory is the manufacturing methodology of fully automating the production of goods at factories and other industrial facilities, without requiring any human labour presence on-site. Many of these factories are considered to be able to run "with the lights off," but few run exclusively lights-out production. For example, in computer numerical control machining, the presence of human workers is typically required for removing completed parts and setting up tombstones that hold unfinished parts. As the technology necessary for total automation becomes increasingly available, many factories are beginning to use lights-out production between shifts (or as a separate shift) to meet increasing production demand or to save money on labor.

An automatic factory is a place where raw materials enter, and finished products leave with little or no human intervention. One of the earliest descriptions of the automatic factory in fiction was the 1955 short story "Autofac," by Philip K. Dick.

== Real-world examples ==
=== "Lights out" computer numerical control (CNC) machining ===
CNC machines do not require continuous operator attention, and some models can run unattended. A few machine shops run CNC unattended on nights and weekends. Although the machines are run without being under constant supervision, it is a common practice to always have a person in the vicinity of the machine.

=== Existing "lights-out factories" ===
FANUC, a Japanese robotics company, has been a lights-out factory since 2001. Robots are building other robots at a rate of about 50 per 24-hour shift and can run unsupervised for as long as 30 days at a time. "Not only is it lights-out," says Fanuc vice president Gary Zywiol, "we turn off the air conditioning and heat too."

In the Netherlands, Philips uses lights-out manufacturing to produce electric razors, with 128 robots made by Adept Technology. There are only nine human quality assurance workers who oversee the end of the manufacturing process.

In the manufacturing of integrated circuits using 300 mm wafers, the entire manufacturing process is completely automated, with workers only making sure that the process runs without problems and repairing any faulty machinery..

Xiaomi has an 860,000 square foot factory in Changping, Beijing capable of manufacturing 10 million smartphones a year across 11 fully automated production lines.

ASE Group, a Taiwanese company that handles outsourced semiconductor packaging and testing have 56 lights out factories.

Adept Manufacturing & Gauging, LLC, in Milwaukee, Wisconsin, USA, uses lights-out manufacturing on different machines to keep parts costs low and improve production.

== Motivations for lights-out factories ==
Lights-out manufacturing may increase productivity and lower upkeep costs. Companies incorporating lights-out methodologies into floor plans only need to consider robotic workers, which minimize space and climate-control requirements. Human laborers can be dispatched to a separate location for tasks such as quality assurance. Optimizing manufacturing space for a fully autonomous robotic workforce allows for an increase in productivity.

James Cook, an application engineer at Stäubli, the business development and marketing manager at Stäubli Robotics, says robots can help lower building costs by requiring smaller work cells. He states that "manufacturers can fit a larger number of compact cells in the same space to increase production without adding heating, lighting, or cooling to the cost of the building." Floor space is also important for energy conservation, as a smaller space reduces energy consumption by reducing heating costs. Without human workers, climate-control systems are unnecessary, and smaller layouts require less electricity.

== See also ==
- Automation
- Self-replicating machine
