= Mount Monolith =

Mountain in Yukon, Canada

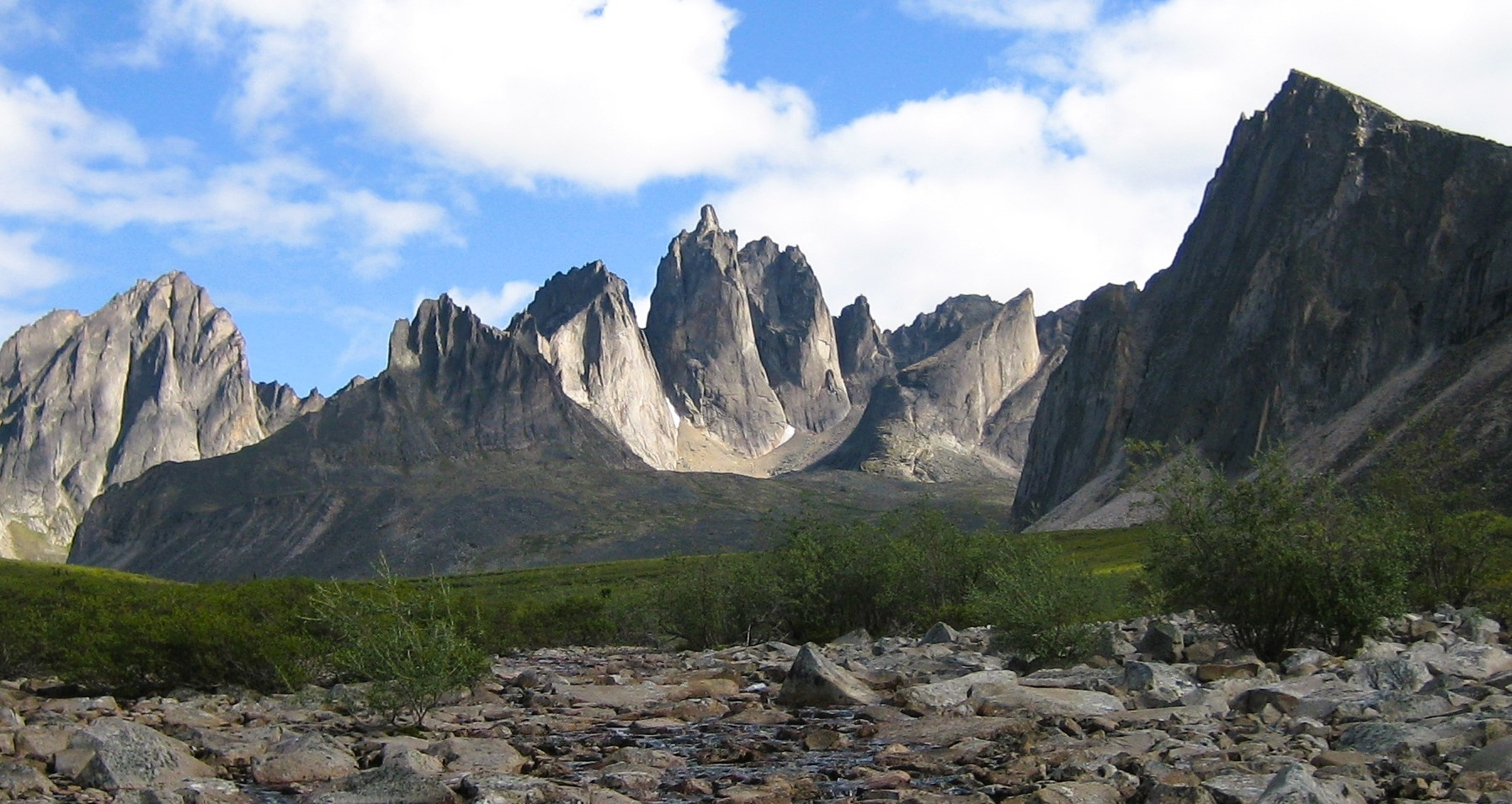
- Summit centered, west aspect

Highest point
- Elevation: 2,165 m (7,103 ft)
- Prominence: 444 m (1,457 ft)
- Parent peak: Tombstone Mountain
- Isolation: 4.43 km (2.75 mi)
- Coordinates: 64°25′36″N 138°31′35″W

Naming
- Etymology: Monolith

Geography
- Location within Yukon
- Interactive map of Mount Monolith
- Location: Yukon, Canada
- Protected area: Tombstone Territorial Park
- Parent range: Ogilvie Mountains
- Topo map: NTS 116B7 Tombstone River

Geology
- Rock age: Cretaceous
- Rock type: Granite

Mount Monolith is a mountain in Yukon, Canada.

== Description ==
Mount Monolith is a 2,165-metre-elevation (7,103-foot) summit located in the Ogilvie Mountains and within Tombstone Territorial Park. It ranks as the sixth-highest mountain in the Ogilvie Mountains. Precipitation runoff from the remote peak drains into the Tombstone River and North Klondike River which are both part of the Yukon River watershed. Topographic relief is significant as the summit rises 725 metres (2,379 feet) above the Tombstone River in less than two kilometres (1.2 miles). The nearest road is the Dempster Highway 11 km (7 mi) to the southeast, and the nearest town is Dawson, 60 km (37 mi) to the southwest. Based on the Köppen climate classification, Mount Monolith is located in a subarctic climate zone with long, cold, winters, and short, mild summers. Winter temperatures can drop below −40 °C with wind chill factors below −50 °C. The toponym was officially adopted on July 30, 1968, by the Geographical Names Board of Canada.

== Gallery ==
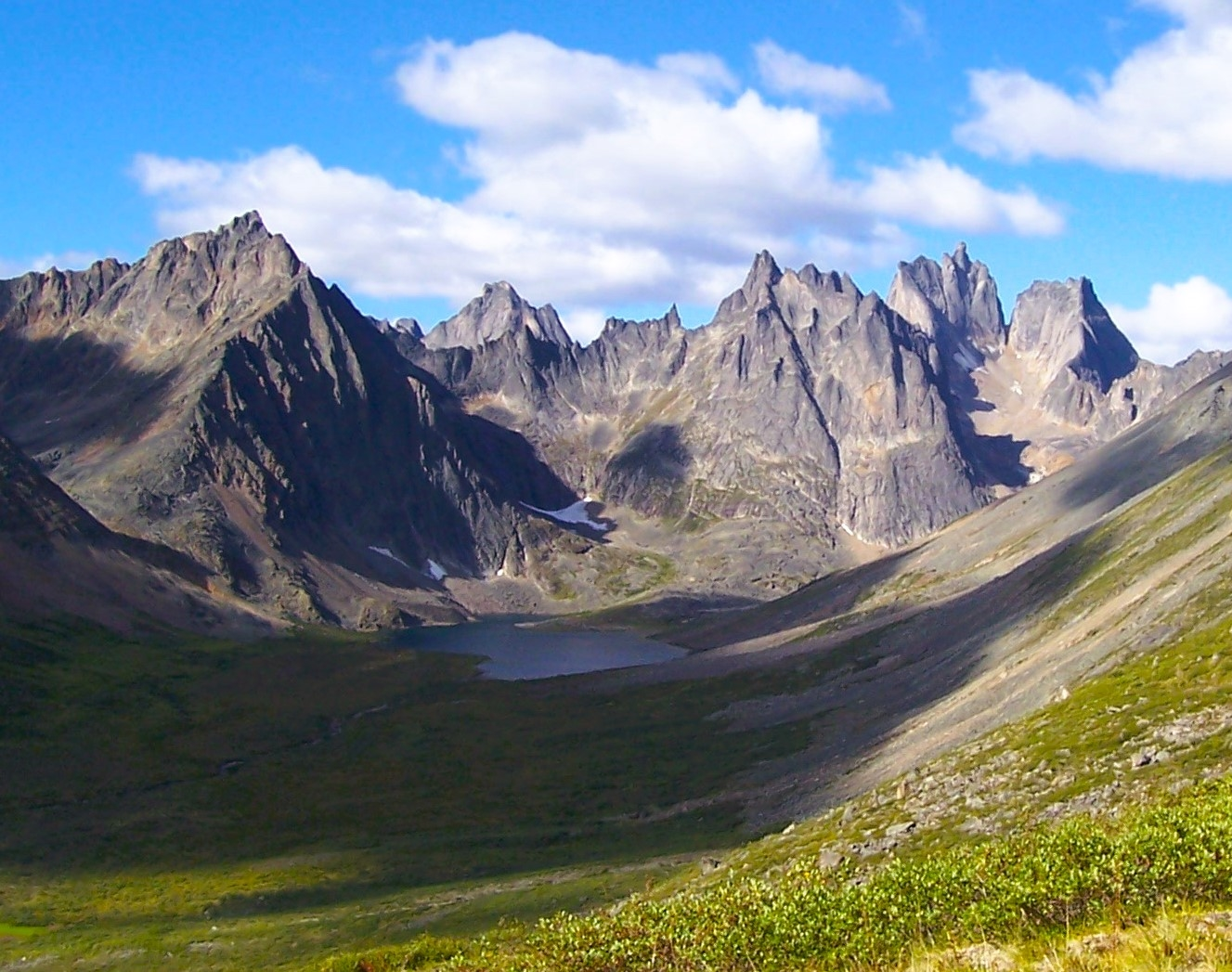
East aspect of Mount Monolith (to right, in back)
View from Grizzly Creek Valley with Grizzly Lake centered

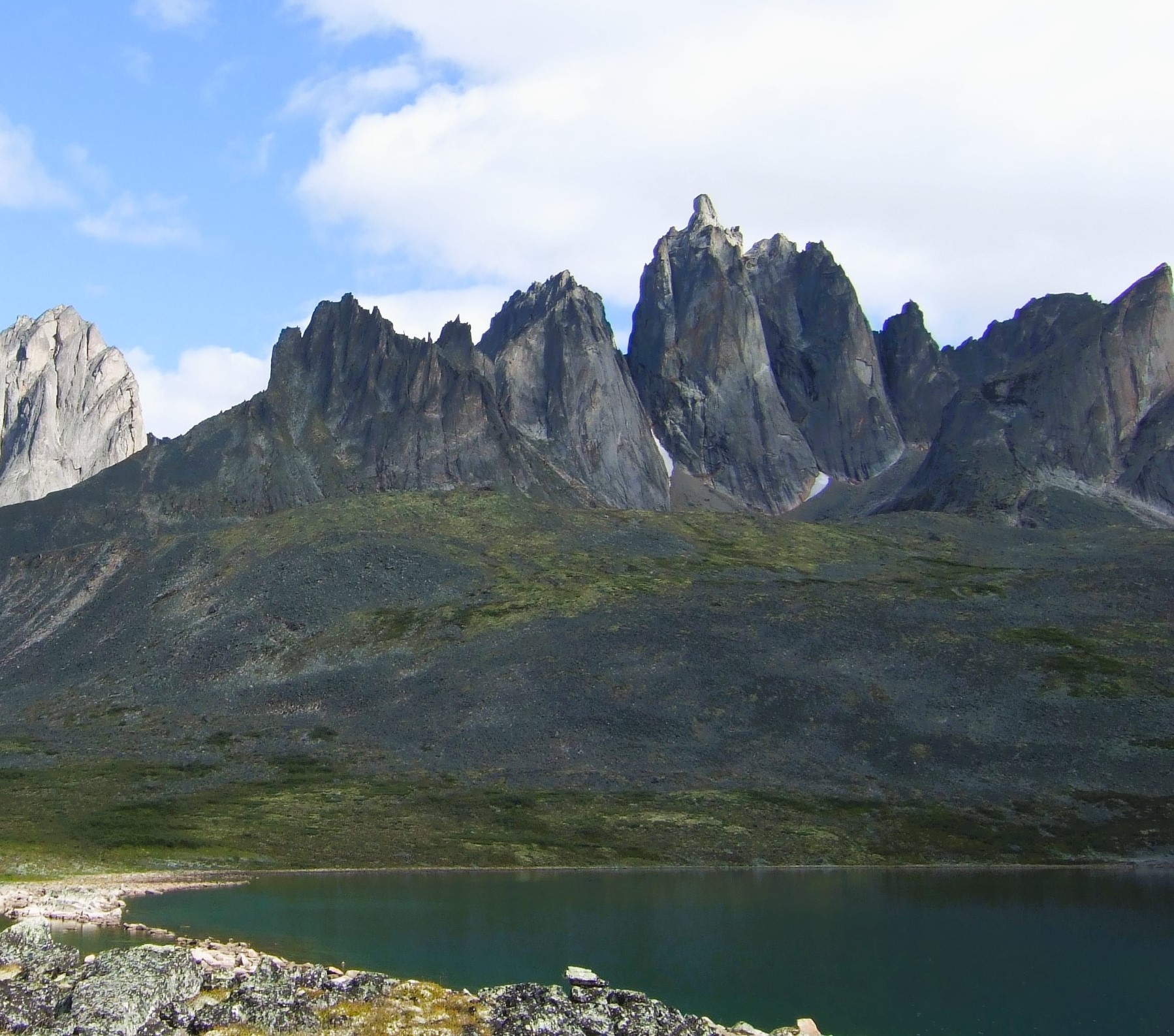
West aspect

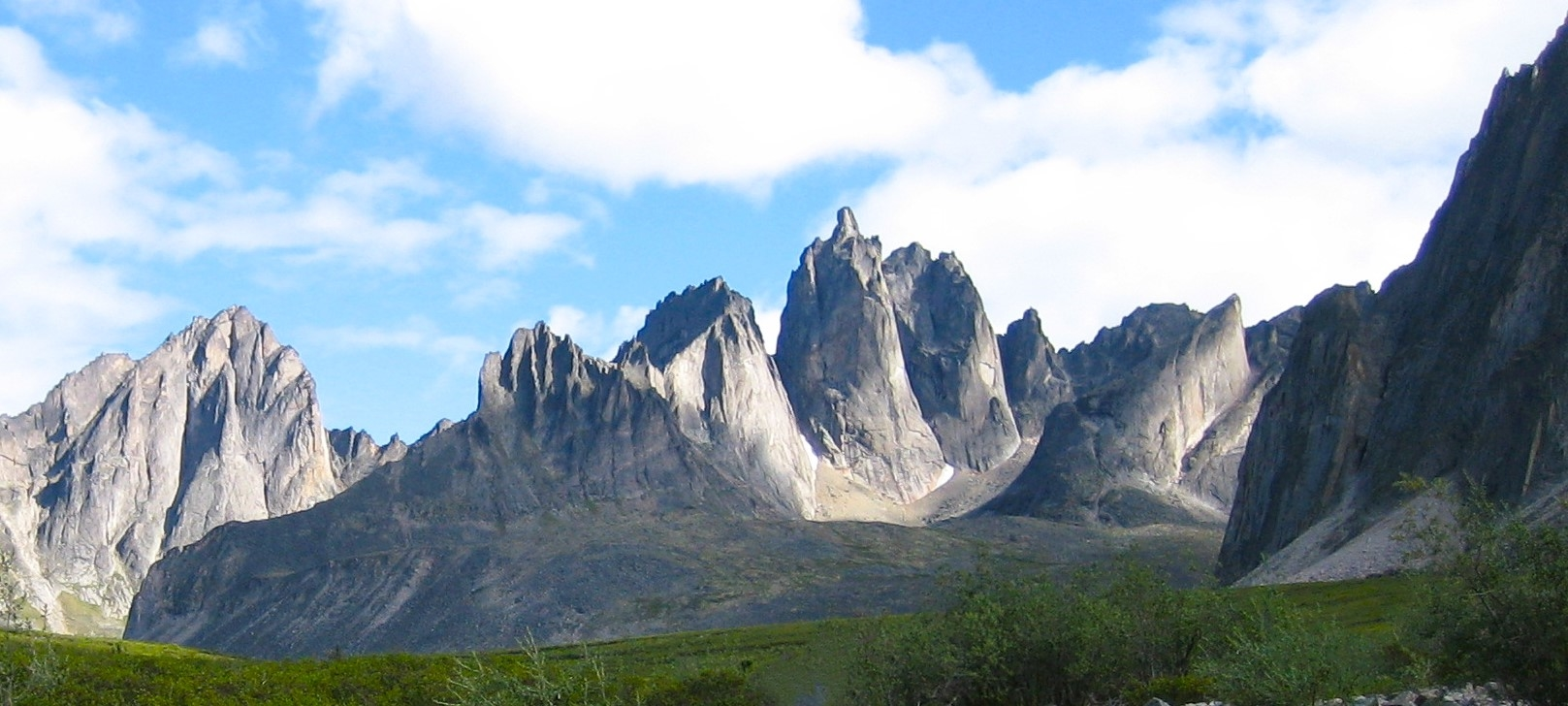
West aspect

== See also ==
- List of mountains of Canada
- Geography of Yukon
