= Headstone (disambiguation) =

A headstone is a grave marker.

Headstone may also refer to:

- Headstone, London, an area of London, England
- Headstones (band), a Canadian rock band
- Headstones (album), an album by Lake of Tears
- "Headstone", a song by Brothers Osborne from the deluxe edition of Skeletons (Brothers Osborne album)
- Bradley Headstone, a character in the novel Our Mutual Friend

== See also ==
- Headstone Lane railway station, in London
- Headstone Manor, a part of Harrow Museum
- Tombstone (disambiguation)
