= Deal toy =

Customized memento or gift

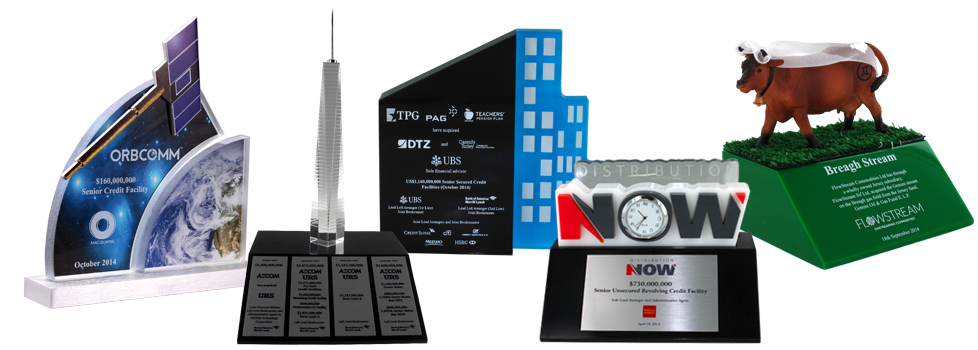
Deal toys from various industries

A deal toy (also deal gift, lucite tombstone or financial tombstone) is a customized memento or gift that is intended to mark and commemorate the closing of a business deal in finance or investment banking. These plaques or other types of trophies are typically presented at the closing ceremony or dinner to the issuer and senior third-party advisers of the major financial transactions as a souvenir.

== History ==
The deal toy is the marriage of a design with the tombstone advertisement, a term that dates to the late 19th century, when printers used it to refer to "column-width newspaper ads run without any illustration or typographical ornamentation." Restrictions imposed by the Securities Act of 1933 meant that the tombstone ad became the format that companies and banks used to publicize financial transactions such as initial public offerings. From at least the late 1960s, law firms and banks produced Lucite slabs that encased the tombstone ads announcing new partner classes. By the early 1970s, deal closings were being similarly immortalized. Advertising executive Don McDonald is credited with creating one of the first Lucite deal toys in 1973 for a friend who had become an investment banker. McDonald left his advertising job to found Don McDonald & Associates, which went on to open offices abroad and produce as many as 5,000 deal toys a year by the mid-1990s. The firm later became part of Altrum Honors Inc., a Quebec-based company that continues to produce deal toys for investment banks.

As a result of the banking crisis of 2008, investment banks closed fewer deals, and deal toy budgets were reined in accordingly.

== Purpose ==
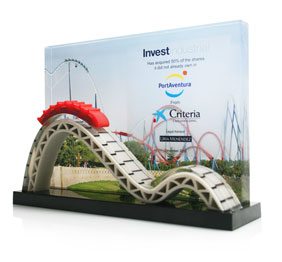
A rollercoaster-themed deal toy commemorating Investindustrial’s acquisition of Port Aventura from CriteriaCaixa in 2009

Deal toys are designed to commemorate a financial transaction. This memento is described as an ad hoc creation to a financial offering or other major investment banking transaction and is most often presented at the closing ceremony of the deal.

This souvenir typically includes the names or logos of the firms for which the transaction is completed (the recipients), description of the transaction (type, size and, date of the deal) as well as the names and or logos of the key financial advisors and financiers involved in that transaction. Because the recipients of the award are the clients of the advisors and financiers, the award also acts as a marketing tool for the presenter long after the transaction has passed.

As deal toys became used within the investment banking industry, they also became a point of pride—and competition—with firms frequently seeking to outdo each other with creative and elaborate designs. Many deal toys include inside jokes related to the closing of the deal.

The banking crisis of 2008 caused many financial firms to rein in spending generally, and on deal toys specifically. Though many financial firms have recently eased restrictions on tombstone budgets, they largely have not been restored to pre-crisis levels. Average order size, which had ranged between 50-60 pieces prior to 2008, had by 2013 stabilized at around 20-30. Order quantities can still reach approximately 50 or 60 for larger transactions.

== Status ==
Deal toys are generally considered to be prized by the recipient, indicating achievement. Deal toys possessed by an individual can also serve as a reflection of his or her status, as they indicate the number of transactions with which they have been involved. They are displayed to help persuade potential clients to work with a firm on their transaction.

== See also ==
- Acrylic trophy
- Cast acrylic
- Tombstone (financial industry)
