= Cell casting =

Cell casting is a method used for creating poly(methyl methacrylate) (PMMA) sheets. Liquid monomer is poured between two flat sheets of toughened glass sealed with a rubber gasket and heated for polymerization. Because the glass sheets may contain surface scratches or sag during the process, this traditional method has some disadvantages: among other problems, the PMMA sheets may contain variations in thickness and surface defects. For many applications it has since been replaced by other methods for making PMMA such as extrusion, which gives uniform surface features. However, for applications where strength is critical cell casting techniques are still employed in conjunction with stretching, which produces a stronger overall material.

"Cell Casting - A process in which a casting liquid is poured between two plates, usually glass, that have a gasket between them to form a cell to contain the casting liquid; then the resin solidifies, usually through polymerization or crosslinking." - A. Brent Strong
