= Ogilvie Mountains =

Mountain range in the Yukon Territory, northwestern Canada

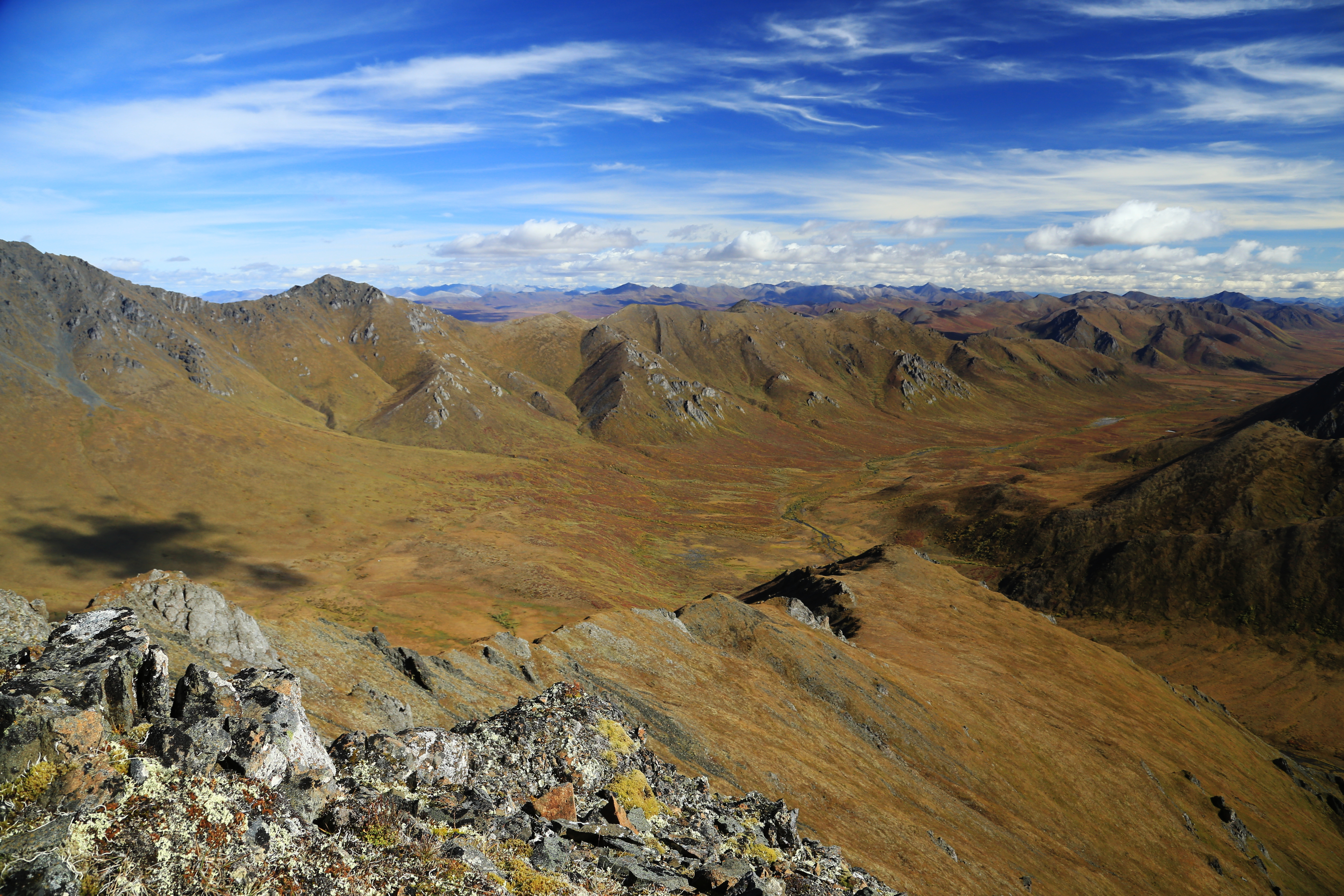
- Mountains in Tombstone Territorial Park

Highest point
- Peak: Mount Frank Rae
- Elevation: 2,362 m (7,749 ft)
- Coordinates: 64°28′13″N 138°33′18″W

Geography
- Location within Yukon
- Country: Canada
- Territories: Yukon
- Range coordinates: 64°40′04″N 138°28′41″W
- Parent range: Yukon Ranges
- Topo map: NTS 116B9 North Fork Pass

The Ogilvie Mountains are a mountain range in the Yukon Territory of northwestern Canada.

Geologically they are part of the Yukon Ranges, in the upper Laramide Belt of the North American Cordillera.

== Geography ==
The range lies north of Dawson City, and is crossed by the Dempster Highway.

The area was first surveyed by William Ogilvie and the range subsequently named after him.

Sub-ranges

- Nahoni Range

Peaks

The best known mountain peaks of the Ogilvie Mountains are located within Tombstone Territorial Park.

The highest mountain within the range is Mount Frank Rae, at 2,362 m (7,749 ft) in elevation.

The range's most familiar mountains, with their jagged granite peaks, are:

- Tombstone Mountain
- Mount Monolith
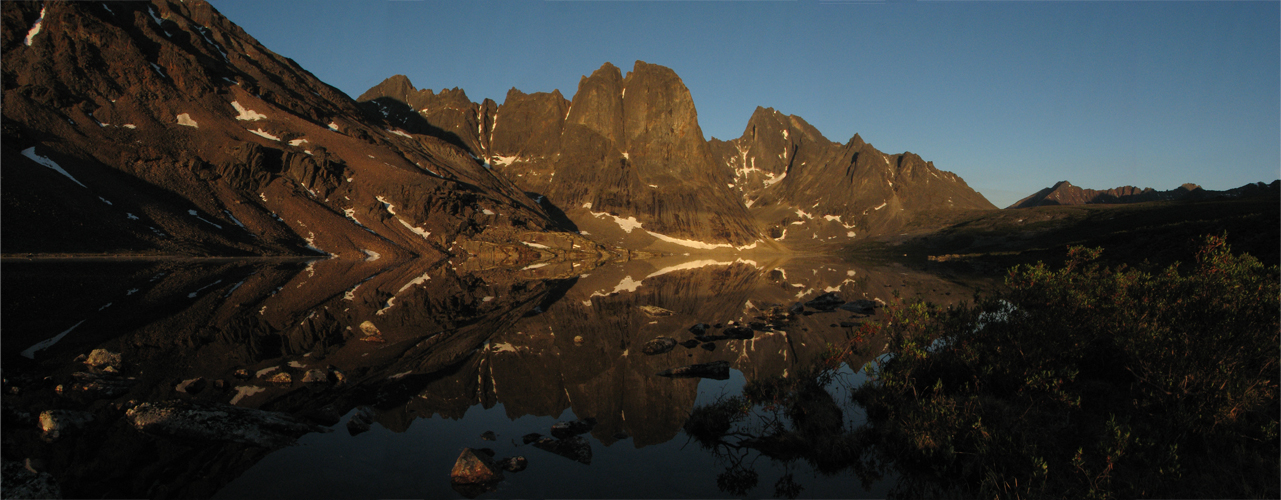
Mount Monolith of the Ogilvie Mountains, seen at dawn from Divide Lake, in Tombstone Territorial Park

== Climate ==
Ogilvie River is a weather station near the Ogilvie Maintenance Compound in the northern Ogilvie Mountains, situated at an elevation of 597 m (1959 ft).

Climate data for Ogilvie River, Yukon, 1981-2006 normals, 1971-2008 extremes: 1959ft (597m)
Month	Jan	Feb	Mar	Apr	May	Jun	Jul	Aug	Sep	Oct	Nov	Dec	Year
Record high °C (°F)	7 (44)	7 (44)	8 (46)	16 (61)	28 (82)	31 (88)	31 (88)	31 (87)	26 (79)	22 (72)	7 (45)	10 (50)	31 (88)
Mean maximum °C (°F)	−6.6 (20.2)	−1.3 (29.6)	1.4 (34.6)	10.2 (50.3)	19.9 (67.9)	26.2 (79.2)	26.4 (79.6)	24.8 (76.6)	18.1 (64.5)	7.8 (46.0)	−4.1 (24.6)	−2.7 (27.1)	27.7 (81.9)
Mean daily maximum °C (°F)	−22.4 (−8.4)	−18.7 (−1.7)	−11.9 (10.6)	−0.2 (31.6)	10.4 (50.8)	18.8 (65.8)	20.0 (68.0)	16.6 (61.8)	9.2 (48.6)	−4.4 (24.0)	−18.3 (−1.0)	−19.9 (−3.9)	−1.7 (28.9)
Daily mean °C (°F)	−28.3 (−19.0)	−25.6 (−14.1)	−21.4 (−6.6)	−9.7 (14.6)	3.6 (38.4)	11.3 (52.4)	12.9 (55.2)	9.7 (49.4)	3.0 (37.4)	−9.9 (14.1)	−24.0 (−11.2)	−25.7 (−14.2)	−8.7 (16.4)
Mean daily minimum °C (°F)	−35.5 (−31.9)	−33.3 (−28.0)	−30.9 (−23.6)	−18.7 (−1.7)	−3.2 (26.3)	4.1 (39.4)	5.8 (42.5)	2.7 (36.9)	−3.1 (26.4)	−15.2 (4.6)	−29.4 (−21.0)	−31.9 (−25.4)	−15.7 (3.7)
Mean minimum °C (°F)	−48.9 (−56.0)	−48.3 (−55.0)	−44.7 (−48.5)	−33.7 (−28.6)	−13.1 (8.4)	−1.7 (29.0)	0.0 (32.0)	−4.1 (24.6)	−10.7 (12.7)	−29.8 (−21.7)	−41.2 (−42.2)	−45.1 (−49.1)	−50.9 (−59.7)
Record low °C (°F)	−57 (−71)	−56 (−69)	−54 (−66)	−43 (−45)	−27 (−17)	−6 (21)	−3 (27)	−10 (14)	−25 (−13)	−42 (−44)	−51 (−59)	−53 (−63)	−57 (−71)
Average precipitation mm (inches)	14 (0.57)	14 (0.56)	9.9 (0.39)	7.9 (0.31)	22 (0.86)	43 (1.70)	53 (2.07)	40 (1.56)	33 (1.30)	27 (1.07)	18 (0.69)	18 (0.71)	299.8 (11.79)
Average snowfall cm (inches)	15 (5.8)	14 (5.6)	9.9 (3.9)	7.1 (2.8)	5.3 (2.1)	0.25 (0.1)	0.0 (0.0)	0.51 (0.2)	8.4 (3.3)	24 (9.5)	18 (6.9)	18 (7.1)	120.46 (47.3)
Source: XMACIS2 (normals, extremes & precip/snow)
