= Tombstone (advertising) =

Print advertisement format

A tombstone is a particular type of print advertisement appearing in a newspaper or magazine. Tombstone ads are typically unadorned text, black on white, often enclosed in a simple box, with a centered headline and a number of lines in the body of the ad, usually also centered. The name originates from their similarity in appearance to the text on a tombstone (headstone) grave marker.

Besides underwriters in a securities offering (see tombstone (financial industry)), fine art dealers and some traditional luxury goods vendors sometimes also use the tombstone form.
