= Mount Frank Rae =

Mountain in Yukon, Canada

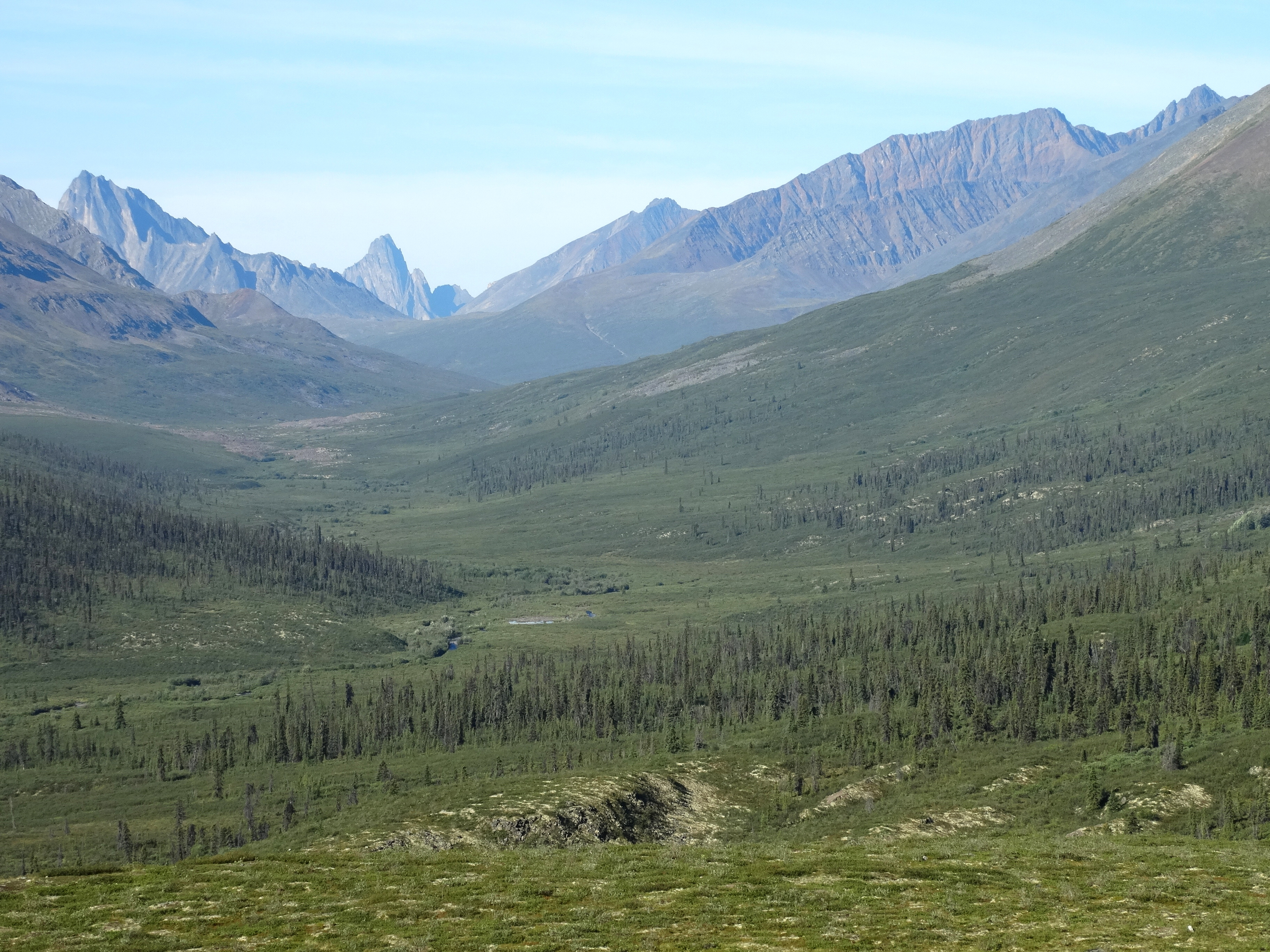
- Mt. Frank Rae summit in upper right corner

Highest point
- Elevation: 2,360 m (7,740 ft)
- Prominence: 1,365 m (4,478 ft)
- Listing: Mountains of Yukon; North America isolated peaks 88th; Canada most isolated peaks 26th
- Coordinates: 64°28′13″N 138°33′18″W

Geography
- Location within Yukon
- Location: Yukon, Canada
- Parent range: Ogilvie Mountains
- Topo map: NTS 116B7 Tombstone River

Mount Frank Rae (2,360 m) is the highest mountain of the Ogilvie Mountains in central Yukon, Canada, located 62 km (39 mi) northeast of Dawson City.
