= Tombstone Territorial Park =

Territorial park in the Yukon Territory, Canada

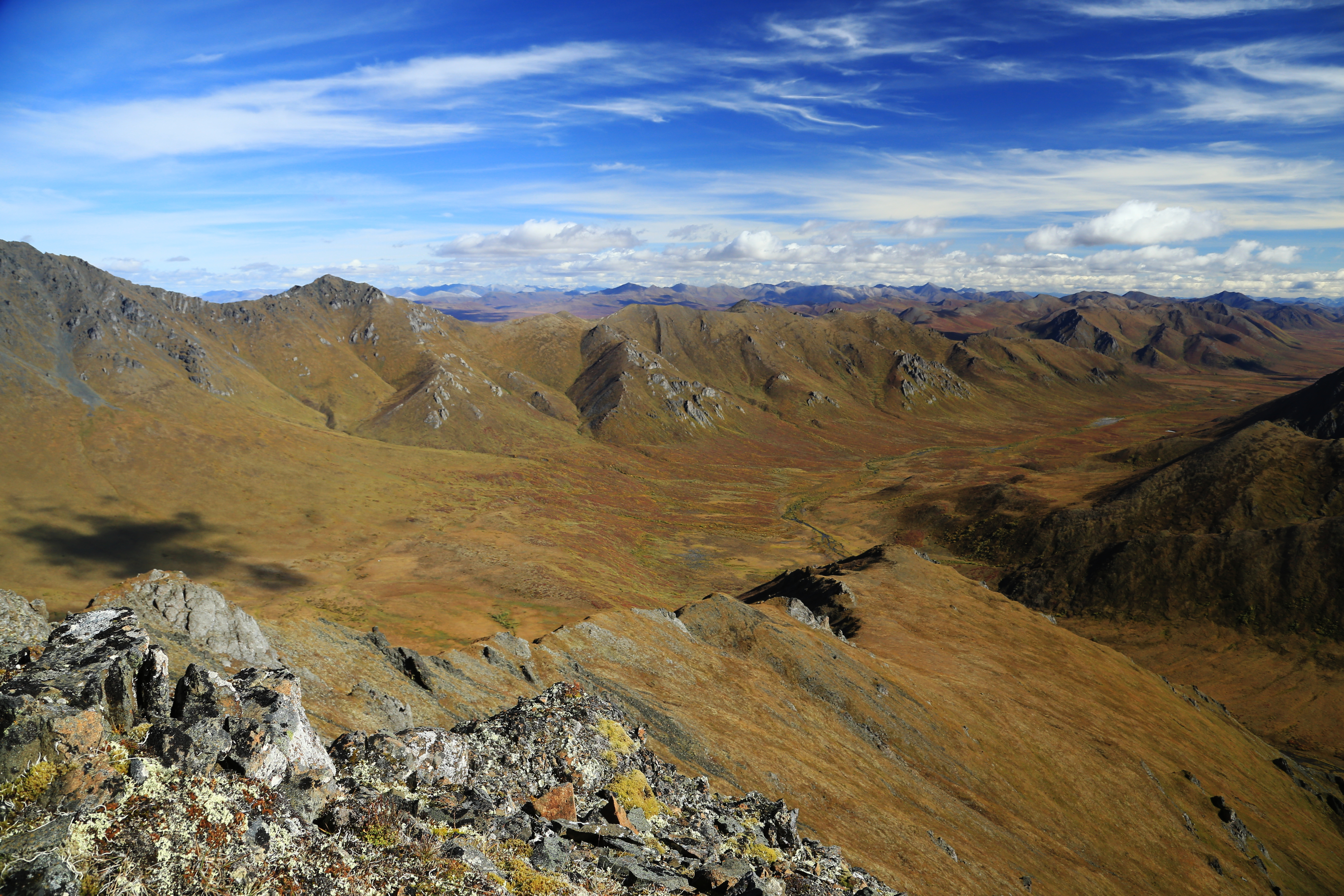
- The northern parts of Tombstone, west of the Highway

- Location within Canada
- Location: Yukon, Canada
- Nearest city: Dawson City
- Coordinates: 64.08286°N 138.51090°W
- Governing body: Territorial

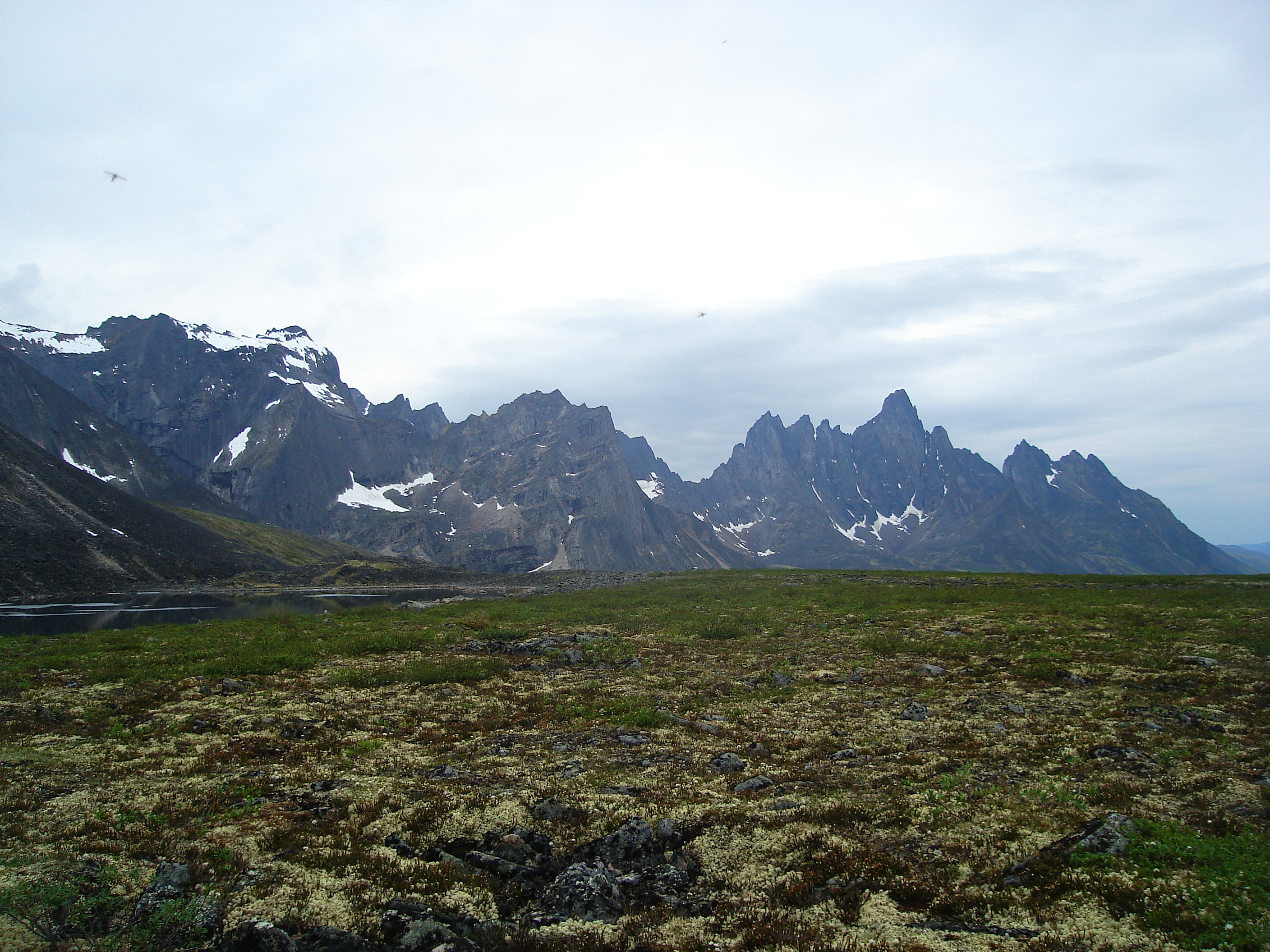
Tombstone Mountain

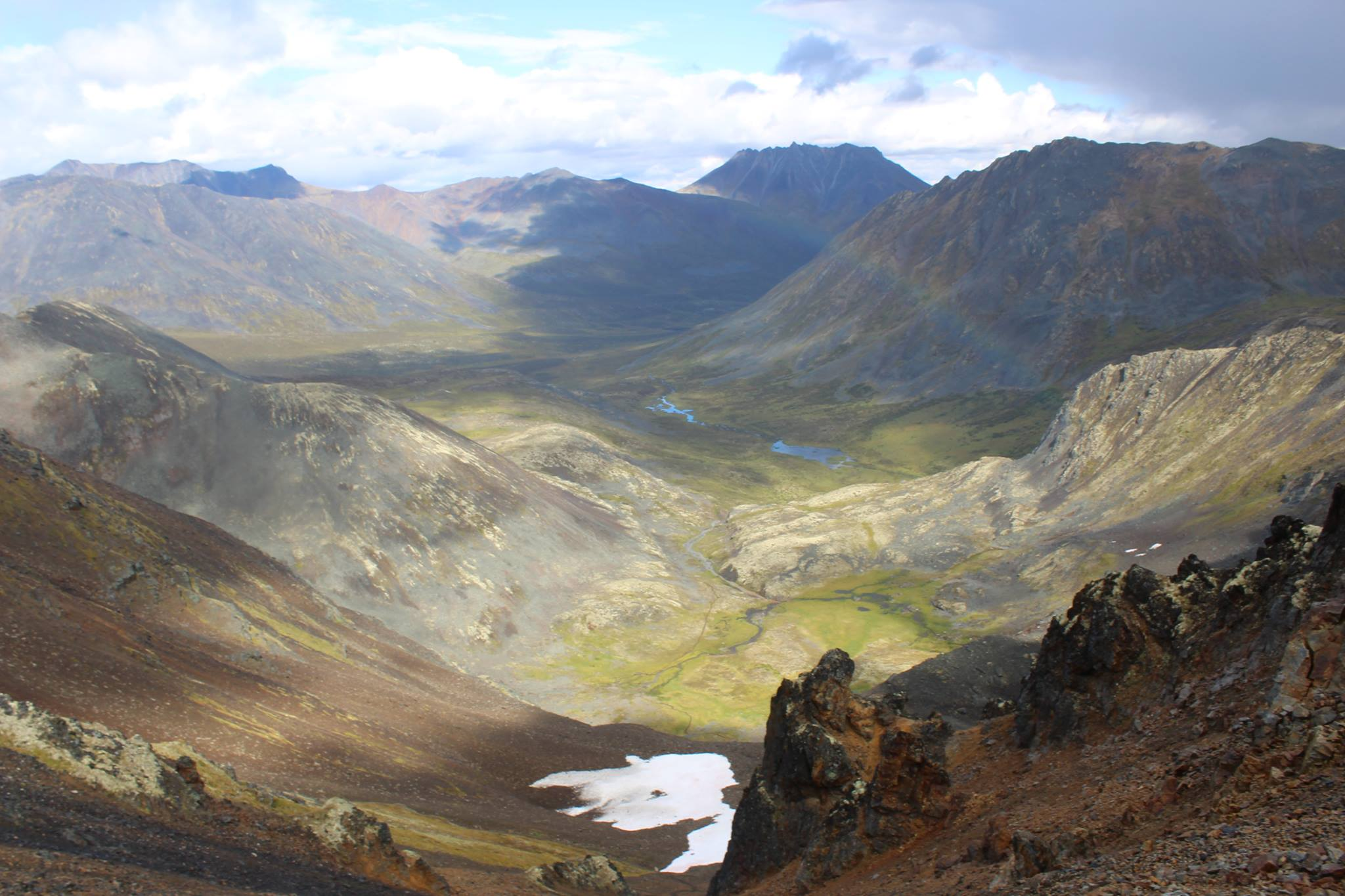
Glissade Pass August 2016

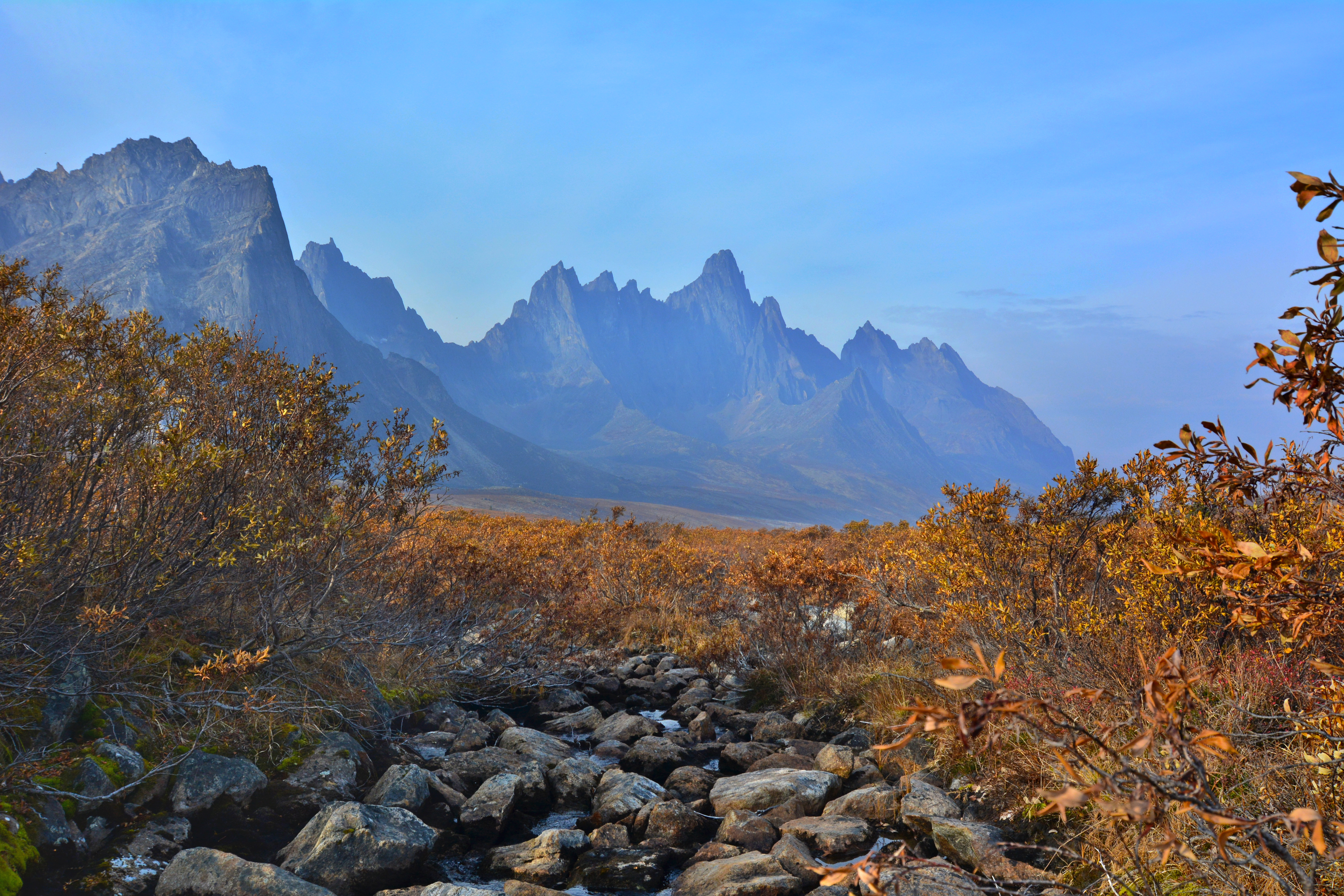
A View of Tombstone Mountain

Tombstone Territorial Park is a territorial park in the Yukon, one of three territories in Canada. It is in central Yukon, near the southern end of the Dempster Highway, stretching from the 50.5 to the 115.0 kilometre marker. The park protects over 2100 square kilometres of rugged peaks, permafrost landforms and wildlife, including sections of the Blackstone Uplands and the Ogilvie Mountains. The Park is named for Tombstone Mountain's resemblance to a grave marker.

The area is geologically unique and ecologically diverse. It is bisected by the divide separating waters flowing into the Yukon River and eventually the Bering Sea from those flowing into the Mackenzie River and eventually the Beaufort Sea. The divide is part of an igneous belt of granitic and syenitic rock, known as the Cretaceous Tombstone Suite, that stretches from Fairbanks, Alaska, to the Ross River. Multiple glaciations intruded into the region from the east, separating it from areas to the north and west, known as Beringia, that were not glaciated, and creating a pocket of rugged terrain. North of the divide, the margins of prior glaciations give way to much gentler permafrost landforms that escaped glaciation, with ice margin formations such as pingos, moraines, ice-wedge, polygons, and frost mounds.

The park protects diverse flora and fauna, including five big game species Dall's sheep, two species of caribou, moose, black bears, grizzly bears, and numerous smaller mammals. The Park is also a birders' delight, with about 150 bird species having been identified.

Conservation efforts began in 1972 when scientists identified two sensitive sites. Two years later Canada's Department of Indian and Northern Affairs identified an area to be protected from development, in light of the building of the Dempster Highway, to protect the views of Tombstone Mountain. By 2000 the Park was created, a legacy of the land settlement agreement with the Trʼondëk Hwëchʼin First Nation, with a mandate to preserve and enhance its "physical, biological, archaeological and cultural values." The park is jointly administered by the territorial government and the Tr’ondëk Hwëch’in First Nation.

Notable features are Mount Monolith, Tombstone Mountain, and Glissade Pass. The scenic attractiveness of the Park, in particular, has attracted growing numbers of visitors from all parts of the world, with tourism operators now offering excursions through, and into, the Park. Numerous hiking trails intrude into the park from the Dempster corridor (a 1-km strip alongside the highway exempt from the park). Along this strip is an interpretive centre, open in summer, which provides visitors with necessary resources for accessing the backcountry and interpretive programs for understanding it, as well as several car camping sites. There are three designated backcountry campgrounds: Grizzly, Divide, and Talus Lakes.

The park's most imposing feature, Mt. Tombstone, was first climbed by Martyn Williams, Jurg Hofer, and Liz Hofer on June 21, 1973.
