= Tombstone (mountain) =

Summit in Oregon

Coordinates: 42°16′58″N 122°45′12″W

Tombstone is a summit in the U.S. state of Oregon. The elevation is 3,215 feet (980 m).

Tombstone was so named on account of its gray rock formation.
