= Tombstone Mountain (Yukon) =

Mountain in Yukon, Canada

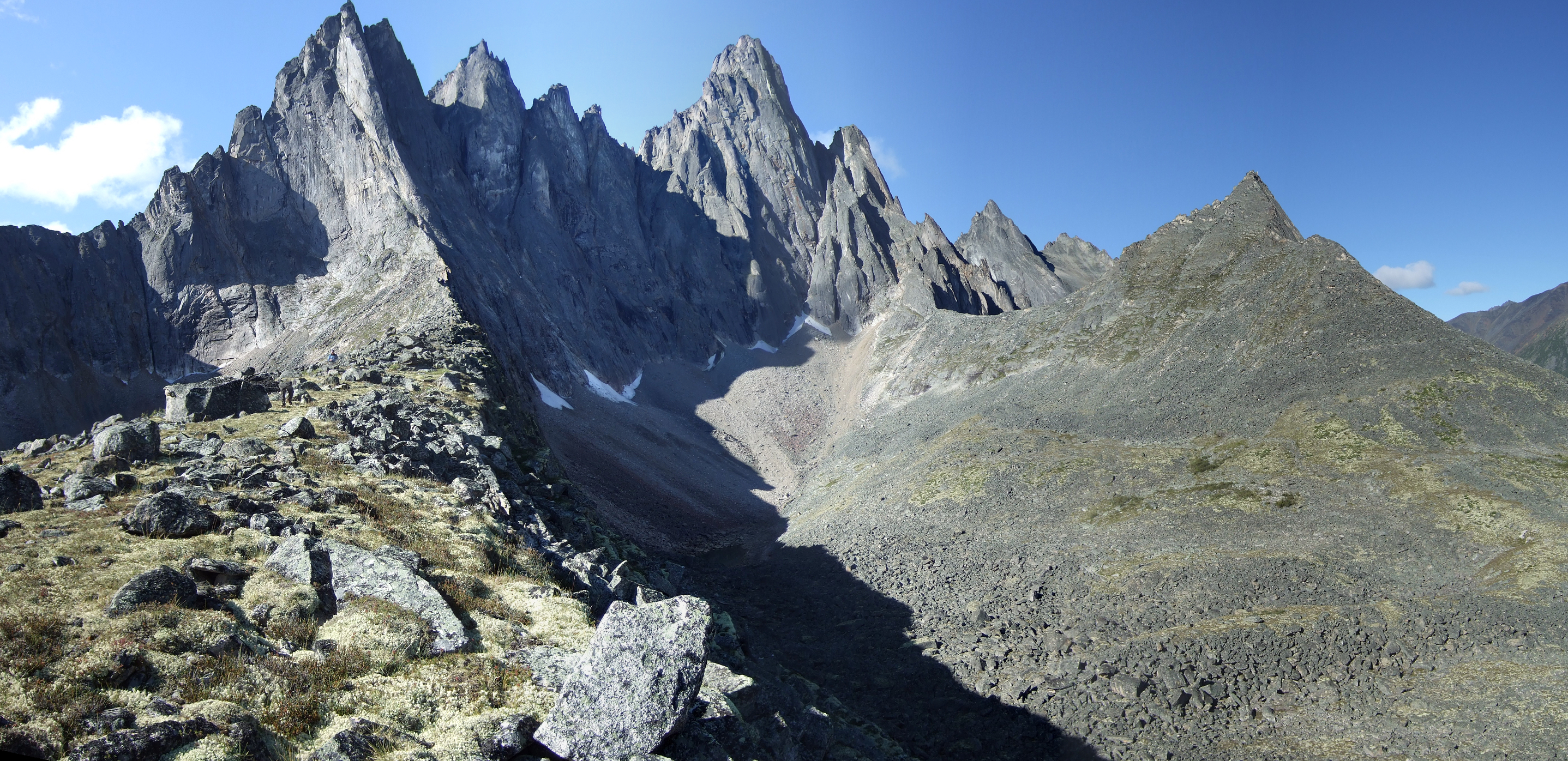
- Summit centered, northeast aspect

Highest point
- Elevation: 2,192 m (7,192 ft)
- Prominence: 652 m (2,139 ft)
- Parent peak: Mount Frank Rae
- Isolation: 4.98 km (3.09 mi)
- Coordinates: 64°24′19″N 138°40′55″W

Naming
- Etymology: Tombstone

Geography
- Location within Yukon
- Interactive map of Tombstone Mountain
- Location: Yukon, Canada
- Protected area: Tombstone Territorial Park
- Parent range: Ogilvie Mountains; Tombstone Range
- Topo map: NTS 116B7 Tombstone River

Geology
- Rock age: Cretaceous
- Rock type(s): Granite, Syenite

Climbing
- First ascent: 1973

Tombstone Mountain is a mountain in Yukon, Canada.

== Description ==
Tombstone Mountain is a 2,192-metre-elevation (7,192-foot) summit located in the Ogilvie Mountains and within Tombstone Territorial Park. It ranks as the fourth-highest mountain in the Ogilvie Mountains. The remote peak is situated in the Tombstone River Valley and is set within the Yukon River watershed. Topographic relief is significant as the summit rises 1,090 metres (3,580 feet) above the Tombstone River in less than two kilometres (1.2 miles). The nearest road is the Dempster Highway 15 km (9 mi) to the southeast, and the nearest town is Dawson, 53 km (33 mi) to the southwest. Based on the Köppen climate classification, Tombstone Mountain is located in a subarctic climate zone with long, cold, winters, and short, mild summers. Winter temperatures can drop below −40 °C with wind chill factors below −50 °C.

== History ==
The first ascent of the summit was made on June 21, 1973, by Martyn Williams, Jürg Hofer, and Liz Hofer. The mountain's name refers to a resemblance to a grave marker. The toponym was officially adopted on March 30, 1981, by the Geographical Names Board of Canada.

== Gallery ==
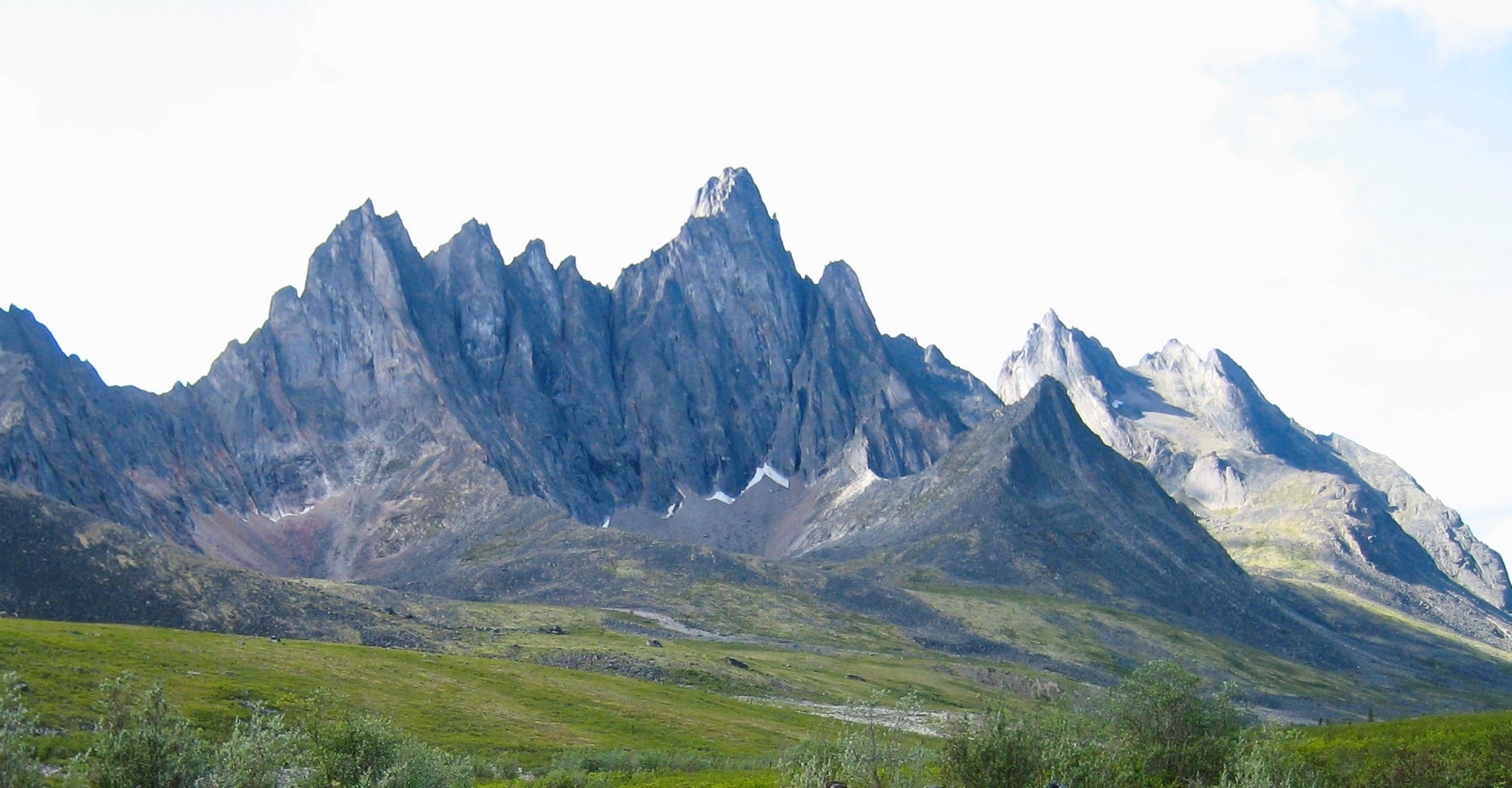
Northeast aspect

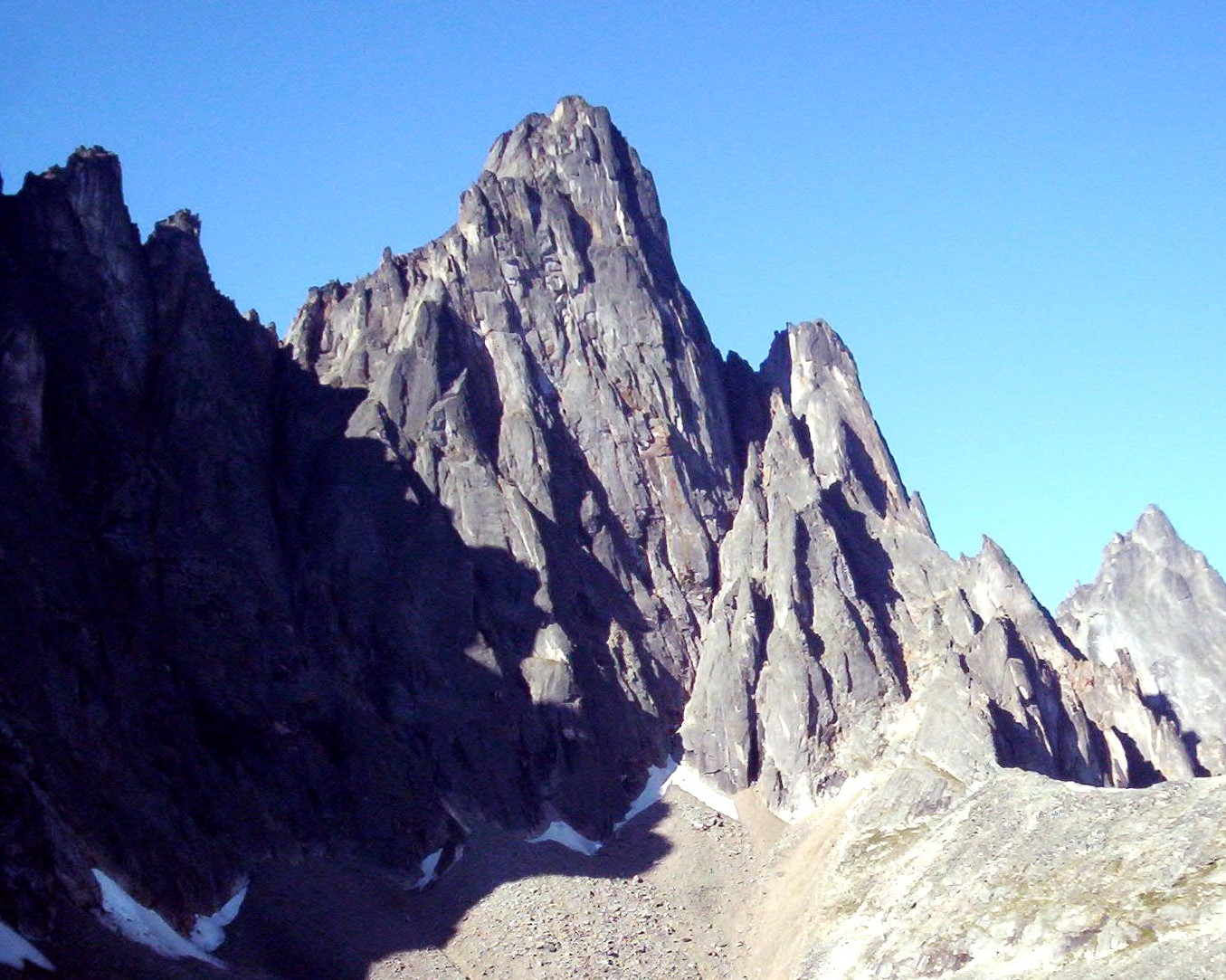

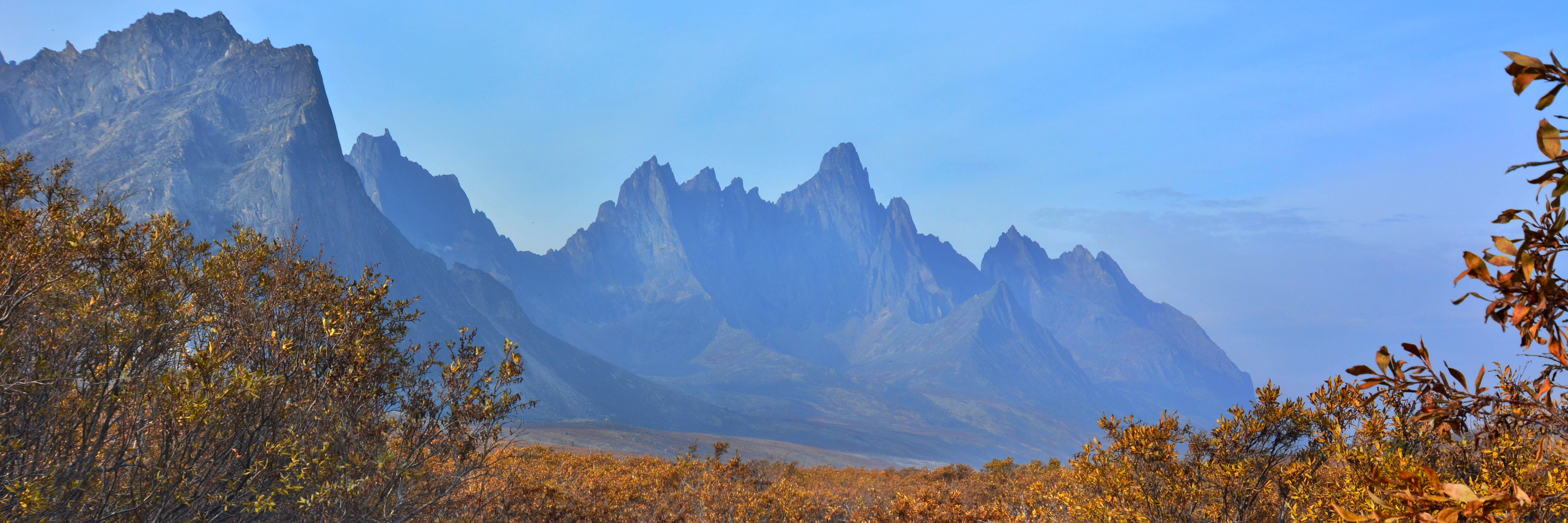

== See also ==
- List of mountains of Canada
- Geography of Yukon
