= Tombstone (manufacturing) =

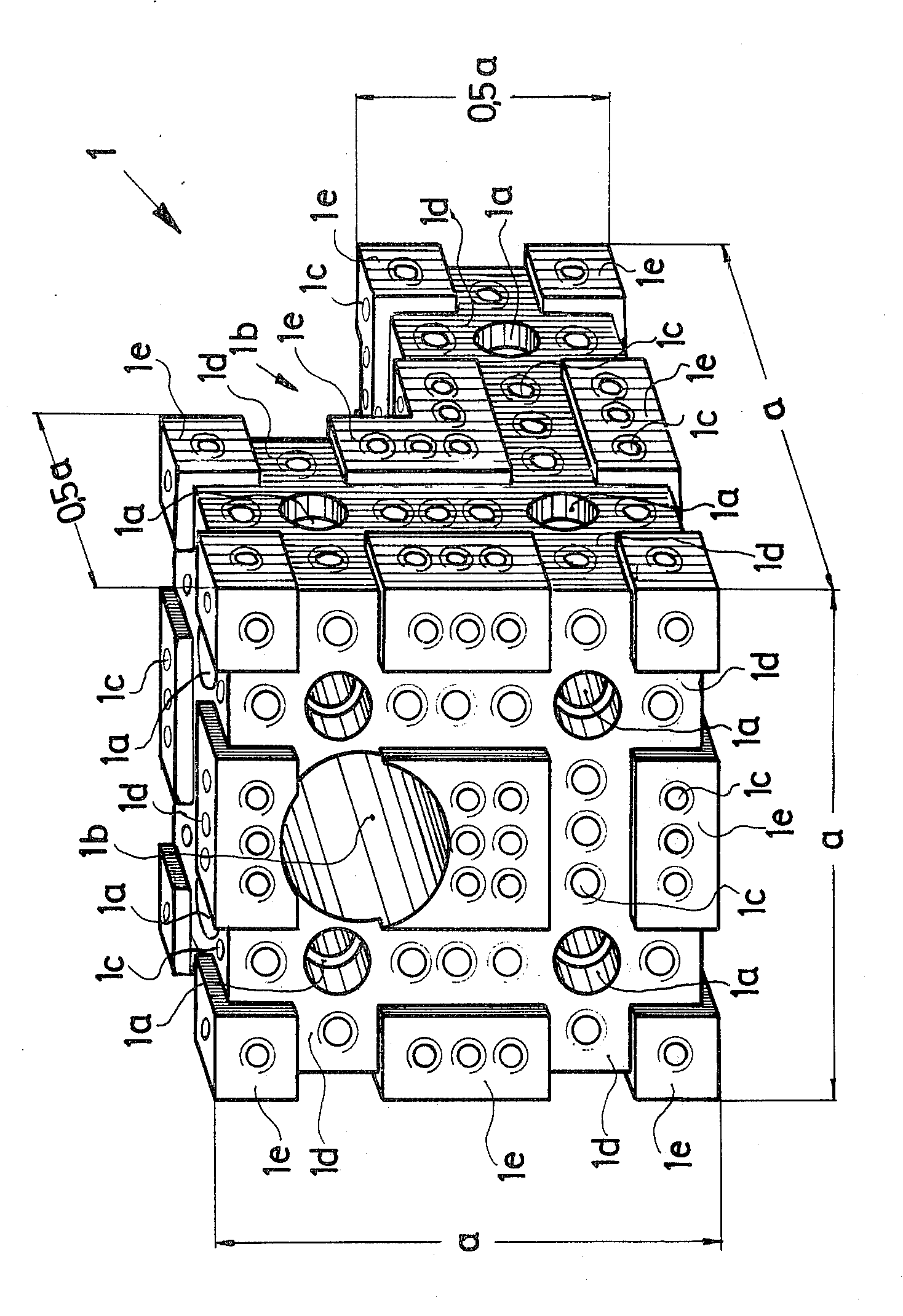
Patent diagram of a machining fixture block

A tombstone, also known as a pedestal-type fixture, tooling tower, tooling column or fixture block, is a fixture of two or more sides, onto which are mounted parts to be manufactured. Tombstones are typically used in automated systems; parts are loaded onto the tombstone so that robots may operate on one part, flip the tombstone, and operate on the next part until all processes are completed, then transport the entire tombstone to the next station.

The first tombstone type fixture was patented in 1971 by the Vereinigte Flugtechnische Werke.

Tombstones are used in agile manufacturing to facilitate quick and easy installation, scalability and reconfiguration.
