= Tombstone (financial industry) =

Type of print notice used in the financial industry

Tombstone finalizing the purchase of American Motors by Chrysler from Renault that was completed by Lazard in 1987

A tombstone is a type of print notice that is most often used in the financial industry to formally announce a particular transaction, such as an initial public offering or placement of stock of a company. They do not sell anything but provide information about offering of new stock or bonds by firms or municipalities, as well as details of mergers and acquisitions or a private placement.

== History ==
The Securities Act of 1933 required the publication of the tombstone advertisement to be printed in a newspaper and provide the barest of information on the transaction as the last step in the financial deal.

This public disclosure is made in a form listing the participants in a specified order according to their roles in underwriting or brokering the transaction. The lead underwriter or bookrunner appears in the upper left position, with co-lead managers to its right. Other firms are listed in brackets, grouped by underwriting risk, usually in alphabetical order. Bulge bracket firms appear most often at the top of the brackets. The order is so important that, in 1987, five top investment banks withdrew from a syndicate underwriting a $2.4 billion debt issue for the Farmers Home Administration, because they would have been listed under other, smaller regional banks.

Tombstone ads are considered by the SEC to "condition the market" for the securities, and thus are an offer even though the notice may not specifically describe the transaction. In public offerings, investment bankers can sell securities to investors only by means of a prospectus that has been filed with the SEC; therefore, tombstones announcing such transactions have a notice that they are "not an offer to sell or a solicitation to buy".

== Name ==
The name of the disclosure comes from the appearance of advertisement used, a 'tombstone ad', so called because the simple, centered text style with large amounts of whitespace and few if any images or other adornments make them resemble some of the tombstones found in cemeteries. Another view is that in the 19th century, financial notices were published in newspapers alongside birth and death notices.

Additional information, such as "photographs of investment properties or descriptions of the tax benefits of investments," are not allowed in financial tombstones. However, underwriting firms may use distinctive borders, typeface, and format to help differentiate their organization.

Among financial firms, and more specifically, the investment banking community, the term "tombstone" may also refer to a trophy or deal tombstone, known as a deal toy.
