= List of mountains of Yukon =

The Saint Elias Mountains in southwestern Yukon contain many of Canada's highest peaks, with Mount Logan being the highest in the country.

== List of mountains ==
Peak	Elevation		Range	Remarks
Peak	metres	feet	Range	Remarks
Alsek	2,716	8,911	Saint Elias Mountains	
Alverstone	4,420	14,500	Saint Elias Mountains	
Archibald	2,588	8,491	Saint Elias Mountains	
Augusta	4,289	14,072	Saint Elias Mountains	
Avalanche	4,228	13,871	Saint Elias Mountains	#20 in Yukon
Basement	2,706	8,878	Alsek Ranges	
Cairnes	2,810	9,220	Saint Elias Mountains	
Cook	4,194	13,760	Saint Elias Mountains	
Decoeli	2,332	7,651	Saint Elias Mountains	
Fox	2,404	7,887	Pelly Mountains	
Frank Rae	2,360	7,740	Ogilvie Mountains	
Grey Hunter	2,214	7,264	North Yukon Plateau Ranges	
Hubbard	4,557	14,951	Saint Elias Mountains	#10 in Canada
Kaskawulsh	2,969	9,741	Saint Elias Mountains	
Keele	2,972	9,751	Mackenzie Mountains	
Kennedy	4,250	13,940	Saint Elias Mountains	
King	5,173	16,972	Saint Elias Mountains	#4 in Canada
Kings Throne	1,990	6,530	Saint Elias Mountains	
Logan	5,959	19,551	Saint Elias Mountains	#1 in Canada
Lucania	5,226	17,146	Saint Elias Mountains	#3 in Canada
McArthur	4,344	14,252	Saint Elias Mountains	
Macdonald	2,760	9,060	Mackenzie Mountains	
Malaspina	3,776	12,388	Saint Elias Mountains	
Martha Black	2,512	8,241	Saint Elias Mountains	
Maxwell	3,010	9,880	Saint Elias Mountains	
Monolith	2,165	7,103	Ogilvie Mountains	
Mount Newton	4,200	13,800	Saint Elias Mountains	
Pinnacle Peak	3,714	12,185	Saint Elias Mountains	
Saint Elias	5,489	18,009	Saint Elias Mountains	#2 in Canada
Saskatchewan	3,500	11,500	Saint Elias Mountains	Unclimbed
Seattle	3,139	10,299	Saint Elias Mountains	
Sheep	1,953	6,407	Saint Elias Mountains	
Slaggard	4,742	15,558	Saint Elias Mountains	#8 in Canada
Steele	5,073	16,644	Saint Elias Mountains	#5 in Canada
Strickland	4,240	13,910	Saint Elias Mountains	
Tombstone	2,192	7,192	Ogilvie Mountains	
Turner	1,267	4,157		
Ulu	3,100	10,200	Saint Elias Mountains	
Vancouver	4,810	15,780	Saint Elias Mountains	#7 in Canada
Walsh	4,507	14,787	Saint Elias Mountains	
Wood	4,852	15,919	Saint Elias Mountains	#6 in Canada
Worthington	2,168	7,113	Saint Elias Mountains	
