= Mount Decoeli =

Mountain in Yukon, Canada

- Location within Yukon

Highest point
- Elevation: 2,332 m (7,651 ft)
- Prominence: 427 m (1,401 ft)
- Parent peak: Mount Archibald (3020 m)
- Listing: Mountains of Yukon
- Coordinates: 60°50′13″N 137°53′18″W

Geography
- Country: Canada
- Territory: Yukon
- Parent range: Saint Elias Mountains
- Topo map: NTS 115A13 Kloo Lake

Climbing
- Easiest route: Scrambling via southeast face and south ridge

Mount Decoeli is a 2,332-metre (7,651-foot) pyramidal peak located in the Kluane Ranges of the Saint Elias Mountains in Yukon, Canada. The mountain is situated 23 km (14 mi) northwest of Haines Junction, 21.4 km (13 mi) east of Mount Cairnes, and can be seen from the Alaska Highway midway between the two. Its nearest higher peak is Mount Archibald, 6 km (3.7 mi) to the south. The mountain's name was officially adopted August 12, 1980, by the Geographical Names Board of Canada. James J. McArthur was a Canadian surveyor and mountaineer who undertook extensive surveying in the Yukon during his later years. In 1908 he made the first ascent of Williams Peak accompanied by Edmond Treau de Coeli (1873–1963). Decoeli is pronounced deh-coh-lie. To the Southern Tutchone people, the mountain is known as Nàday Gän, meaning Dried Lynx Mountain.

Climbing the peak is a long strenuous day hike of 1,332-metre (4,370-foot) elevation gain over a distance of 18 km (11 mi) round trip, with a scramble via the south face and south ridge. On a clear day, the summit offers views into Kluane National Park of giants such as Mount Logan, Mount Vancouver, and Mount Kennedy. A repeater is installed at the summit.

== Climate ==
Based on the Köppen climate classification, Mount Decoeli is located in a subarctic climate zone with long, cold, snowy winters, and mild summers. The annual average temperature in the neighborhood is -6 °C. The warmest month is July, when the average temperature is 8 °C, and the coldest is December when temperatures can drop below −20 °C with wind chill factors below −30 °C. Precipitation runoff from the peak and meltwater from its rock glacier drains into tributaries of the Kaskawulsh River.

== See also ==
- Geography of Yukon
