= Pinnacle Peak (Yukon) =

Summit of the Saint Elias Mountains in Kluane National Park of Yukon, Canada

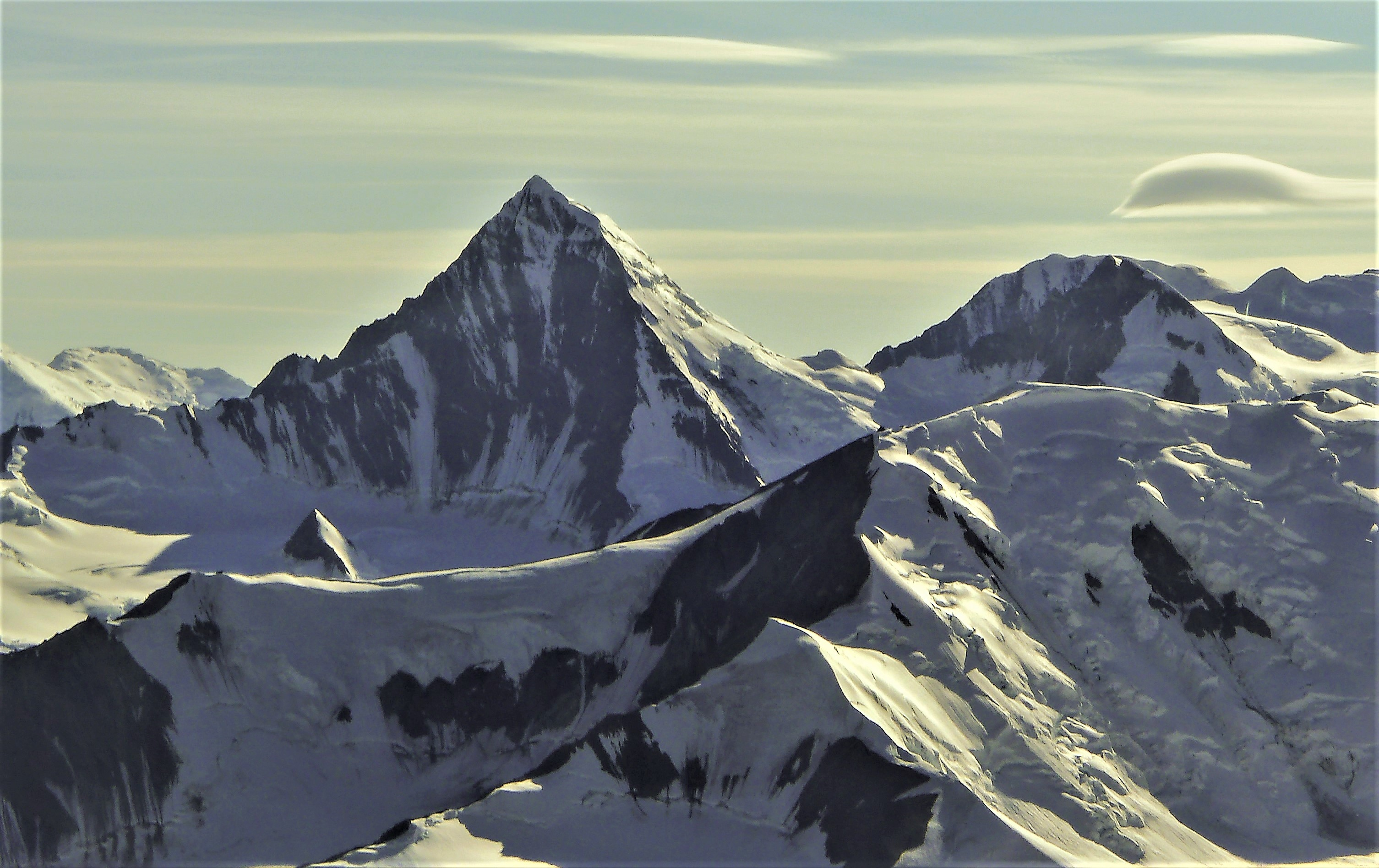
- Pinnacle Peak, northeast aspect

Highest point
- Elevation: 3,714 m (12,185 ft)
- Prominence: 880 m (2,890 ft)
- Parent peak: Peak 12401
- Isolation: 11.57 km (7.19 mi)
- Coordinates: 60°27′43″N 138°58′33″W

Geography
- Location within Yukon
- Location: Kluane National Park; Yukon, Canada
- Parent range: Saint Elias Mountains
- Topo map: NTS 115B7 Mount Kennedy

Climbing
- First ascent: April 20, 1965
- Easiest route: West Ridge

Pinnacle Peak is a remote 3,714-meter-elevation (12,185-foot) mountain summit of the Saint Elias Mountains, in Kluane National Park of Yukon, Canada. It ranks as the 37th-highest officially named mountain in Canada. It is situated at the head of the South Arm of the Kaskawulsh Glacier. Topographic relief is significant as the summit rises 1,500 meters (4,900 feet) above the Dusty Glacier in 3.5 kilometers (2.2 miles). Neighbors include Mount Kennedy, 14 km to the south, and Mount Alverstone, 14 km to the south-southwest.

== Climate ==
Based on the Köppen climate classification, Pinnacle Peak is located in a subarctic climate zone with long, cold, winters, and short, cool summers. Winter temperatures can drop below −30 °C with wind chill factors below −50 °C. This climate supports the Kaskawulsh, Dusty, and Lowell glaciers surrounding the peak.

== Climbing ==
The first ascent of the summit was made April 20, 1965, led by Ed Boulton, along with Alvin Randall, Ome Daiber, Dave McBrayer, Bob Booher, and Arnie Bloomer via the west ridge. In May 1974, Harry Bowron, Hugh Ewing, Kirk Keogh, and Bruce Carson made first ascents of the east and north ridges. The third ascent took place in 1990, and was the first by Canadian mountaineers, a group which included Bill McKenzie, Bill Geddes, Roger Wallis, Glynis Peters, Yan Huckendubler, Gord Gruber, and Joe Prokopiak.

== See also ==
- List of mountains of Canada
- Geography of Yukon
