= Ulu Mountain =

Mountain in Yukon, Canada

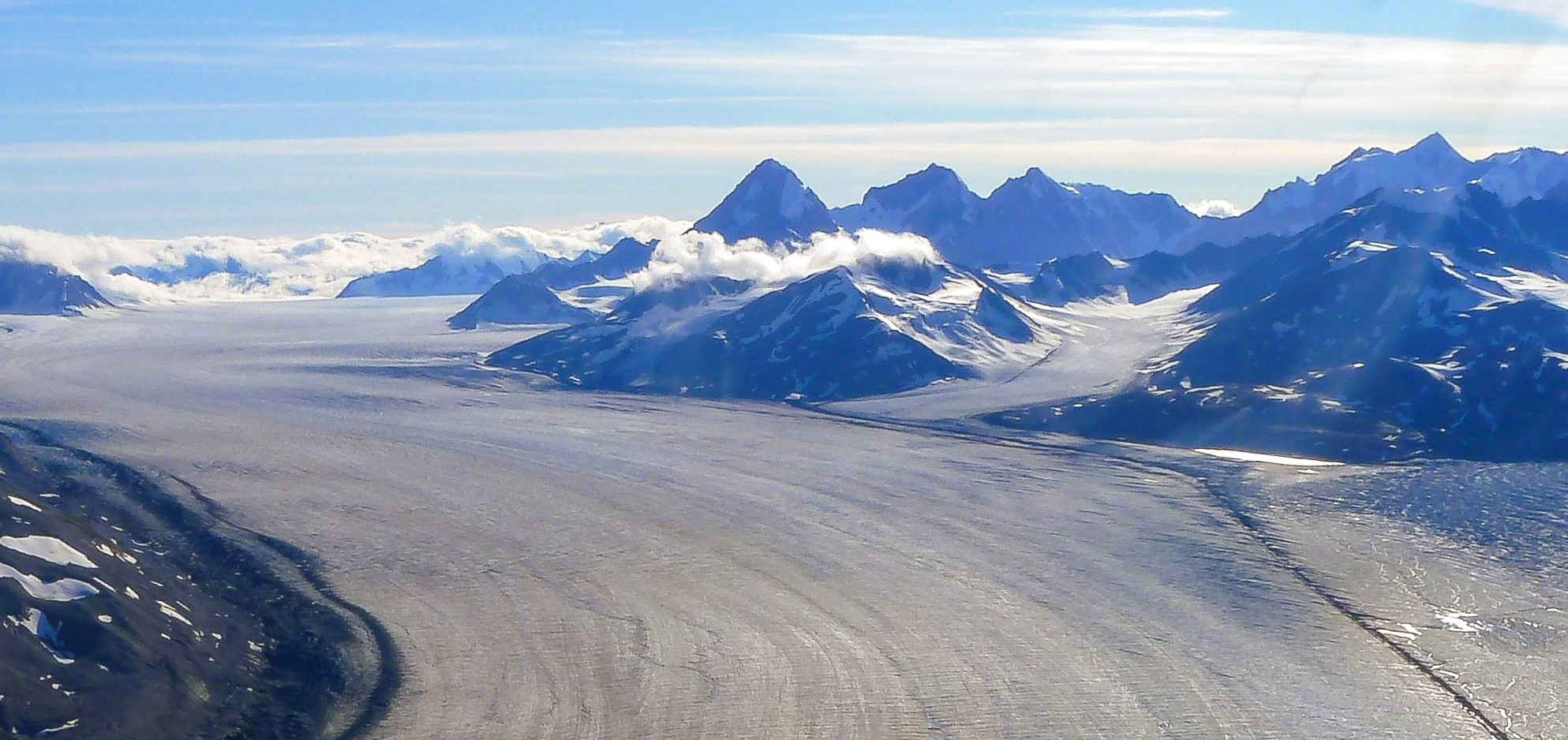
- Ulu centered on skyline, northeast aspect

Highest point
- Elevation: 3,100 m (10,171 ft)
- Prominence: 600 m (1,969 ft)
- Parent peak: Peak 10269
- Isolation: 4.59 km (2.85 mi)
- Coordinates: 60°13′37″N 138°46′17″W

Naming
- Etymology: Ulu

Geography
- Location within Yukon
- Location: Yukon, Canada
- Protected area: Kluane National Park
- Parent range: Saint Elias Mountains
- Topo map: NTS 115B2 Ulu Mountain

Climbing
- First ascent: 1972
- Easiest route: Expedition climbing

Ulu Mountain is a mountain in Yukon, Canada.

== Description ==
Ulu Mountain is a 3,100-metre-elevation (10,200-foot) mountain located in the Saint Elias Mountains and within Kluane National Park. It ranks as the 68th-highest mountain in Yukon. The remote peak is situated along the Lowell Glacier and is set within the Alsek River watershed. Topographic relief is significant as the summit rises 1,575 metres (5,167 feet) above the Lowell Glacier in two kilometres (1.2 miles). Neighbors include Mount Kennedy, 17 km (11 mi) to the northwest and Mount Hubbard is 19 km (12 mi) to the northwest. The nearest town is Haines Junction, Yukon, 91 km (57 mi) to the northeast.

== Climate ==
Based on the Köppen climate classification, Ulu Mountain is located in a tundra climate zone with long, cold, winters, and short, cool summers. Most weather fronts originate in the Pacific Ocean and travel toward the Saint Elias Mountains where they are forced upward by the range (orographic lift), causing them to drop their moisture in the form of rain or snowfall. As a result, the mountains experience high precipitation, especially during the winter months in the form of snowfall. Winter temperatures can drop below −20 °C with wind chill factors below −30 °C. This climate supports the Cathedral Glacier and Lowell Glacier surrounding the peak.

== History ==
The first ascent of the summit was made on March 6, 1972, via the east face, led by Monty E. Alford, along with Martyn Williams, Scott Foster, Jim Boyde, and Louis Lambert. The mountain's name refers to the Ulu, a utility knife used by the Inuit. The toponym was officially adopted on February 3, 1981, by the Geographical Names Board of Canada.

== See also ==
- List of mountains of Canada
- Geography of Yukon
