= Mount Archibald =

Mountain in Yukon, Canada

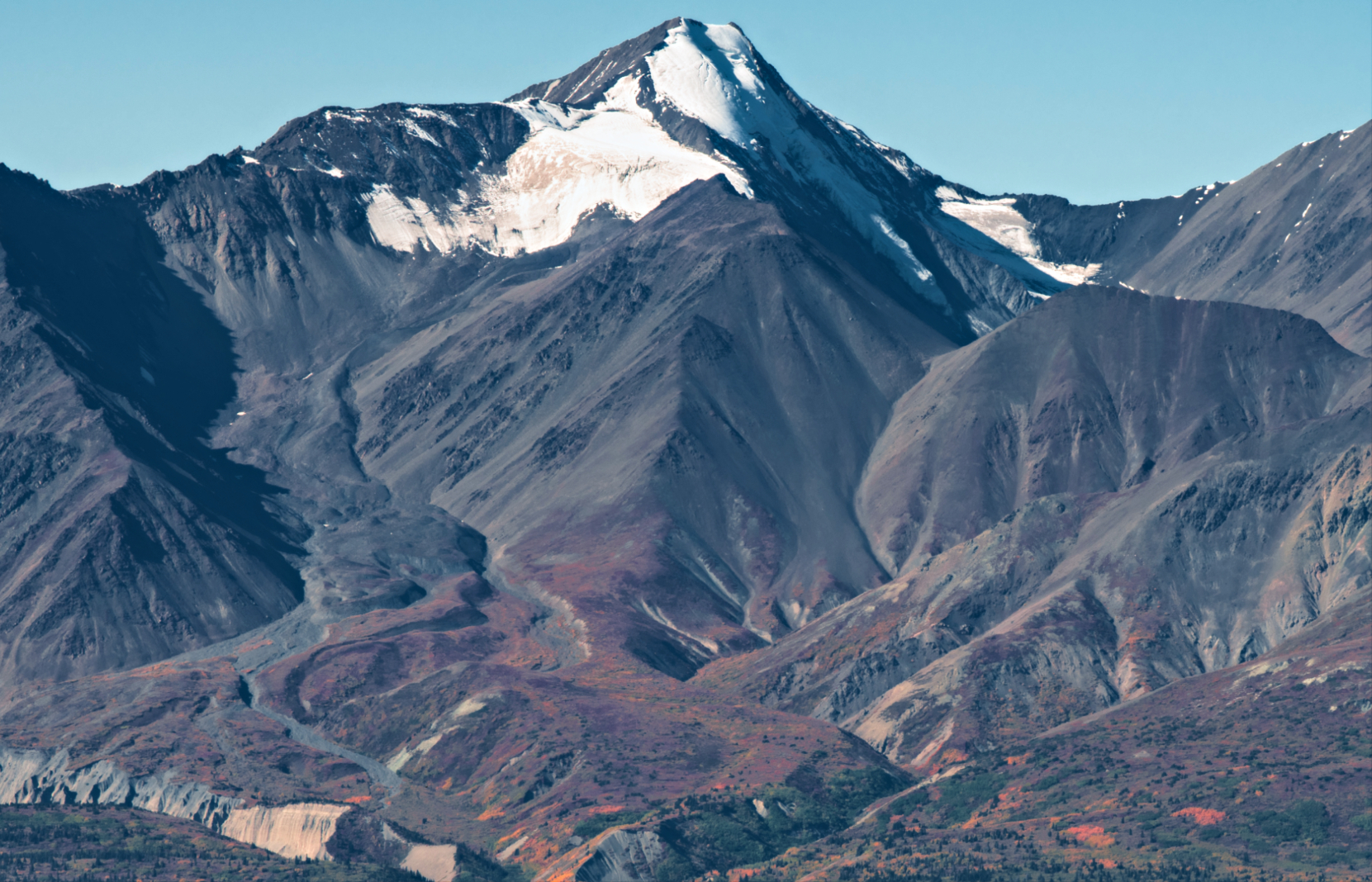
- Mount Archibald, east aspect

Highest point
- Elevation: 2,588 m (8,491 ft)
- Prominence: 1,678 m (5,505 ft)
- Parent peak: Mount Cairnes (2810 m)
- Listing: Mountains of Yukon; Ultras of Canada 82nd; Canada highest major peaks 112th
- Coordinates: 60°47′03″N 137°52′27″W

Naming
- Etymology: Edgar Archibald

Geography
- Location within Yukon
- Location: Yukon, Canada
- Parent range: Kluane Ranges; Saint Elias Mountains
- Topo map: NTS 115A13 Kloo Lake

Mount Archibald is a prominent 2,588-metre (8,491-foot) mountain summit located in the Kluane Ranges of the Saint Elias Mountains in Yukon, Canada. The mountain is situated 21 km (13 mi) west of Haines Junction, 5.9 km (4 mi) south of Mount Decoeli, and 27 km (17 mi) east-southeast of Mount Cairnes, which is the nearest higher peak. Set on the boundary line of Kluane National Park, Archibald can be seen from the Alaska Highway, weather permitting. The mountain was named after Edgar Archibald (1885-1968), a Canadian agricultural scientist. The mountain's name was officially adopted August 12, 1980, by the Geographical Names Board of Canada. On a clear day, the summit offers views deep into Kluane National Park of giants such as Mt. Logan, Mt. Vancouver, and Mt. Kennedy.

== Climate ==
Based on the Köppen climate classification, Mount Archibald is located in a subarctic climate zone with long, cold, snowy winters, and mild summers. The annual average temperature in the neighborhood is -6 °C. The warmest month is July, when the average temperature is 8 °C, and the coldest is December when temperatures can drop below −20 °C with wind chill factors below −30 °C. Precipitation runoff from the peak and meltwater from its surrounding glaciers drains into tributaries of the Alsek River.

== See also ==
- Geography of Yukon
