= Mount Alverstone =

Mountain on the border of Canada and Alaska

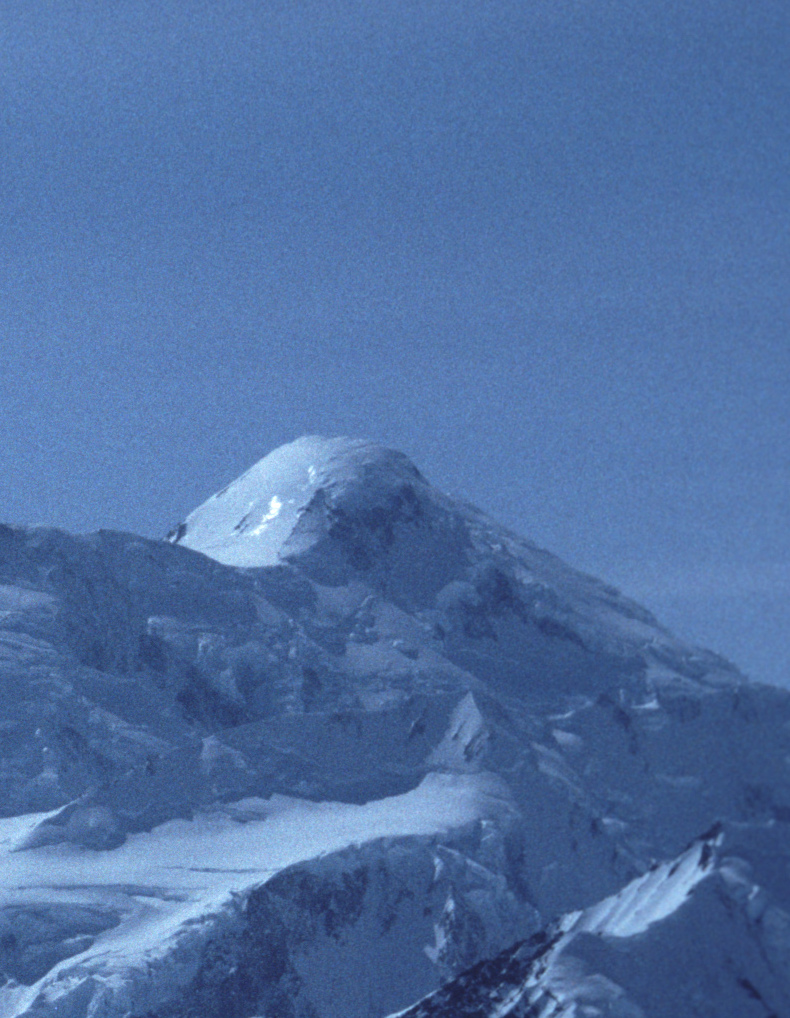

Highest point
- Elevation: 4,420 m (14,500 ft); NAVD88
- Prominence: 594 m (1950 ft)
- Parent peak: Mount Hubbard
- Isolation: 3.62 km (2.25 mi)
- Listing: Mountains of Yukon; North America highest peaks 25th; Canada highest major peaks 12th; US highest major peaks 12th
- Coordinates: 60°21′06″N 139°04′31″W

Geography
- Location within Alaska Location within Yukon
- Location: Yakutat City and Borough, Alaska, U.S. / Yukon, Canada
- Parent range: Saint Elias Mountains
- Topo map(s): USGS Mount Saint Elias B-3; NTS 115B6 Mount Alverstone

Climbing
- First ascent: 1951 by Walter Wood, Peter Wood, Robert Bates, Nicholas Clifford
- Easiest route: glacier/snow/ice climb

Mount Alverstone or Boundary Peak 180, is a high peak in the Saint Elias Mountains, on the border between Alaska and Yukon. It shares a large massif with the higher Mount Hubbard to the south and the slightly lower Mount Kennedy to the east. The summit of Mount Alverstone marks a sharp turn in the Alaska/Canada border; the border goes south from this point toward the Alaska panhandle and west toward Mount Saint Elias.

The mountain was named in 1908 for Lord Richard Everard Webster Alverstone, Lord Chief Justice of England, 1900–13, and U.S. Boundary Commissioner in 1903. He served on various arbitration commissions including the one dealing with the Bering Sea Fur seal controversy. In the Alaska boundary dispute in 1903, his vote was the deciding one against Canadian claims.

== Climbing ==
Mount Alverstone was first climbed in 1951 by a party led by Walter Wood, during an expedition that also made the first ascent of Mount Hubbard. The successful climbs were tinged by tragedy when, upon returning from the peaks, Wood learned that his wife Foresta and daughter Valerie had died in a plane crash nearby along with their pilot. Mount Foresta, near Mount Alverstone, is named in her honor.

== See also ==
- List of mountain peaks of North America
  - List of mountain peaks of Canada
  - List of mountain peaks of the United States
- List of Boundary Peaks of the Alaska-British Columbia/Yukon border
