= Sheep Mountain (Yukon) =

Summit of the Saint Elias Mountains in Kluane National Park of Yukon, Canada

- Thechàl Dhâl
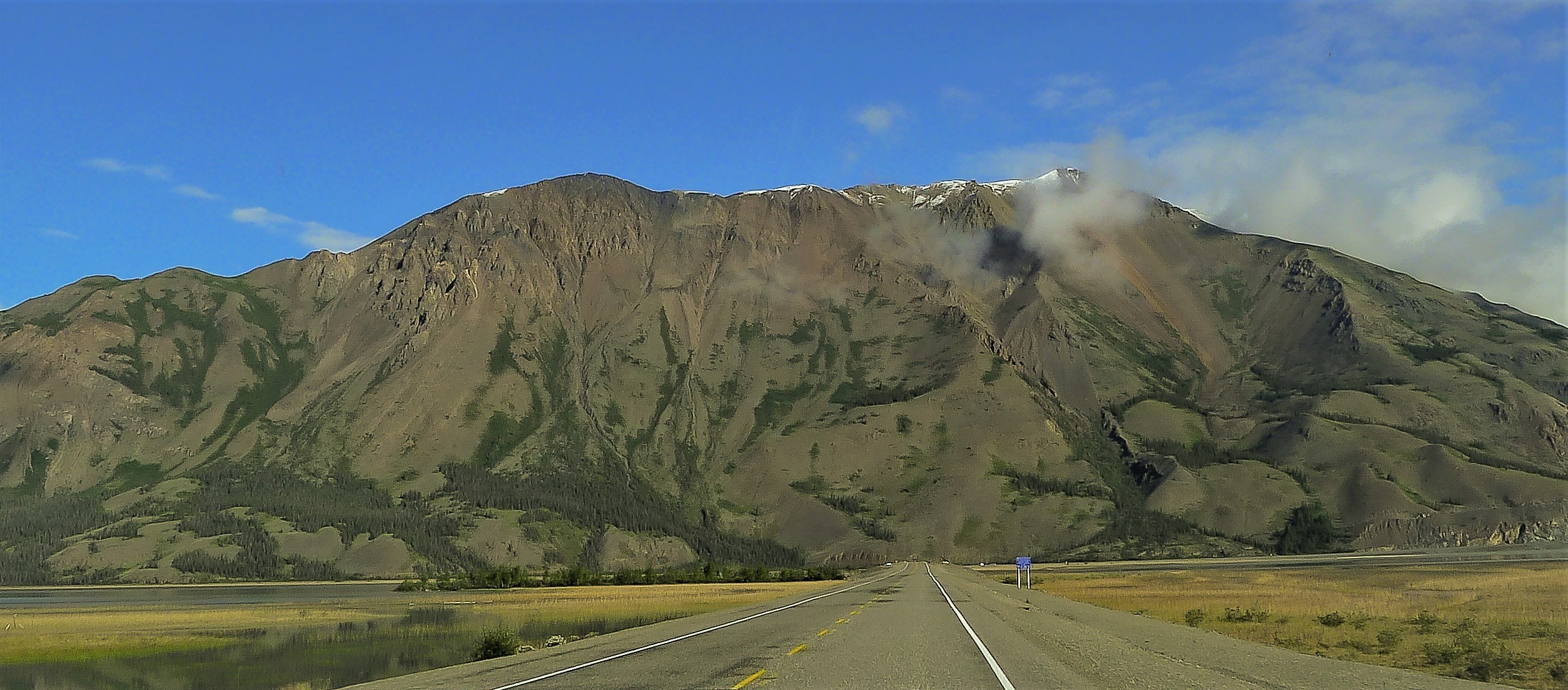
- Southeast aspect

Highest point
- Elevation: 1,953 m (6,407 ft)
- Prominence: 244 m (801 ft)
- Parent peak: Mount Wallace (2347 m)
- Isolation: 1.46 km (0.91 mi)
- Coordinates: 61°02′03″N 138°32′46″W

Geography
- Location within Yukon
- Interactive map of Sheep Mountain
- Location: Yukon, Canada
- Parent range: Saint Elias Mountains
- Topo map: NTS 115G2 Congdon Creek

Climbing
- Easiest route: class 2 hiking

Sheep Mountain is a 1,953-metre (6,407-foot) mountain summit of the Saint Elias Mountains, in Kluane National Park of Yukon, Canada. It is known as Thechàl Dhâl by the Southern Tutchone people, meaning "Skin Scraper Mountain", referring to the thechàl, a flat stone scraper that was used to prepare animal hides. Sheep Mountain is habitat for Dall sheep, and was once a favorite sheep hunting area for the Southern Tutchone before the park was established. The mountain is a prominent landmark along the Alaska Highway, and topographic relief is significant as the summit rises 1,140 meters (3,740 feet) above the Thechàl Dhâl Visitor Centre at Kluane Lake in 2.5 kilometers (1.6 miles). The mountain can be climbed via an 11 km (6.8 mi) loop which gains 1,310 meters of elevation, part of which is on the Sheep Creek Trail, one of the most popular hikes in Kluane Park. The route provides good opportunities to see Dall sheep, which the mountain is named for. The summit offers views up the Slims River valley to Mount Maxwell, south to Vulcan Mountain, and 2.4 km (1.5 mi) northwest to Mount Wallace, which is the nearest higher neighbor.

== Climate ==
Based on the Köppen climate classification, Sheep Mountain is located in a subarctic climate zone with long, cold, winters, and short, cool summers. Temperatures can drop below −30 °C with wind chill factors below −50 °C. The months June through August offer the most favorable weather for viewing and climbing. Precipitation runoff from the mountain drains east into Kluane Lake, the largest lake contained entirely within Yukon.

== Gallery ==
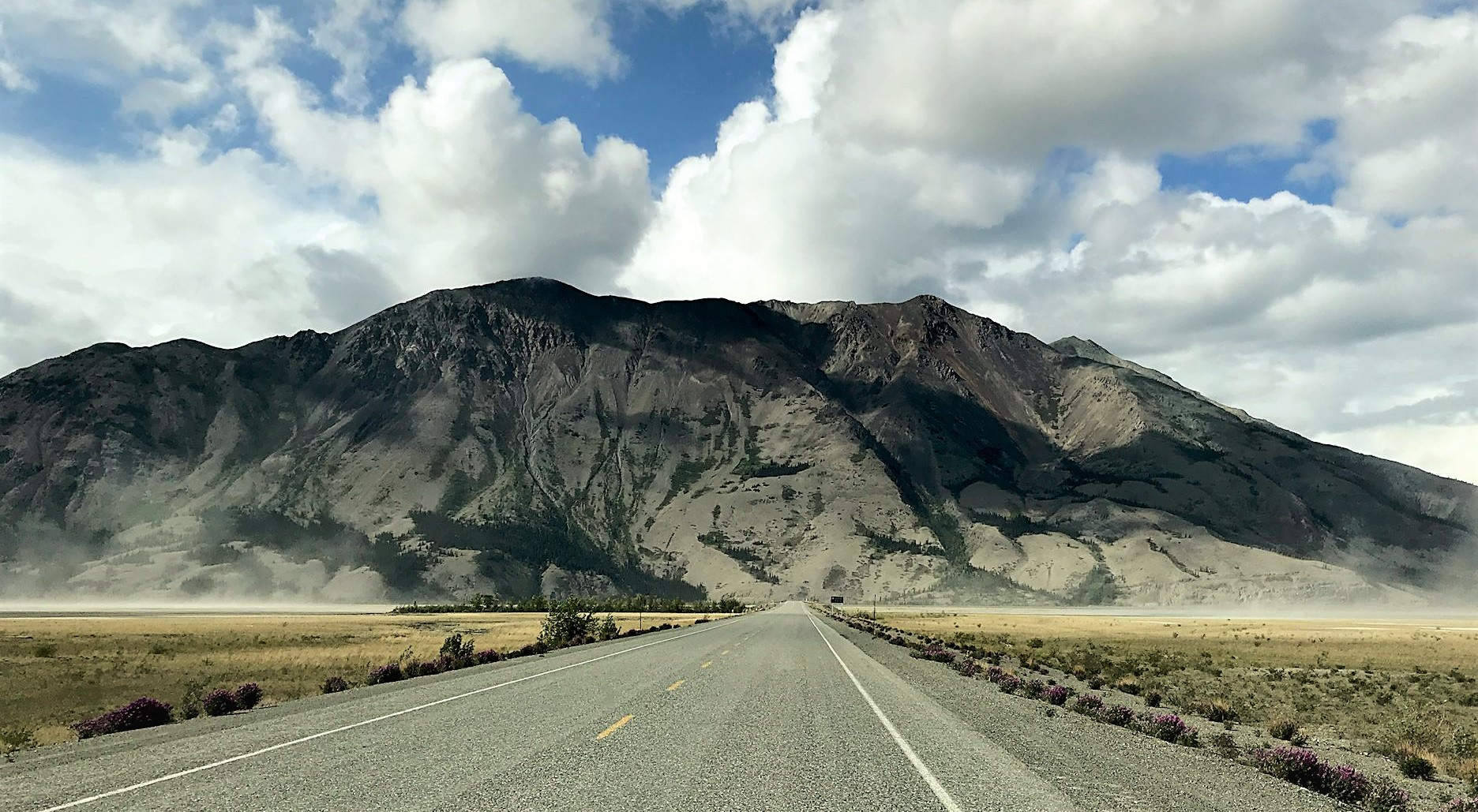
Sheep Mountain from Alaska Highway

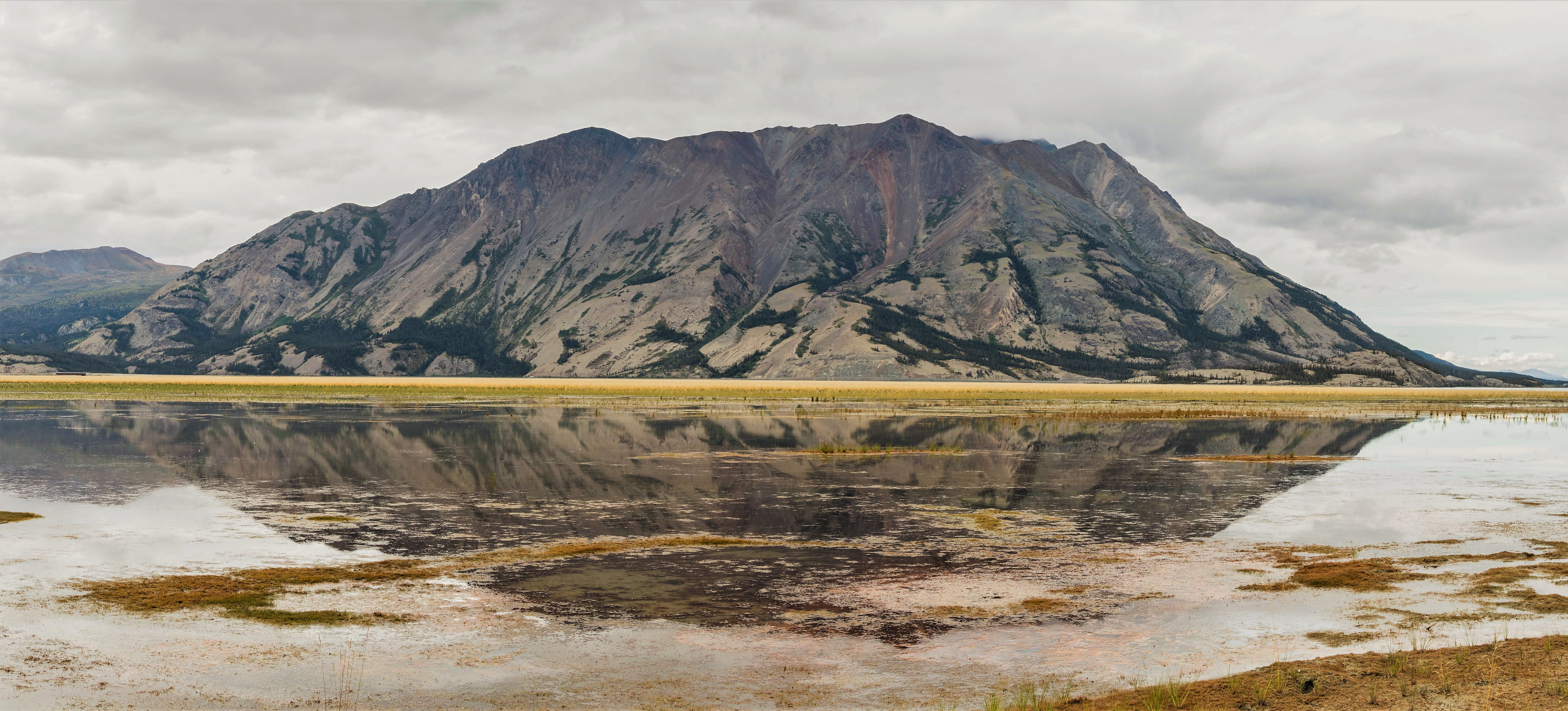

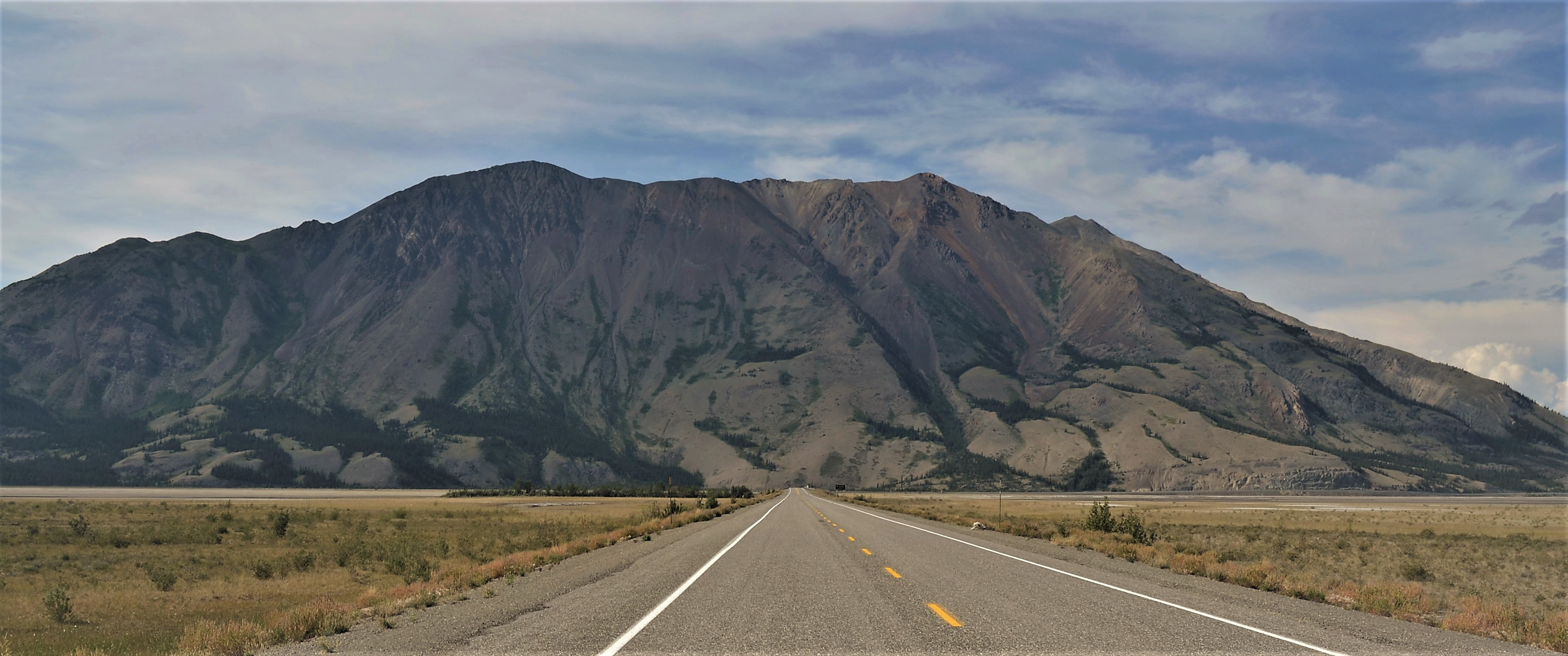

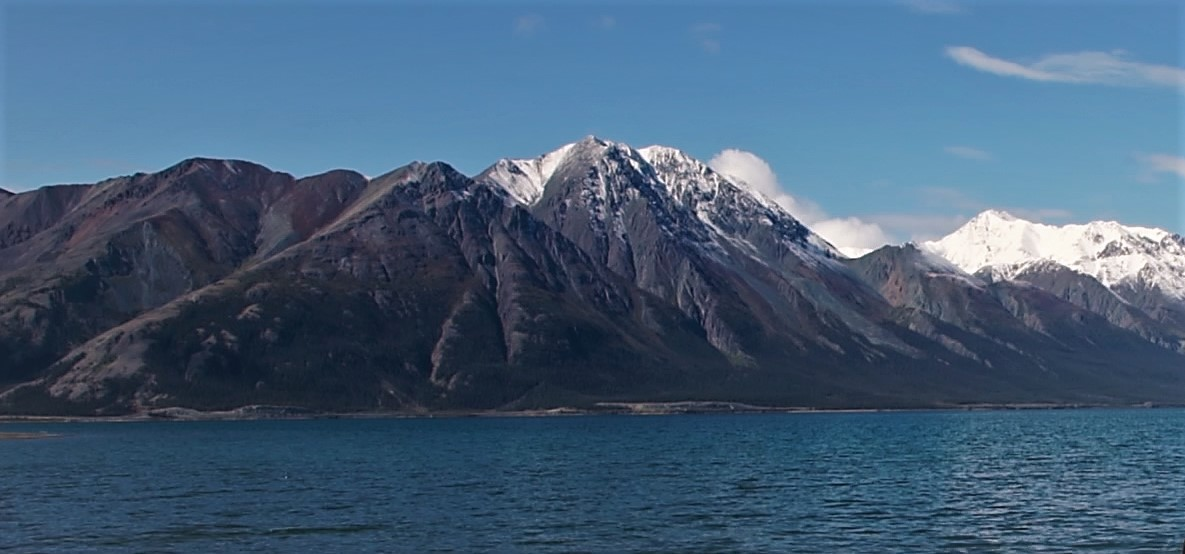
Sheep Mountain to left of parent Mount Wallace (centered)

== See also ==
- List of mountains of Canada
- Geography of Yukon
