= Kathleen Lake =

Waterbody in Canada's Kluane National Park

- Mät'àtäna Mǟn
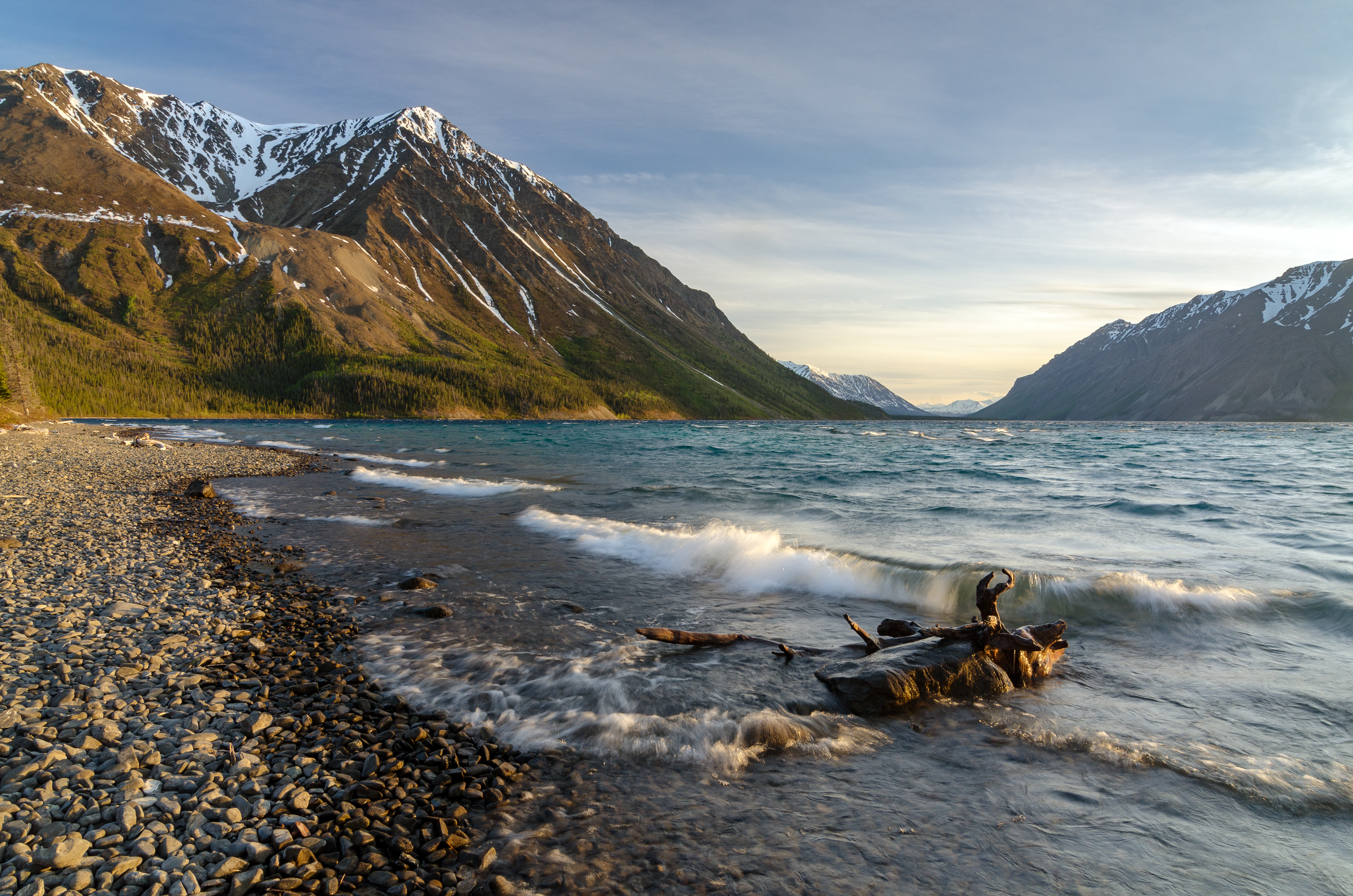
- Kathleen Lake from the eastern shore

- Location within Canada Location within Yukon
- Location: Yukon
- Coordinates: 60.5802°N 137.3019°W
- Basin countries: Canada
- Surface area: 3,376 ha (8,340 acres)
- Average depth: 52.2 m (171 ft)
- Max. depth: 111 m (364 ft)
- Surface elevation: 731 metres (2,398 ft)

Kathleen Lake (native name: Mät'àtäna Mǟn, meaning 'something frozen inside lake') is a lake in Yukon, Canada, located south of the town of Haines Junction within Kluane National Park and Reserve. Located at Haines Highway Kilometre 219.7. It hosts a day-use area, a boat launch, a campground, and several hiking trails, including the challenging 3.1 mi (5 km) ascent to King's Throne, a natural, glacially-formed amphitheater overlooking the lake.

Kathleen Lake is characterized by exceptionally clear waters and the presence of kokanee salmon, a landlocked population of sockeye living and reproducing solely in freshwater bodies. Located at an elevation of 731 m (2,398 ft) it is the largest lake wholly within the national park's boundaries, with an area of 3,376 ha (8,340 acres), a maximum depth of 111 m (364 ft) and an average depth of 52.2 m (171 ft).

Kathleen Lake was named for a girl from Berwickshire County, Scotland, left behind by William "Scotty" Hume (1868–1950), a North-West Mounted Police constable (Reg. #2259) stationed on the Dalton Trail from 1900 to 1902.

== Gallery ==
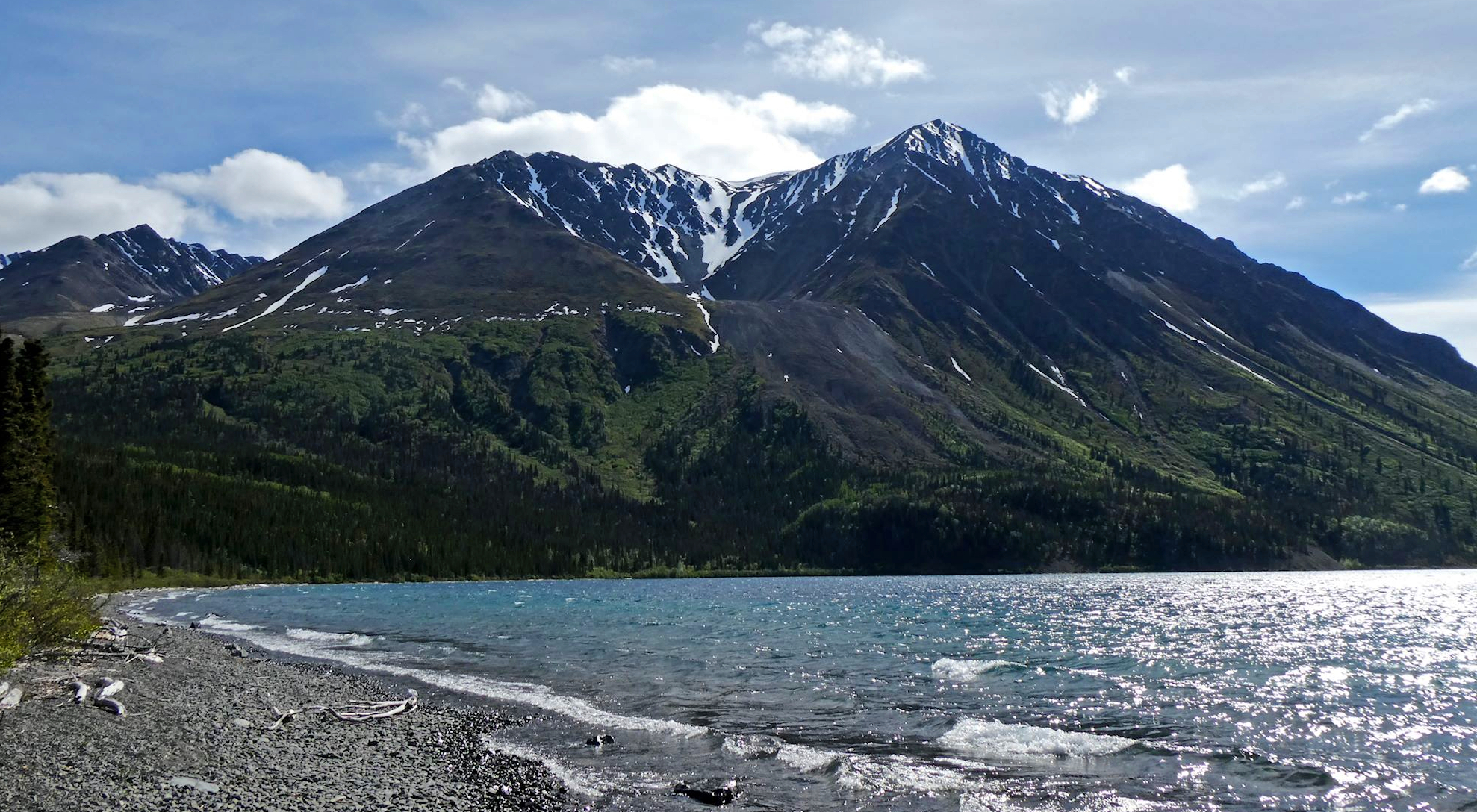
Kings Throne Peak on south shore of Kathleen Lake

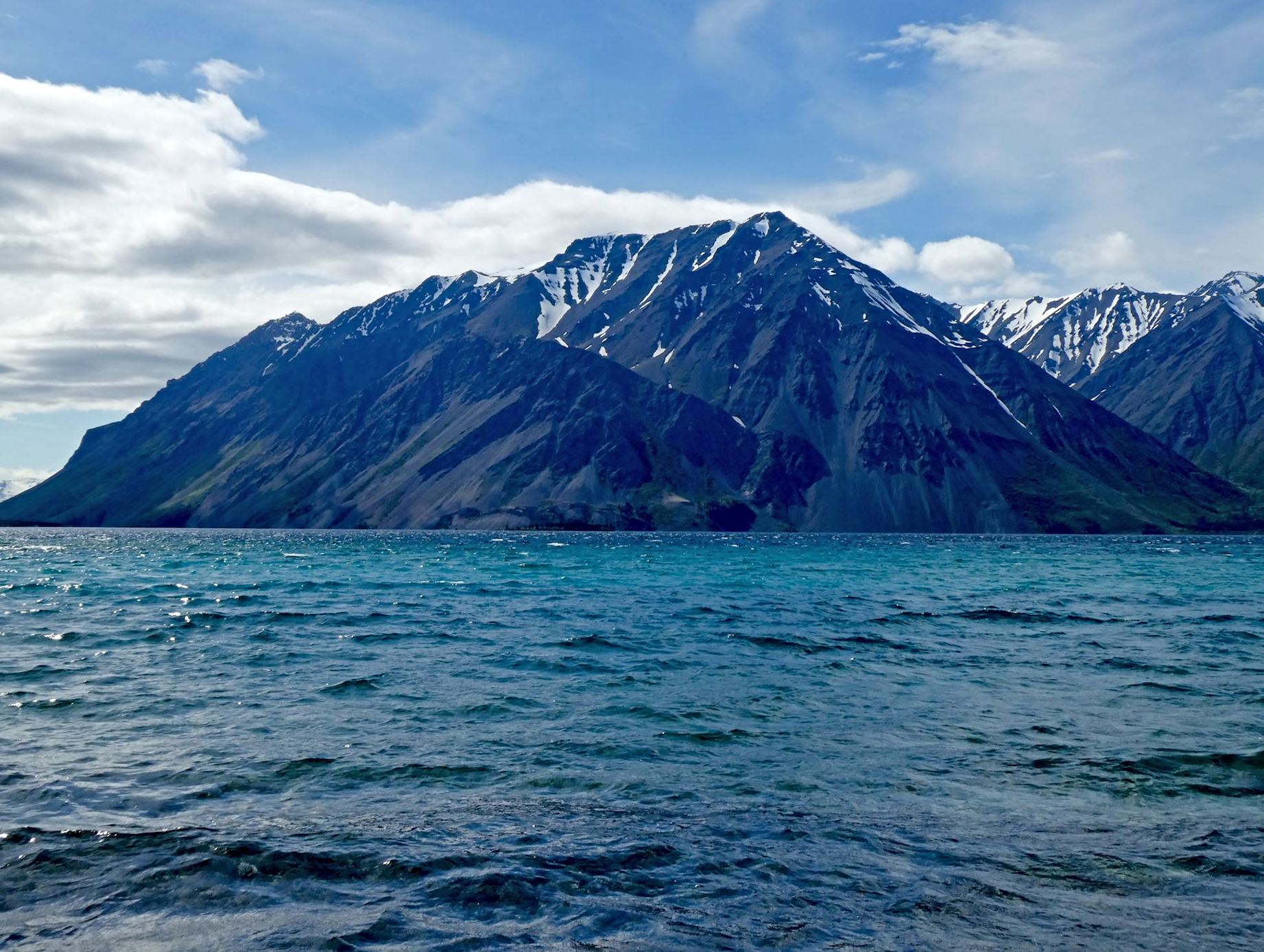
Mt. Worthington on northwest shore of Kathleen Lake
