= Kaskawulsh Mountain =

Mountain in Yukon, Canada

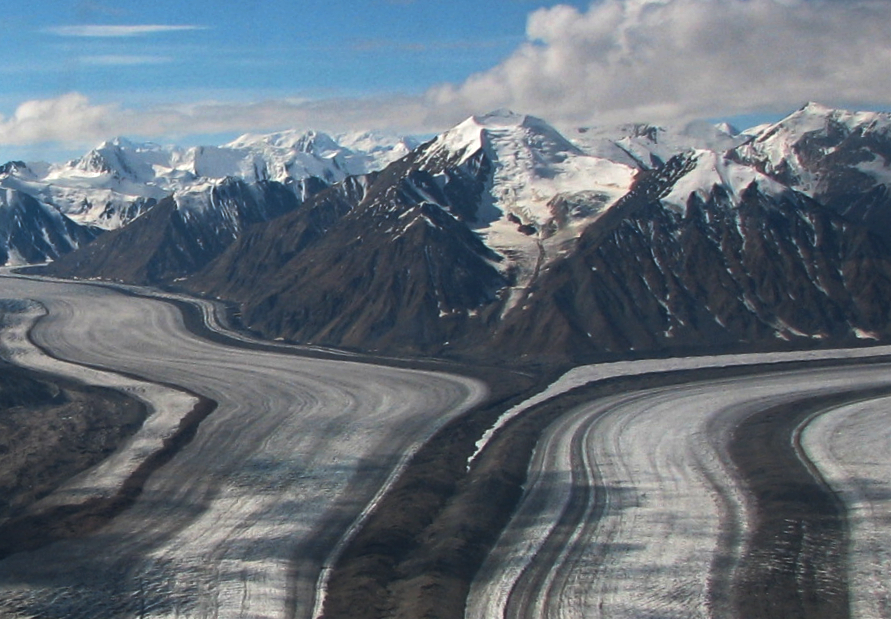
- Kaskawulsh Mountain centered between merging arms of the Kaskawulsh Glacier

Highest point
- Elevation: 2,969 m (9,741 ft)
- Prominence: 509 m (1,670 ft)
- Parent peak: GJ43 (3060 m)
- Listing: Mountains of Yukon
- Coordinates: 60°39′17″N 138°52′16″W

Geography
- Location within Yukon
- Country: Canada
- Territory: Yukon
- Parent range: Saint Elias Mountains
- Topo map: NTS 115B10 Mount Leacock

Climbing
- Easiest route: Mountaineering

Kaskawulsh Mountain is a 2,969-metre (9,741 ft) mountain summit of the Saint Elias Mountains in Kluane National Park of Yukon, Canada. Surrounded by ice on all sides, the mountain is situated in the notch where the main arm of the Kaskawulsh Glacier merges with its south arm. The Stairway Glacier lies to the west, and the Atrypa Glacier to the south. The mountain cannot be seen from any roads, but can be seen by plane, or by hiking to the summit of Observation Mountain which is located at the head of the Slims River valley. The nearest higher peak is GJ43, 3.8 km (2.4 mi) to the west.

== History ==
The native-American name kaskawulsh was given to the river north of Yakutat Bay in 1890 when it was first written by British explorer Edward J. Glave as Kaska Wurlch. Today, the Alsek River is assigned to what was known traditionally as the Kaska Wurlch. The Kaskawulsh River of today is now a tributary of the Alsek River.

The mountain's name was officially adopted in 1981 by the Geographical Names Board of Canada.

== Climate ==
Based on the Köppen climate classification, Kaskawulsh Mountain is located in a polar climate with cold, snowy winters, and mild summers.

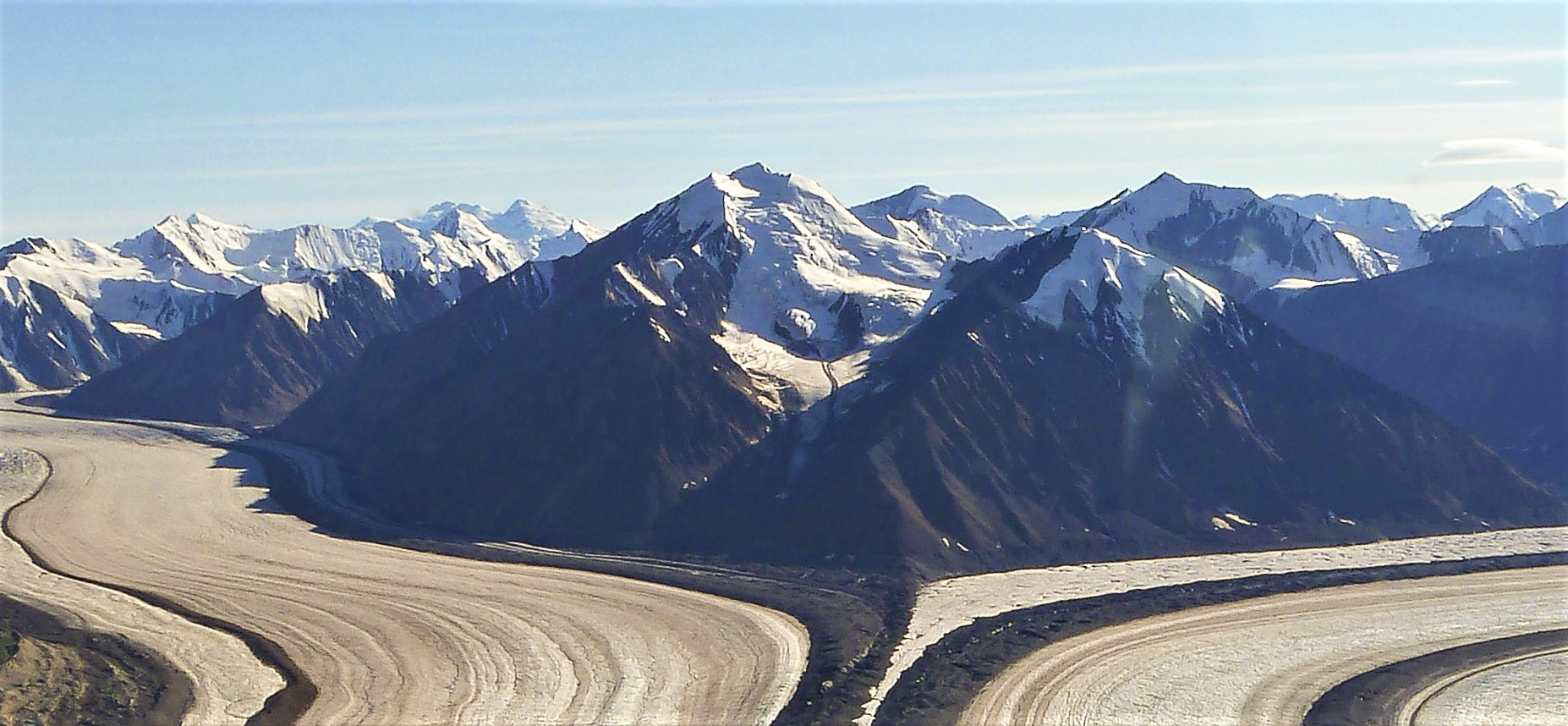
Aerial view of Kaskawulsh Mountain
