= Edgar Archibald =

Canadian agricultural scientist (1885-1968)

Edgar Spinney Archibald
- Born: May 12, 1885; Yarmouth, Nova Scotia
- Died: January 23, 1968 (aged 82); Ottawa, Ontario
- Awards: Order of Canada; Order of the British Empire
- Scientific career
- Fields: Agriculturalist

Edgar Spinney Archibald, CC CBE FRSC (May 12, 1885 – January 23, 1968) was a Canadian agricultural scientist.

He was the Director of the Dominion Experimental Farm between 1919 and 1950.

Between 1951 and 1952, he was the Senior Food and Agriculture Organization Officer for the United Nations. From 1954 to 1955 he was the Agricultural Advisor to the Ethiopian Minister of Agriculture.

In 1950 he was awarded an honorary Doctor of Laws from the University of Saskatchewan.

In 1967 he was made a Companion of the Order of Canada.

He was a Fellow of the Royal Society of Canada. He was made a Commander of the Order of the British Empire.

On 11 June 1947, the Chilliwack Progress newspaper from Chilliwack British Columbia Canada published an article and picture of Dr Archibald. The newspaper wrote that Archibald had been recognized for his outstanding achievements in experimental agriculture by the Geographic Board of Canada. The Board named Mount Archibald in the Yukon Territory after Dr Archibald. This mountain is located at Latitude 60 degrees, 45', 06", Longitude 137 degrees, 51', 23". At that time, Mount Archibald overlooked an Agriculture Experimental Station located at Mile 1059 of the Alaskan Highway.

In 1923-24 Dr Archibald was President of the Ottawa Hunt and Golf Club. During the 20s and 30s he was instrumental in starting a forestation project on the Willie Park Jr designed golf course. Close to 60K trees were planted on the Hunt Club grounds, many of which still border the fairways of the 110 year old Club. In 1938, he wrote a letter to the Club entitled " Tree Planting for the Golf Course: A Happy Experience at the Ottawa Hunt and Golf." The letter was destroyed when the original Club House burned in 1962. In 1966, two years before his death, Archibald recopied the letter and sent it to the club. Club records show that he was a Life Member of the club until he died in 1968.
