= Mount Hubbard =

Mountain on the border of Canada and Alaska

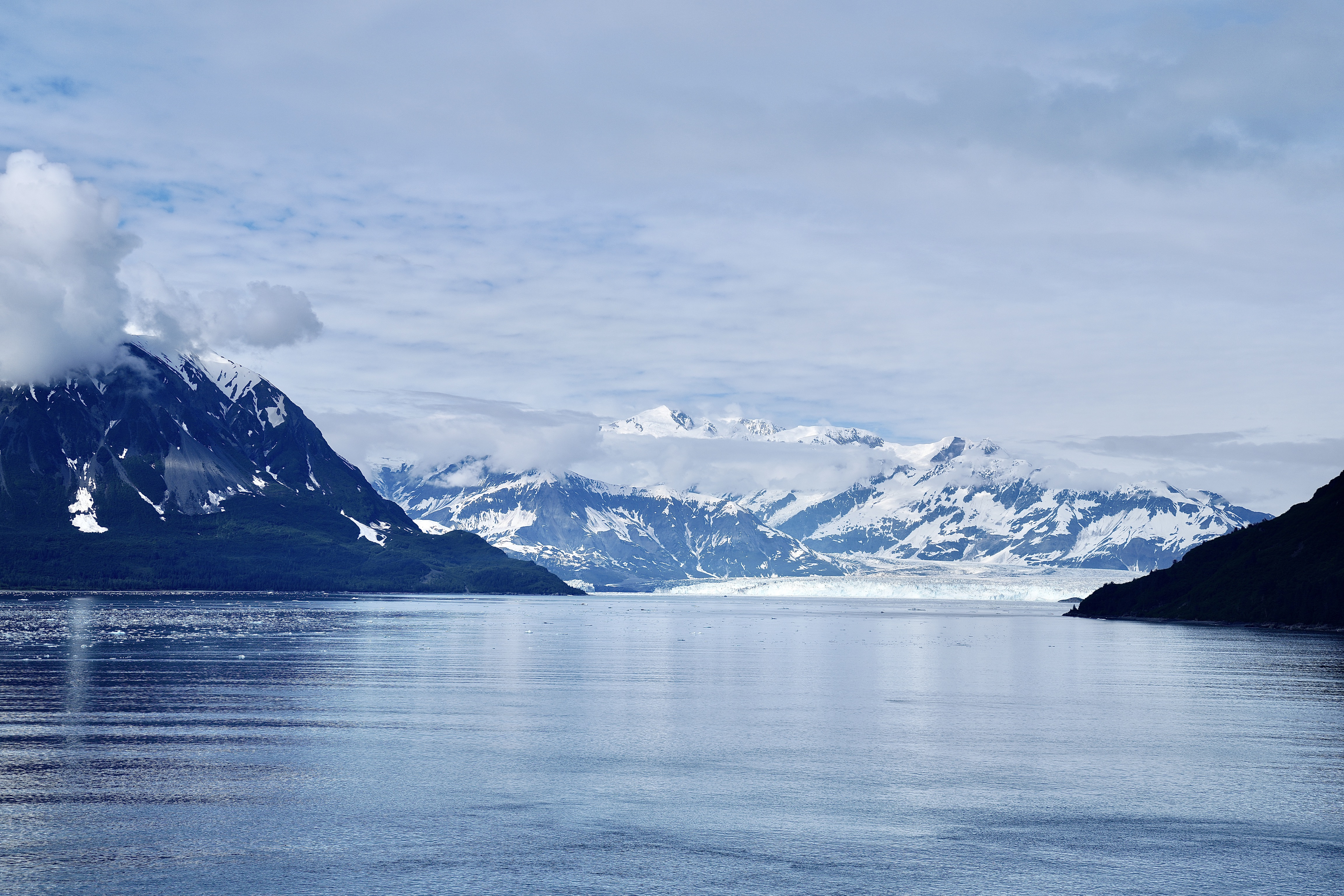
- Mt. Hubbard from Enchantment Bay with the Hubbard Glacier in the foreground.

Highest point
- Elevation: 4,557 m (14,951 ft); NAVD88
- Prominence: 2,457 m (8,061 ft)
- Isolation: 34.4 km (21.4 mi)
- Listing: North America highest peaks 19th; North America prominent peak 39th; Canada highest major peaks 10th; US highest major peaks 8th
- Coordinates: 60°19′07″N 139°04′25″W

Naming
- Etymology: Gardiner Greene Hubbard

Geography
- Location within Alaska Location within Yukon
- Location: Yukon, Canada / Yakutat City and Borough, Alaska, U.S.
- Parent range: Saint Elias Mountains
- Topo map(s): NTS 115B6 Mount Alverstone, USGS Mount Saint Elias B-3

Climbing
- First ascent: 1951 by Walter Wood et al.
- Easiest route: glacier/snow/ice climb

Mount Hubbard is one of the major mountains of the Saint Elias Range. It is located on the Alaska/Yukon border; the Canadian side is within Kluane National Park and Reserve, and the American side is part of Wrangell–St. Elias National Park. The mountain was named in 1890 by U.S. Geological Survey geologist Israel Russell after Gardiner Greene Hubbard, first president of the National Geographic Society, which had co-sponsored Russell's expedition.

Hubbard is the highest point of a large massif with three named summits; the other two are Mount Alverstone and Mount Kennedy. Alverstone and Hubbard form a corner of the Canada–United States border: the border extends roughly south from these peaks toward the Alaska panhandle, and roughly west toward Mount Saint Elias, approximately 100 km (62 mi) away. The Hubbard Glacier separates Mount Hubbard from Mount Vancouver to the west, while the Lowell Glacier lies to the east of the peak.

Mount Hubbard is the eighth-highest peak in the United States, and the twelfth-highest peak in Canada. It is also notable for its large rise above local terrain. For example, its west face rises 7,500 feet (2,300 meters) above the Alverstone Glacier in less than 2 miles (3.2 kilometers), and the peak rises 11,000 feet (3,350 m) above the Hubbard Glacier to the southwest in only 7 mi (11.3 km). Mount Hubbard is just over 20 mi (32 km) from tidewater at Disenchantment Bay. However, despite its precipitous drops to the west, the eastern side provides a non-technical (though long) route to the summit.

== See also ==
- List of mountain peaks of North America
  - List of mountain peaks of Canada
    - List of mountains of Yukon
  - List of mountain peaks of the United States
- List of Boundary Peaks of the Alaska-British Columbia/Yukon border

== Notes ==
1. Both of these use a prominence cutoff of 300 metres; different cutoffs are often used, see e.g. the List of United States fourteeners.
