= Mount Turner (Yukon) =

Mountain in Yukon, Canada

- Location within Yukon

Highest point
- Elevation: 1,267 m (4,157 ft)
- Listing: Mountains of Yukon
- Coordinates: 65°23′43″N 136°12′53″W

Geography
- Country: Canada
- Territory: Yukon
- Topo map: NTS 116H8 Mount Turner

Mount Turner is a mountain located in Yukon, Canada.
