= Haydon Peak =

Mountain in Alaska, United States

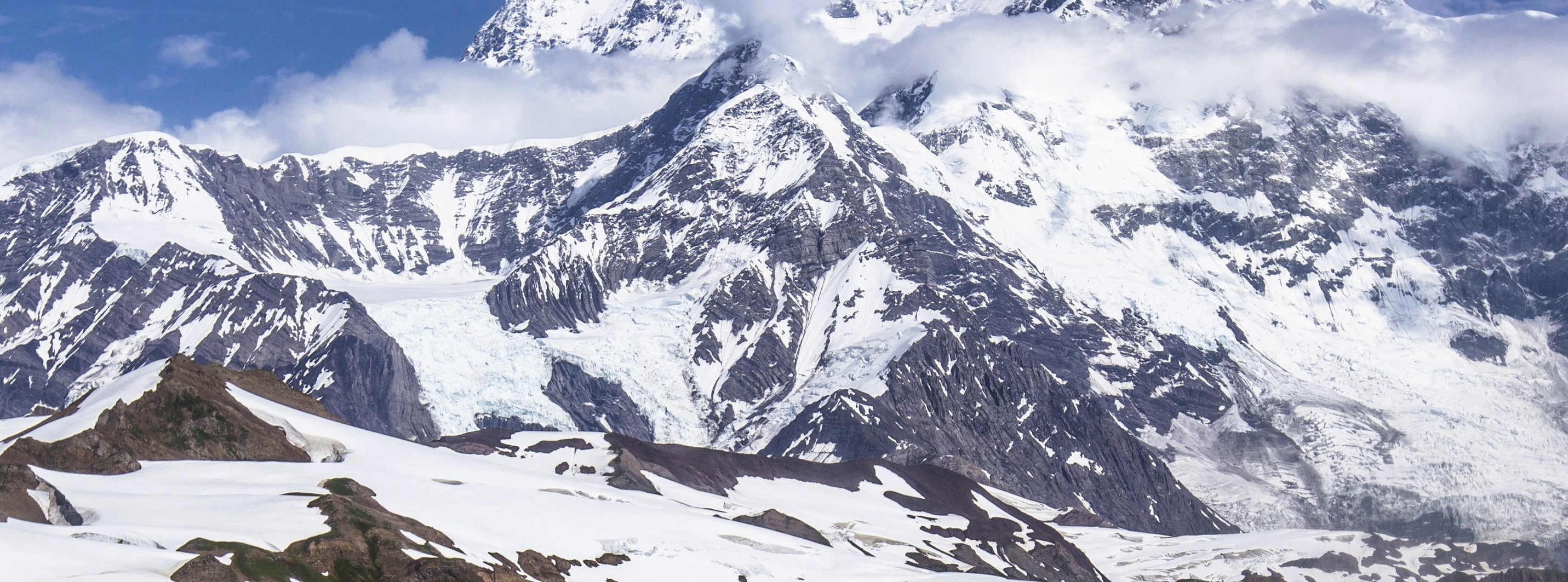
- South aspect

Highest point
- Elevation: 11,924 ft (3,634 m)
- Prominence: 1,674 ft (510 m)
- Parent peak: Mount Saint Elias (18,008 ft)
- Isolation: 3.04 mi (4.89 km)
- Listing: Highest major summits of the US; Mountain peaks of Alaska; Major summits of North America
- Coordinates: 60°15′40″N 140°59′17″W

Naming
- Etymology: Henry E. Haydon

Geography
- Location within Alaska
- Interactive map of Haydon Peak
- Country: United States
- State: Alaska
- Borough: Yakutat
- Protected area: Wrangell–St. Elias National Park
- Parent range: Saint Elias Mountains
- Topo map: USGS Mount Saint Elias B-8

Geology
- Rock age: Mesozoic
- Rock type: Schist

Climbing
- Easiest route: Expedition climbing

Haydon Peak is an 11,924-foot-elevation (3,634-meter) mountain summit in Alaska, United States.

== Description ==
Haydon Peak is part of the Saint Elias Mountains in Wrangell–St. Elias National Park and Preserve. The glaciated peak is located 3.5 miles (5.6 km) southwest of Mount Saint Elias and 66 miles (106 km) northwest of Yakutat, Alaska. The mountain is surrounded by the Libbey Glacier to the east and Tyndall Glacier to the west. Precipitation runoff and glacial meltwater from the mountain flows south to the Gulf of Alaska. Topographic relief is significant as the summit rises 8,300 feet (2,530 m) above the head of Libbey Glacier in two miles (3.2 km).

== History ==
The mountain was named "Hadon Peak" in 1888 by mountaineer Harold Ward Topham for Mr. and Mrs. Henry E. Haydon. Henry Haydon was Secretary of the District of Alaska at the time of Topham's expedition to Mount Saint Elias. Topham's failed 1888 expedition only reached an elevation of 11,460-feet on Mt. Saint Elias' south side, so a close view of Haydon Peak was possible. The mountain's toponym was officially adopted in 1917 by the U.S. Board on Geographic Names.

== Climate ==
Based on the Köppen climate classification, Haydon Peak is located in a tundra climate zone with long, cold, snowy winters, and cool summers. Weather systems coming off the Gulf of Alaska are forced upwards by the Saint Elias Mountains (orographic lift), causing heavy precipitation in the form of rainfall and snowfall. Winter temperatures can drop below −10 °F with wind chill factors below −20 °F. This climate supports several glaciers surrounding this peak. The months May through June offer the most favorable weather for viewing or climbing.

== Gallery ==
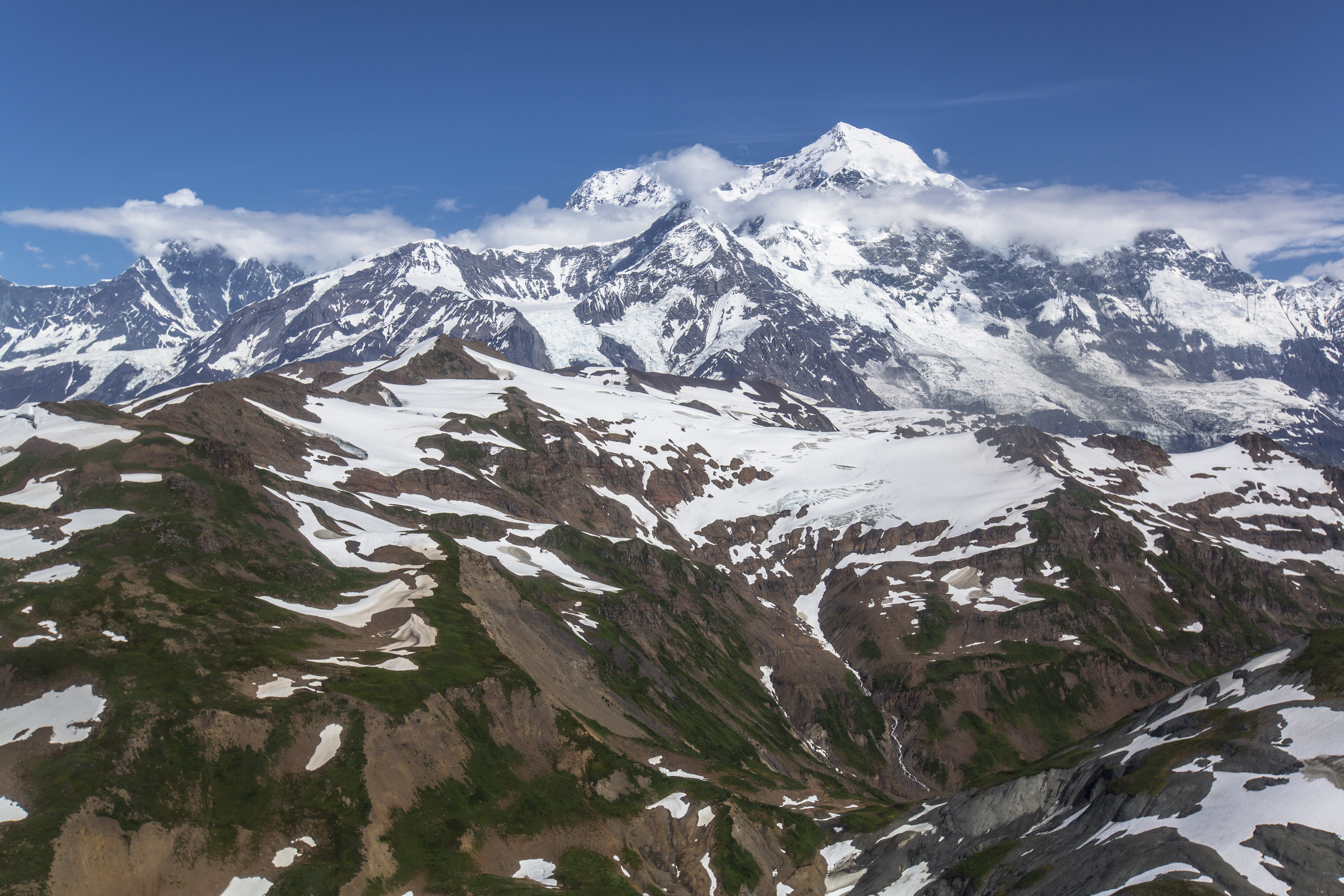
Haydon Peak in front of Mount St. Elias

== See also ==
- List of mountain peaks of Alaska
- Geography of Alaska
