= Mount Worthington (Yukon) =

Mountain in Yukon, Canada

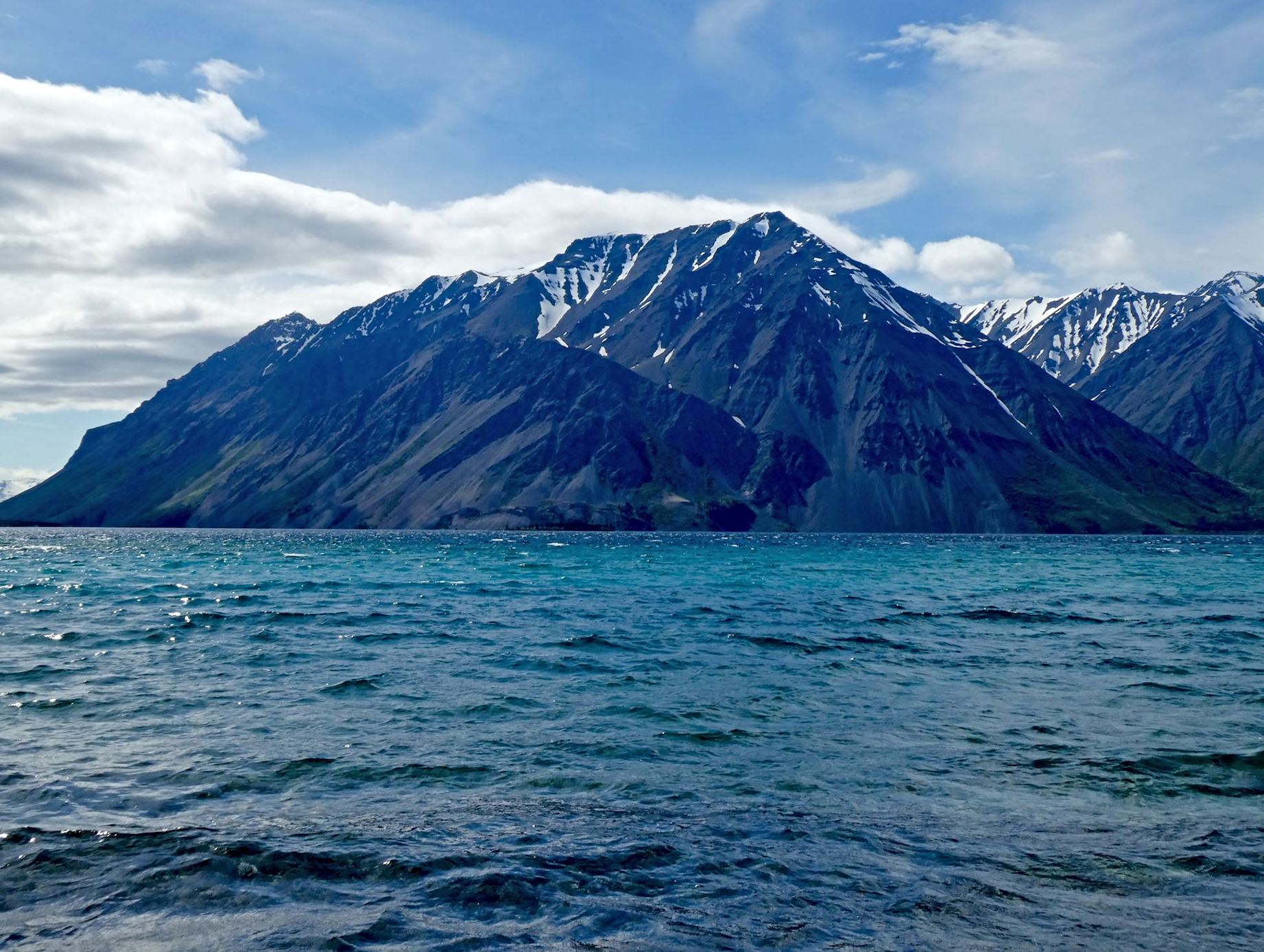
- Mount Worthington and Kathleen Lake

Highest point
- Elevation: 2,168 m (7,113 ft)
- Coordinates: 60°34′50″N 137°22′43″W

Geography
- Location within Yukon
- Location: Kluane National Park; Yukon, Canada
- Parent range: Auriol Range; Saint Elias Mountains
- Topo map: NTS 115A11 Kathleen Lakes

Mount Worthington is a 2,168-metre (7,113-foot) mountain summit in the Auriol Range of the Saint Elias Mountains, in Kluane National Park of Yukon, Canada. The mountain is situated above the shores of Kathleen Lake, 7.2 km (4 mi) northwest of Kings Throne Peak across the lake, and 19 km (12 mi) south-southeast of Haines Junction, Yukon. The mountain can be seen from the Haines Highway as it prominently rises 1,570-metre (5,150-foot) above the lake. The mountain's name was officially adopted August 12, 1980, by the Geographical Names Board of Canada. Based on the Köppen climate classification, Mount Worthington is located in a subarctic climate with long, cold, snowy winters, and mild summers.

== Gallery ==
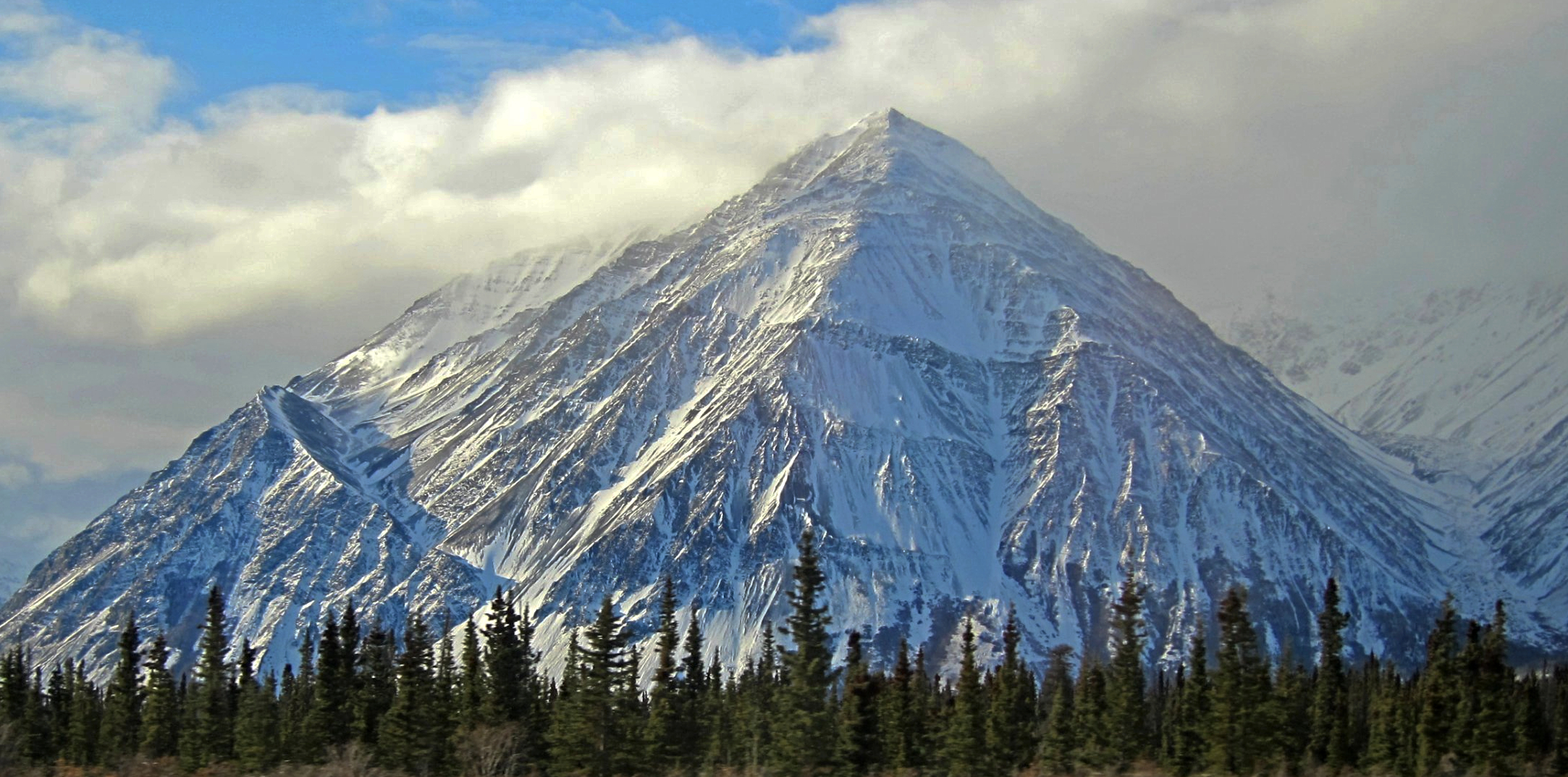
Mount Worthington

== See also ==
- List of mountains of Canada
- Geography of Yukon
