= Kings Throne Peak =

Mountain in Yukon, Canada

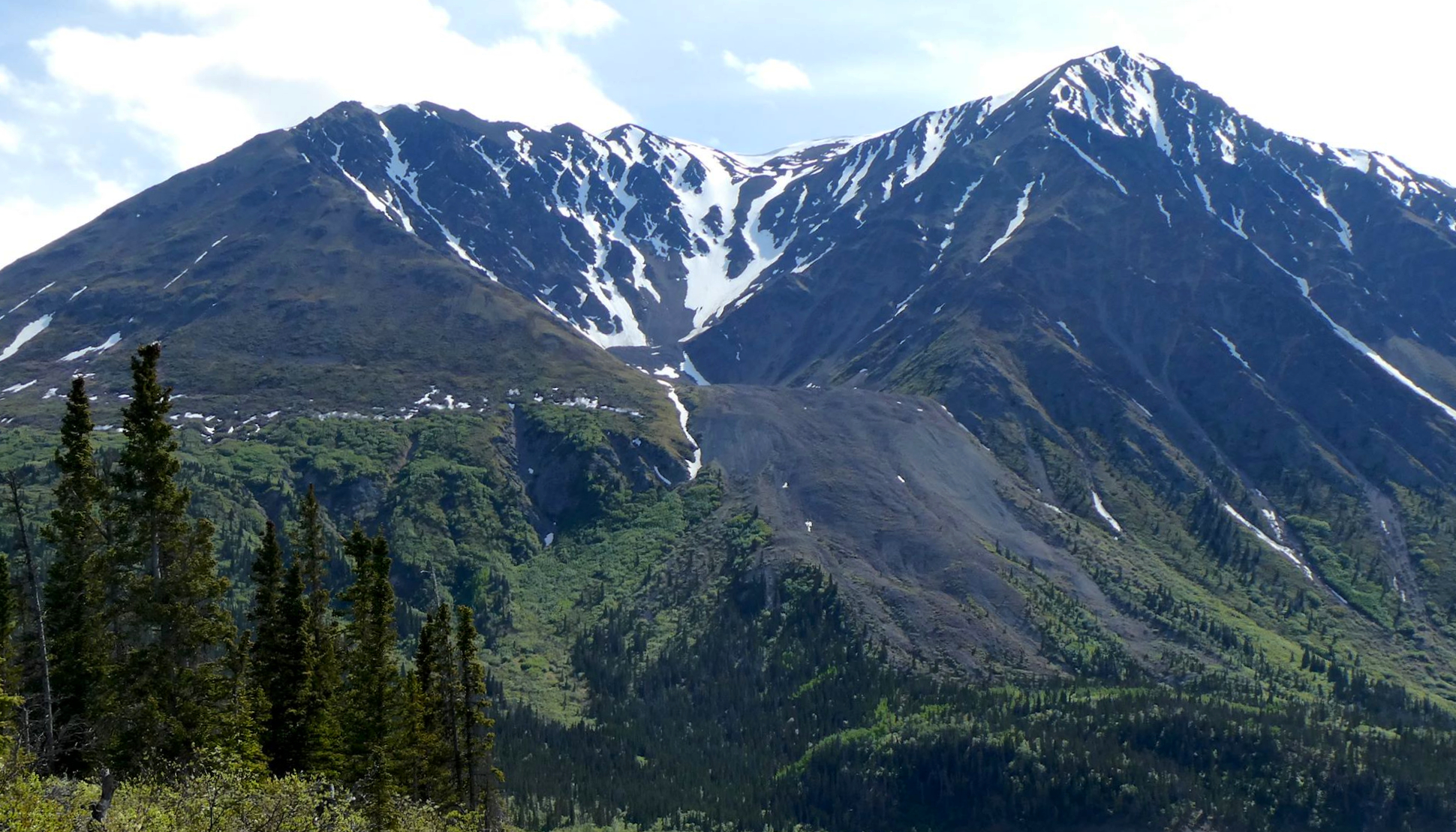
- Kings Throne Peak, northeast aspect

Highest point
- Elevation: 1,990 m (6,530 ft)
- Prominence: 90 m (300 ft)
- Coordinates: 60°32′48″N 137°15′33″W

Geography
- Location within Yukon
- Location: Kluane National Park; Yukon, Canada
- Parent range: Dalton Range; Saint Elias Mountains
- Topo map: NTS 115A11 Kathleen Lakes

Climbing
- Easiest route: Very steep trail

Kings Throne Peak is a 1,990-metre (6,530-foot) mountain summit in the Dalton Range of the Saint Elias Mountains, in Kluane National Park of Yukon, Canada. The mountain is situated above the south shore of Kathleen Lake, 7.2 km (4 mi) southeast of Mount Worthington across the lake, and 27 km (17 mi) south-southeast of Haines Junction, Yukon. The mountain can be seen from the Haines Highway as it prominently rises 1,250-metre (4,100-foot) above the lake. The mountain's descriptive name comes from how it is shaped by a cirque on the north aspect. A rock glacier descends from the cirque to the lake. A steep five kilometre trail provides access to the amphitheatre, and an additional three kilometres on a beaten path reaches the summit via the east ridge. Based on the Köppen climate classification, Kings Throne Peak is located in a subarctic climate zone with long, cold, snowy winters, and mild summers.

== See also ==
- List of mountains of Canada
- Geography of Yukon
