= Mount Cairnes =

Mountain in Yukon, Canada

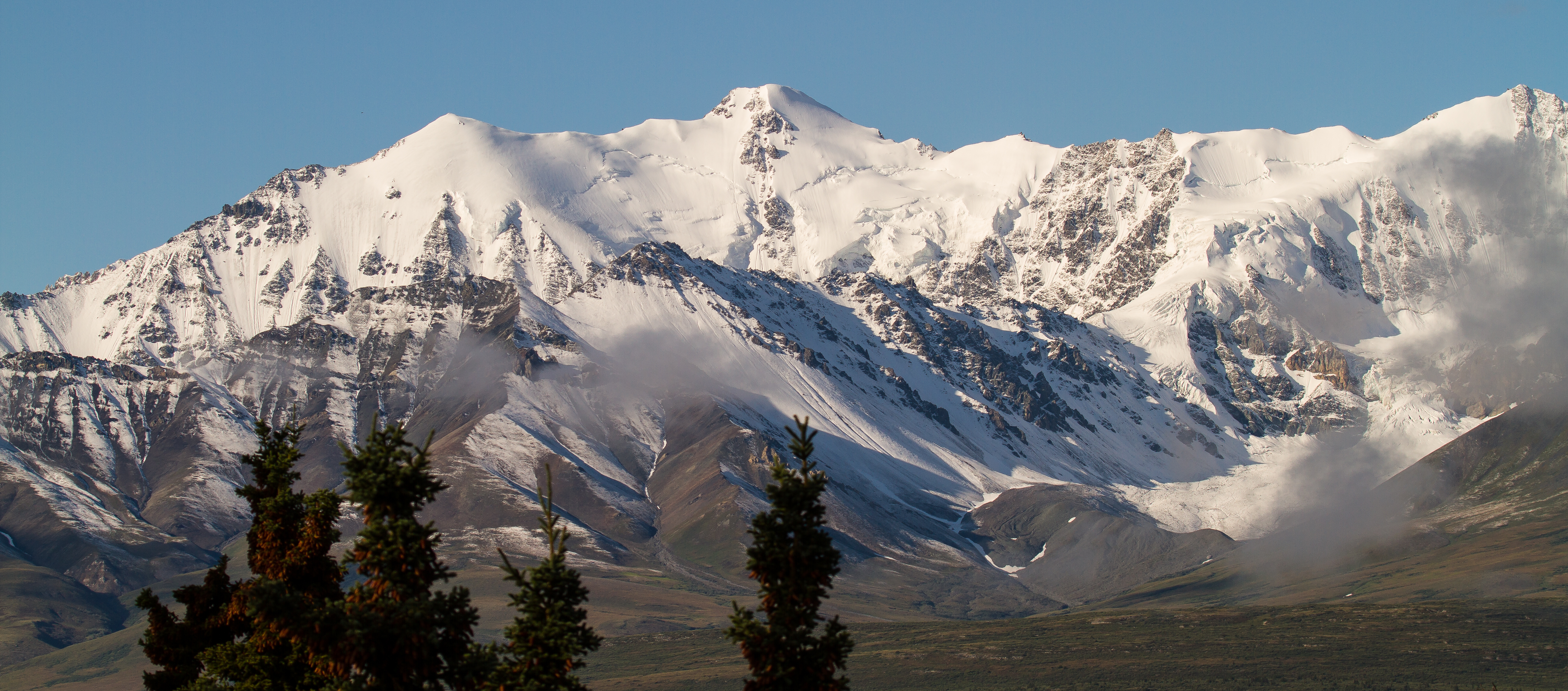
- Mount Cairnes, north aspect

Highest point
- Elevation: 2,810 m (9,220 ft)
- Prominence: 1,990 m (6,530 ft)
- Parent peak: Mount Maxwell (3020 m)
- Listing: Ultras of Canada 41st; Canada highest major peaks 86th
- Coordinates: 60°52′06″N 138°16′37″W

Geography
- Location within Yukon
- Location: Kluane National Park and Reserve; Yukon, Canada
- Parent range: Saint Elias Mountains
- Topo map: NTS 115B16 Jarvis River

Mount Cairnes is a 2,810-metre (9,220-foot) mountain summit in the Saint Elias Mountains on the boundary line of Kluane National Park in Yukon, Canada. The mountain is situated 44 km (27 mi) west of Haines Junction, 18 km (11 mi) southeast of Kluane Lake, and can be seen from the Alaska Highway midway between the two. Its nearest higher peak is Mount Maxwell, 27.7 km (17.2 mi) to the southwest. The mountain's name was officially adopted February 3, 1981, by the Geographical Names Board of Canada. Clive Elmore Cairnes (1892–1954) was active with the Geological Survey of Canada as well as the Geographic Board of Canada until his retirement in 1953. He was related to noted geologist DeLorme Donaldson Cairnes (1879–1917), for whom this mountain is named.

== Climate ==
Based on the Köppen climate classification, Mount Cairnes is located in a subarctic climate with long, cold, snowy winters, and mild summers. Temperatures can drop below −20 °C with wind chill factors below −30 °C. Precipitation runoff from the peak and meltwater from its pocket glaciers drains into tributaries of the Kaskawulsh River.

== See also ==
- List of mountains of Yukon
- Geography of Yukon
