= Mount Newton (Yukon) =

Mountain in Yukon, Canada

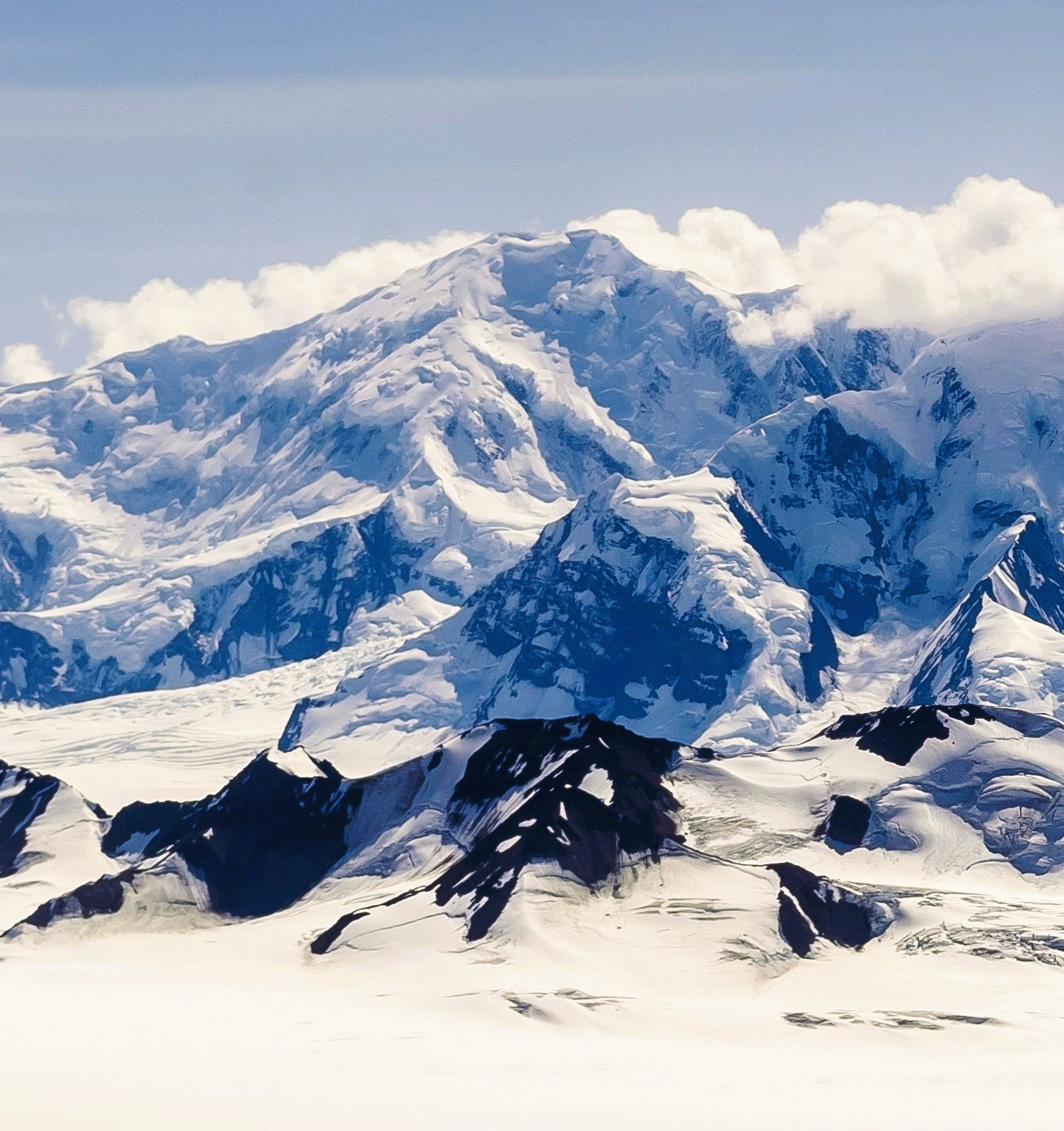
- Northwest aspect

Highest point
- Elevation: 4,200 m (13,780 ft)
- Prominence: 400 m (1,312 ft)
- Parent peak: Mount Saint Elias (5,489 m)
- Isolation: 4.5 km (2.8 mi)
- Coordinates: 60°19′21″N 140°52′28″W

Naming
- Etymology: Henry Newton

Geography
- Location within Yukon
- Interactive map of Mount Newton
- Country: Canada
- Territory: Yukon
- Protected area: Kluane National Park
- Parent range: Saint Elias Mountains
- Topo map: NTS 115C7 Newton Glacier

Climbing
- First ascent: 1964
- Easiest route: Expedition climbing

Mount Newton is a 4,200-metre (13,780-foot) mountain summit in Yukon, Canada.

== Description ==
Mount Newton is part of the Saint Elias Mountains in Kluane National Park where it ranks as the 22nd-highest summit in Canada. The remote mountain is highly glaciated and surrounded by the Seward and Newton glaciers. The nearest higher neighbor is Mount Saint Elias, 4 km (2.5 mi) to the southwest, and Mount Logan is 37 km (23 mi) to the northeast. Topographic relief is significant as the summit rises approximately 1,700 metres (5,577 ft) above the head of the Newton Glacier in 3 km (1.9 mi).

== Etymology ==
The mountain's toponym was officially adopted in 1917 by the Geographical Names Board of Canada to honor US geologist Henry Newton (1845–1877), grandson of Sir Isaac Newton and author of a report on the geology of the Black Hills that confirmed gold there. The mountain was so named by Israel Russell in 1890 when this land was claimed by the US. Russell Col is the low point between Mt. Newton and Mt. Saint Elias.

== Climate ==
Based on the Köppen climate classification, Mount Newton is located in a tundra climate zone with long, cold, snowy winters, and cool summers. Weather systems coming off the Gulf of Alaska are forced upwards by the Saint Elias Mountains (orographic lift), causing heavy precipitation in the form of rainfall and snowfall. Winter temperatures can drop below -10 °C with wind chill factors below −30 °C. This climate supports immense glaciers surrounding this mountain. The months May through June offer the most favorable weather for climbing or viewing.

== Gallery ==
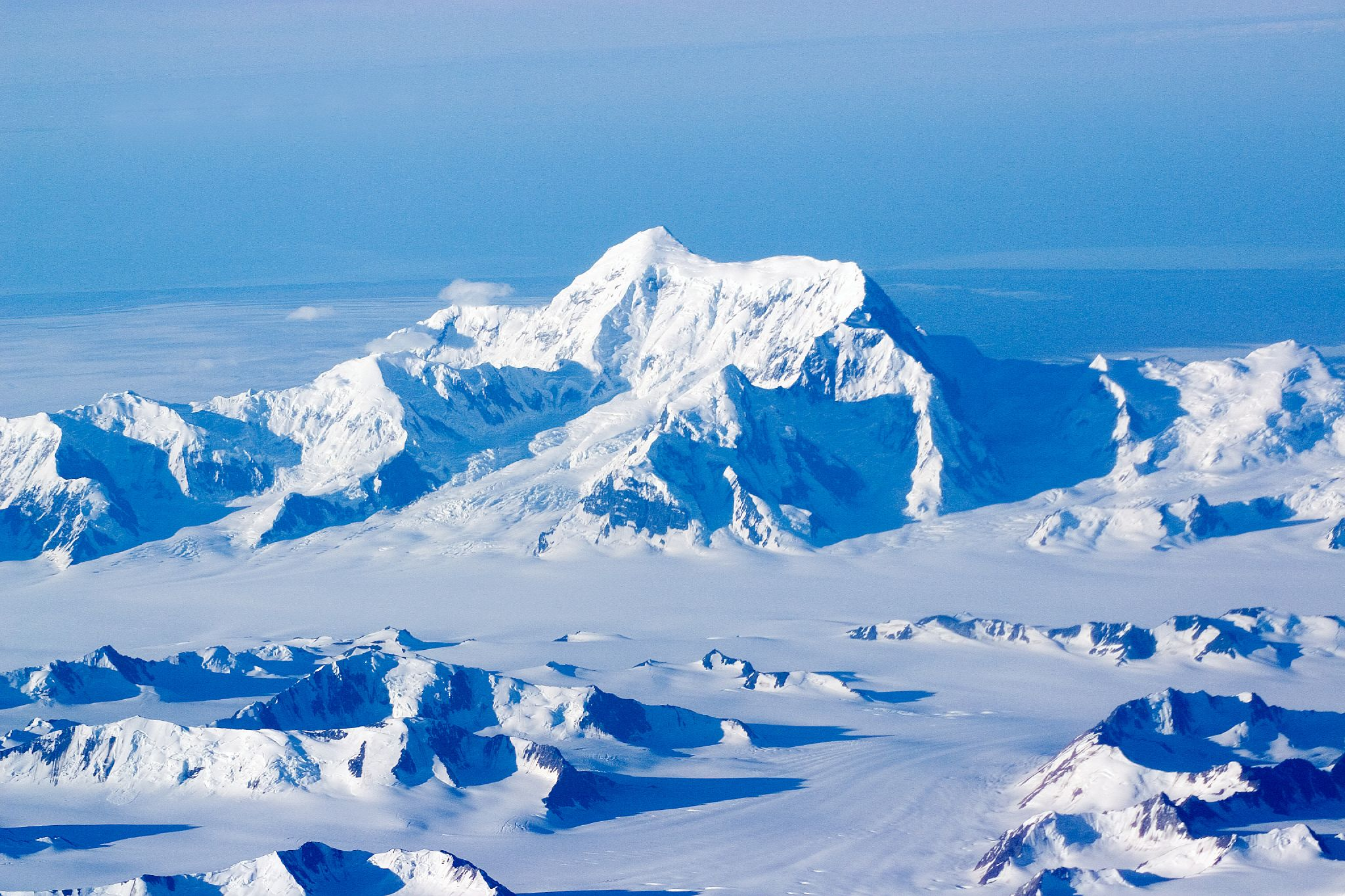
Mount Saint Elias (centered) with Mount Newton left of centre

== See also ==
- List of the highest major summits of Canada
- Geography of Yukon
