= Mount Maxwell =

Mountain summit in Yukon, Canada

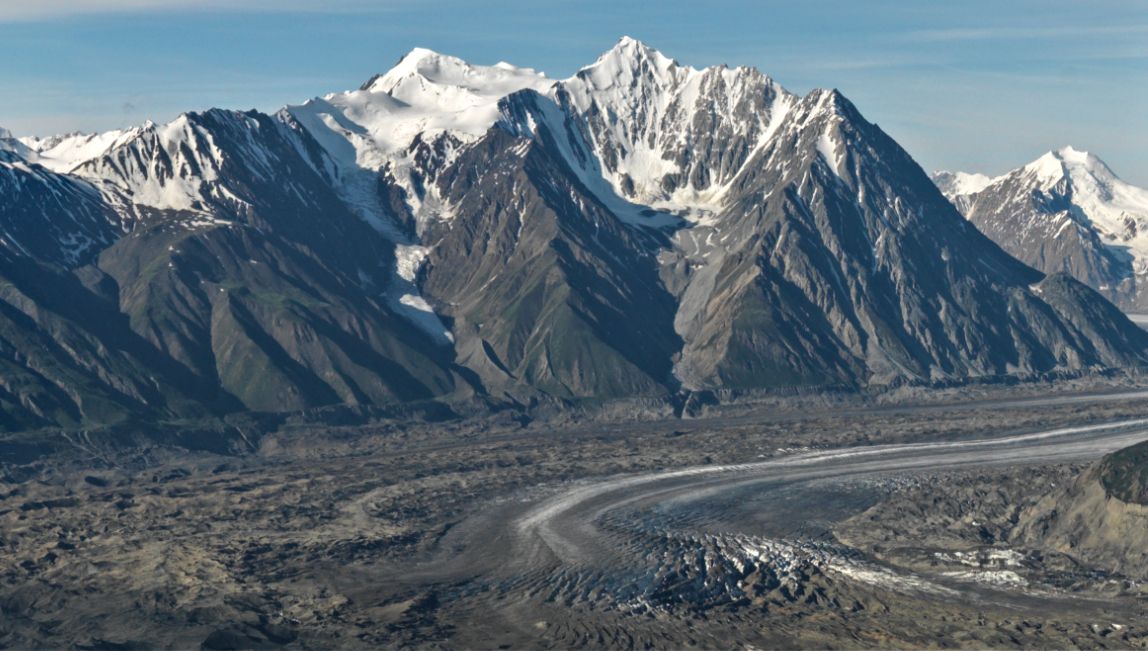
- Mount Maxwell and Kaskawulsh Glacier

Highest point
- Elevation: 3,020 m (9,910 ft)
- Prominence: 509 m (1,670 ft)
- Parent peak: Mount Leacock (3100 m)
- Coordinates: 60°42′58″N 138°40′55″W

Geography
- Location within Yukon
- Interactive map of Mount Maxwell
- Location: Yukon, Canada
- Parent range: Saint Elias Mountains
- Topo map: NTS 115B10 Mount Leacock

Climbing
- Easiest route: Mountaineering

Mount Maxwell is a 3,020-metre (9,910-foot) mountain summit of the Saint Elias Mountains in Kluane National Park of Yukon, Canada. The mountain is situated at the toe of the Kaskawulsh Glacier. The mountain cannot be seen from any roads, but can be seen from the Slims River valley. The nearest higher peak is Mount Leacock, 9.2 km (5.7 mi) to the south. The "Mt Maxwell" designation is misplaced five kilometres to the northeast of the actual summit on the topographic map. The mountain was named by John Oliver Wheeler (1924- 2015), a Canadian geologist with the Geological Survey of Canada who climbed Maxwell in 1954. The Maxwell name was approved in 1960, and was made official in 1981 by the Geographical Names Board of Canada. However, it remains a mystery who Maxwell was. Based on the Köppen climate classification, Mount Maxwell is located in a subarctic climate with long, cold, snowy winters, and mild summers.

== Gallery ==
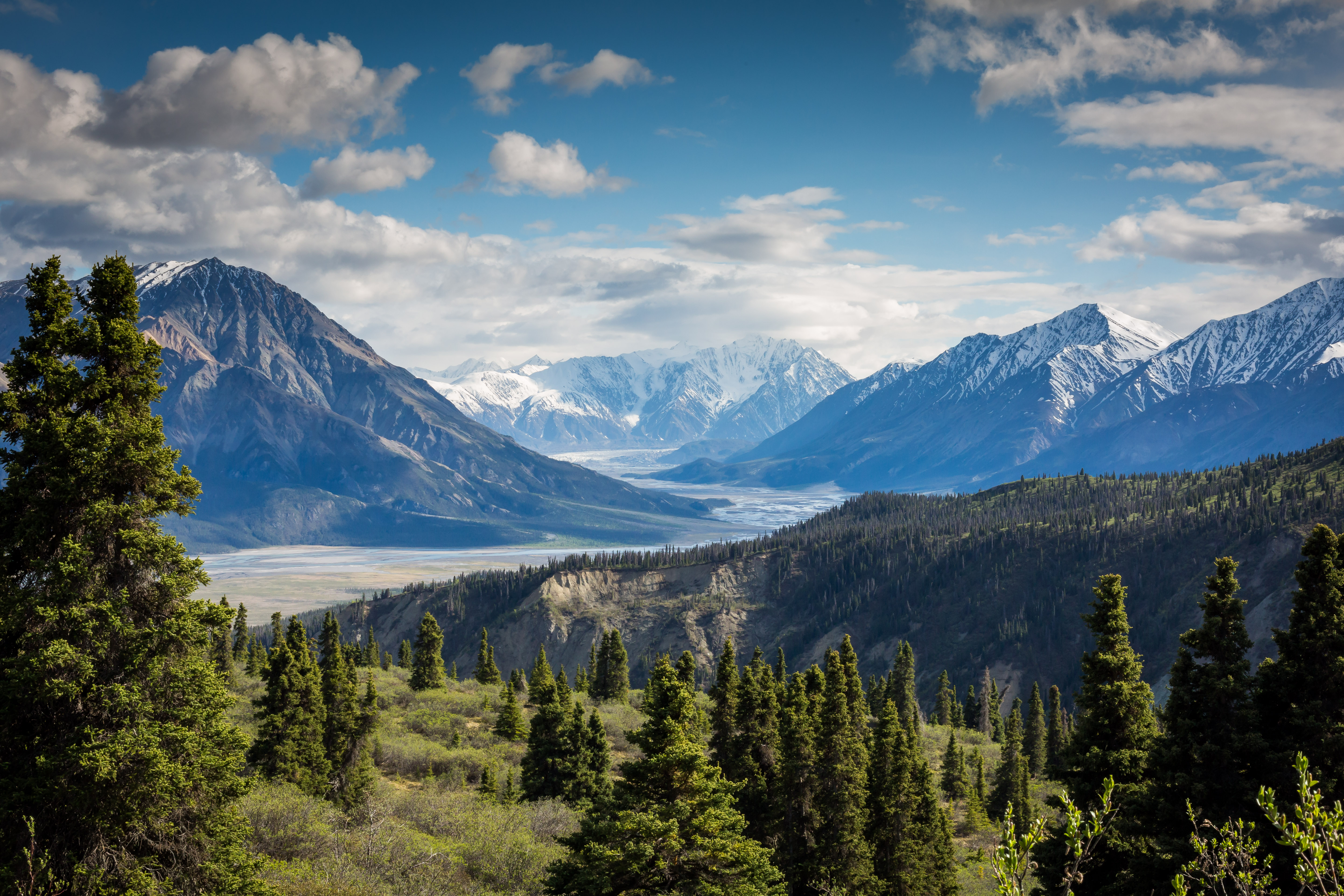
Mount Maxwell centered in the distance

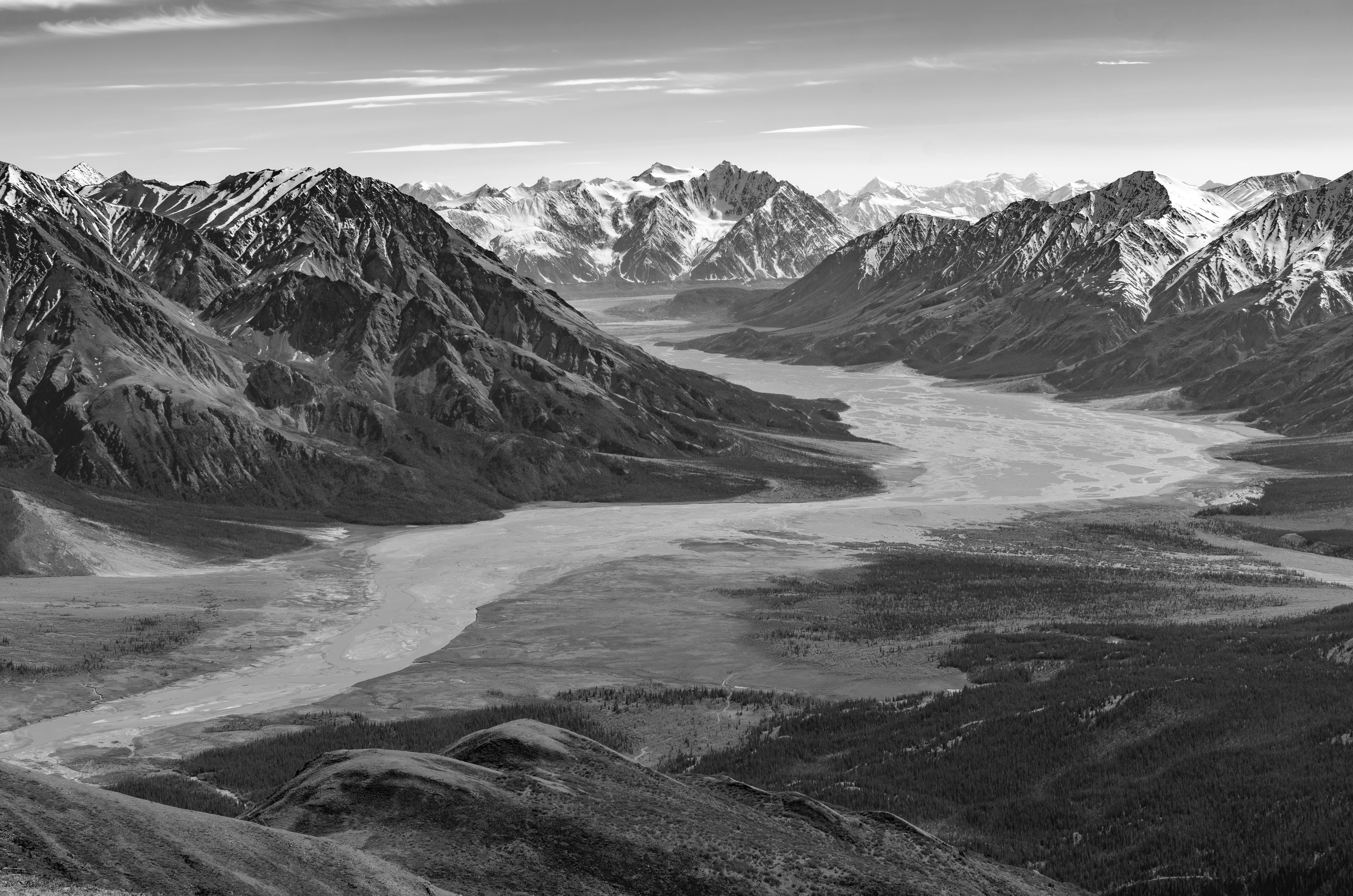
Mount Maxwell centered on horizon

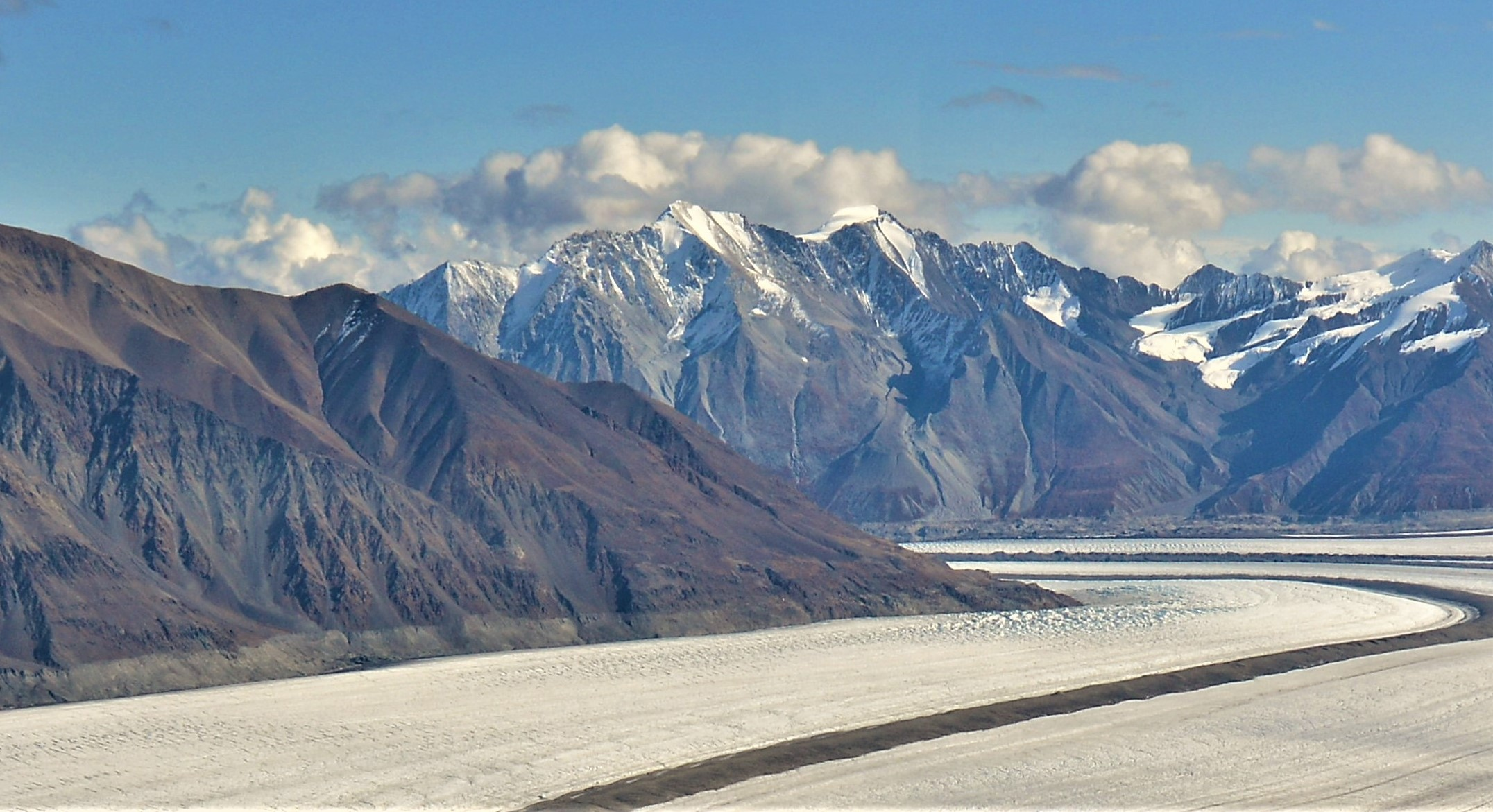
West aspect

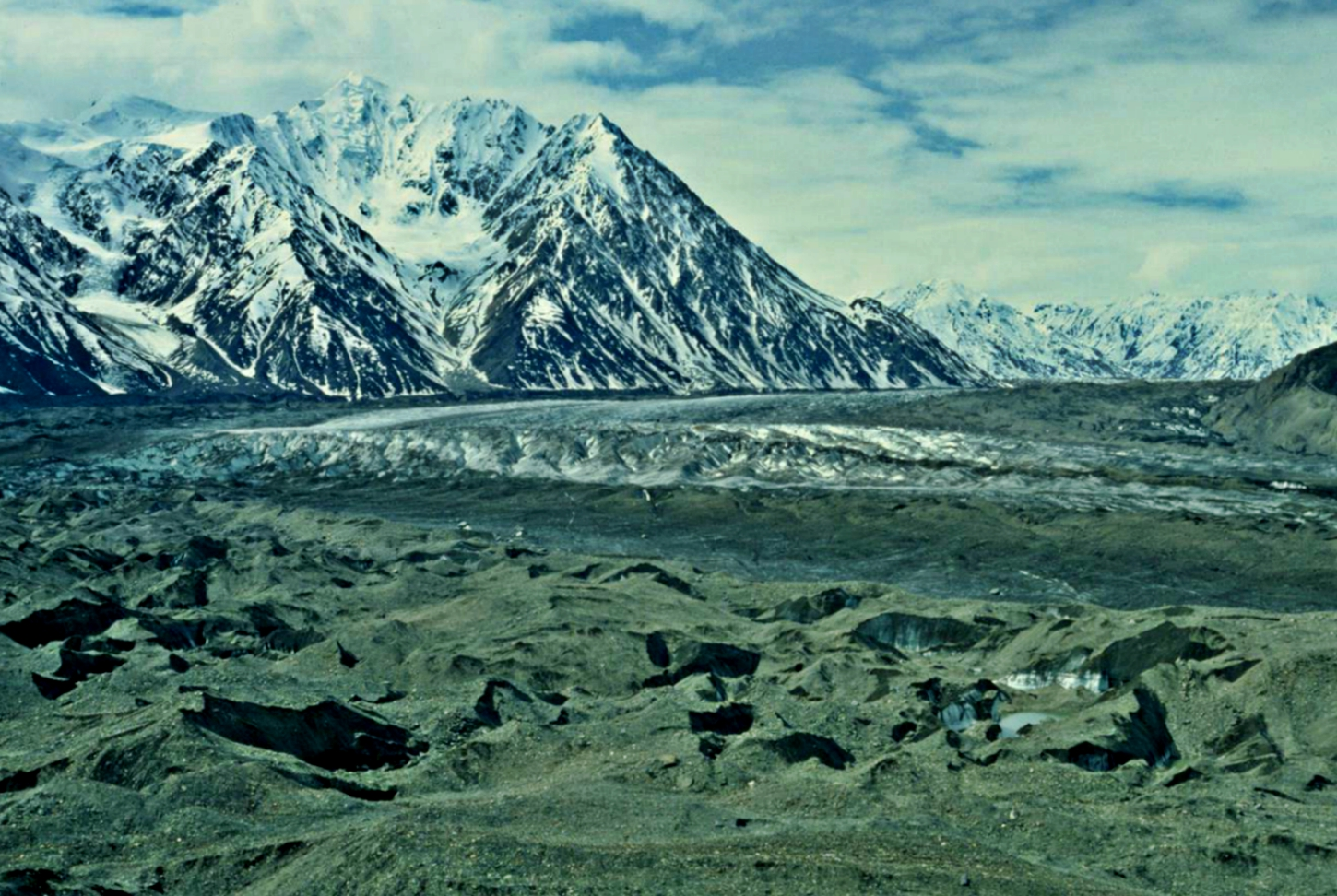
Mount Maxwell with Kaskawulsh Glacier

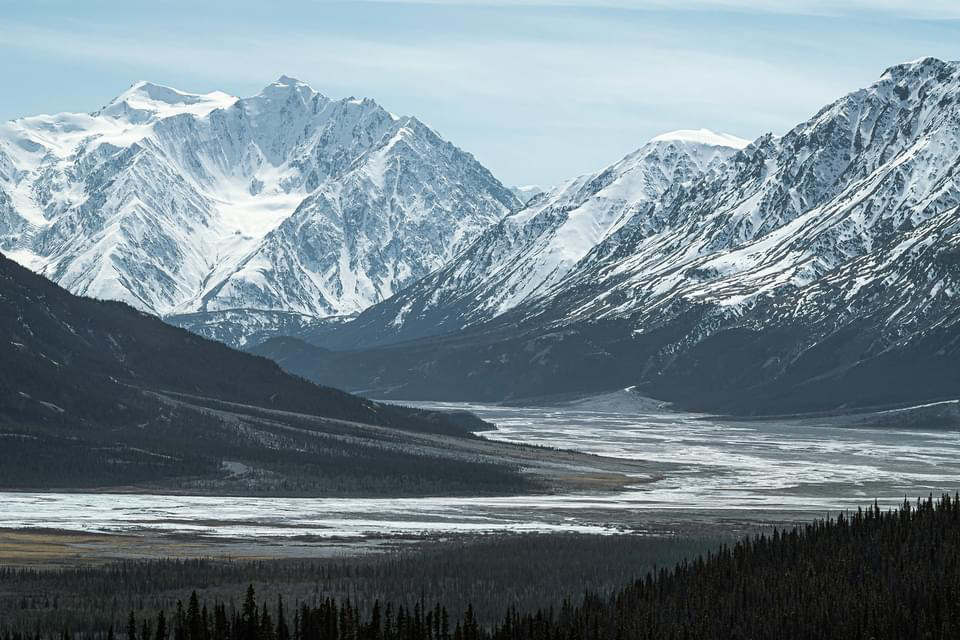
Mount Maxwell upper left

== See also ==
- List of mountains of Canada
- Geography of Yukon
