= Mount Kennedy =

Peak in Yukon, Canada

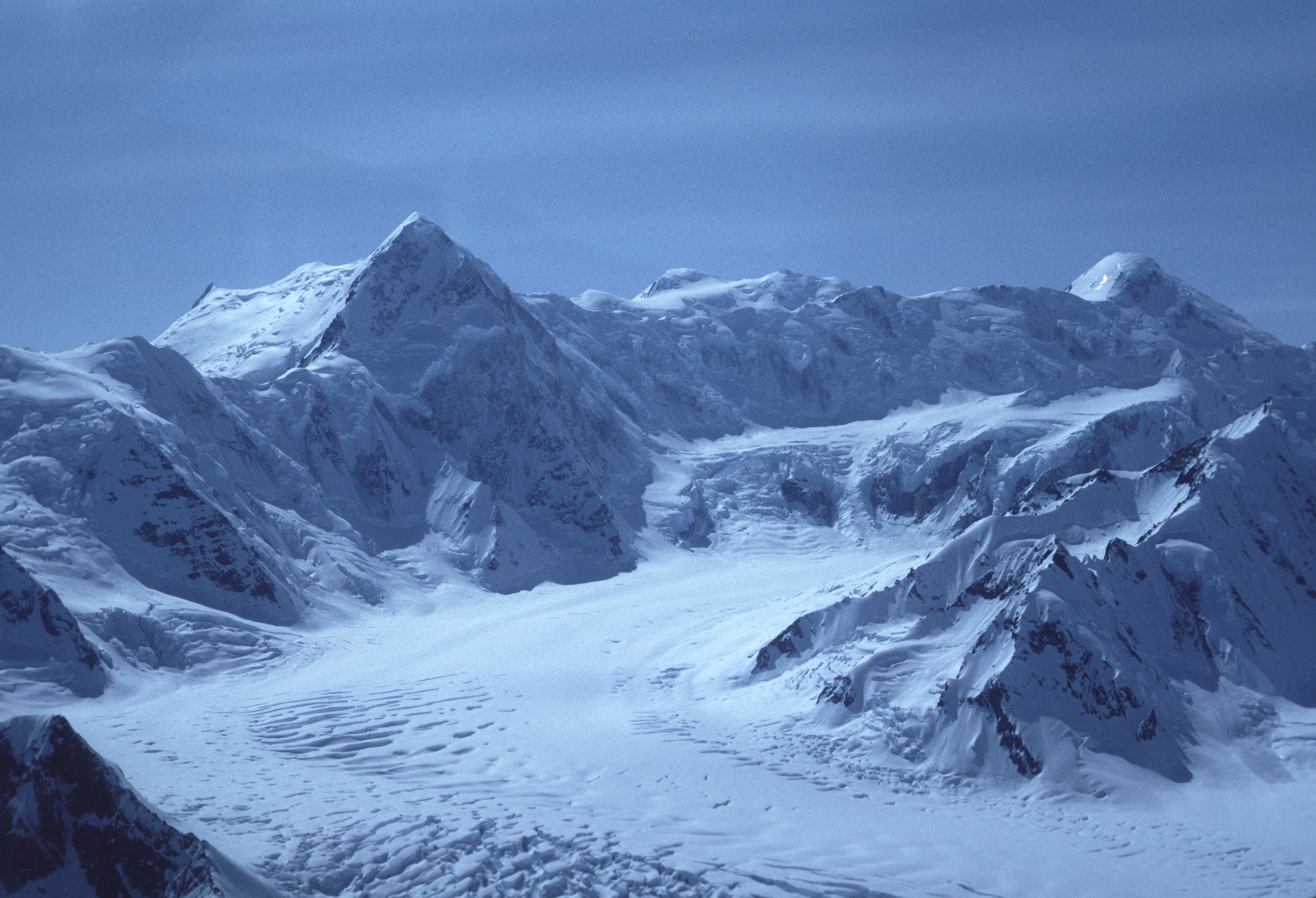
- Mount Kennedy (left) from the air to the north, with the summits of Mts. Hubbard and Alverstone showing.

Highest point
- Elevation: 4,250–4,300 m (13,940–14,110 ft)
- Prominence: 390 m (1,280 ft)
- Listing: Mountains of Yukon
- Coordinates: 60°20′28.2″N 138°57′58.8″W

Geography
- Location within Yukon
- Interactive map of Mount Kennedy
- Country: Canada
- Territory: Yukon
- Parent range: Saint Elias Mountains
- Topo map: NTS 115B7 Mount Kennedy

Climbing
- First ascent: 1965
- Easiest route: glacier/snow/ice climb

Mount Kennedy is a peak in the Saint Elias Mountains within Kluane National Park, in Yukon, Canada. Its 4250-m to 4300-m (14000-foot) summit lies within 10 km of the Alaska Panhandle. Dusty Glacier lies against it to the north.

The Canadian government named the peak in honour of U.S. President John F. Kennedy nearly a year following his assassination. In announcing the decision to the House of Commons on November 20, 1964, prime minister Lester B. Pearson said "I believe it is appropriate that Canada's memorial to him should be a mountain. A mountain is solid and enduring. Mount Kennedy is a graceful, towering, unencumbered peak ... a symbol of aspiration and upward reach." It was at the time, the highest peak in North America that had not yet been climbed. American mountaineer Bradford Washburn who had aided the Canadian government in selecting the peak said that "the Canadians sought a mountain that had not previously been named, that towered lofty and magnificent, and that lay as close as possible to the international boundary, where it would endure as a symbol of the unique friendship that exists between our two great nations."

== First ascent ==
Its first ascent was in 1965 by Robert F. Kennedy, with a party of experienced mountaineers sponsored by the National Geographic Society and led by Jim Whittaker. Upon reaching the peak of the summit, Kennedy left some of his brother's PT-boat tie clips, a copy of his brother's 1961 inaugural address, and a John F. Kennedy medallion. This route from the Cathedral Glacier to the south is now considered a routine climb for experienced glacier travelers, having little technical difficulties other than navigation of extensive crevasse fields and avoidance of avalanches. Since then, other routes have been completed, including the highly technical North Buttress, first climbed in 1968 using siege tactics (placing fixed ropes and returning to a base camp), and finally in 2001 in purely alpine style (continuous ascent from bottom to summit with no fixed ropes).

Climbers in the first ascent party included:

- Jim Whittaker (1929–2026)
- Robert F. Kennedy (1925–1968)
- George R. Senner (1922–2003)
- Dee Molenaar (1918–2020)
- Bill Prater (1926–2010)
- Barry Prather (1940–1987)
- James Adam Craig (1924–2011) (only Canadian on the trip)
- William Allard (born 1937), National Geographic Photographer

== Gallery ==
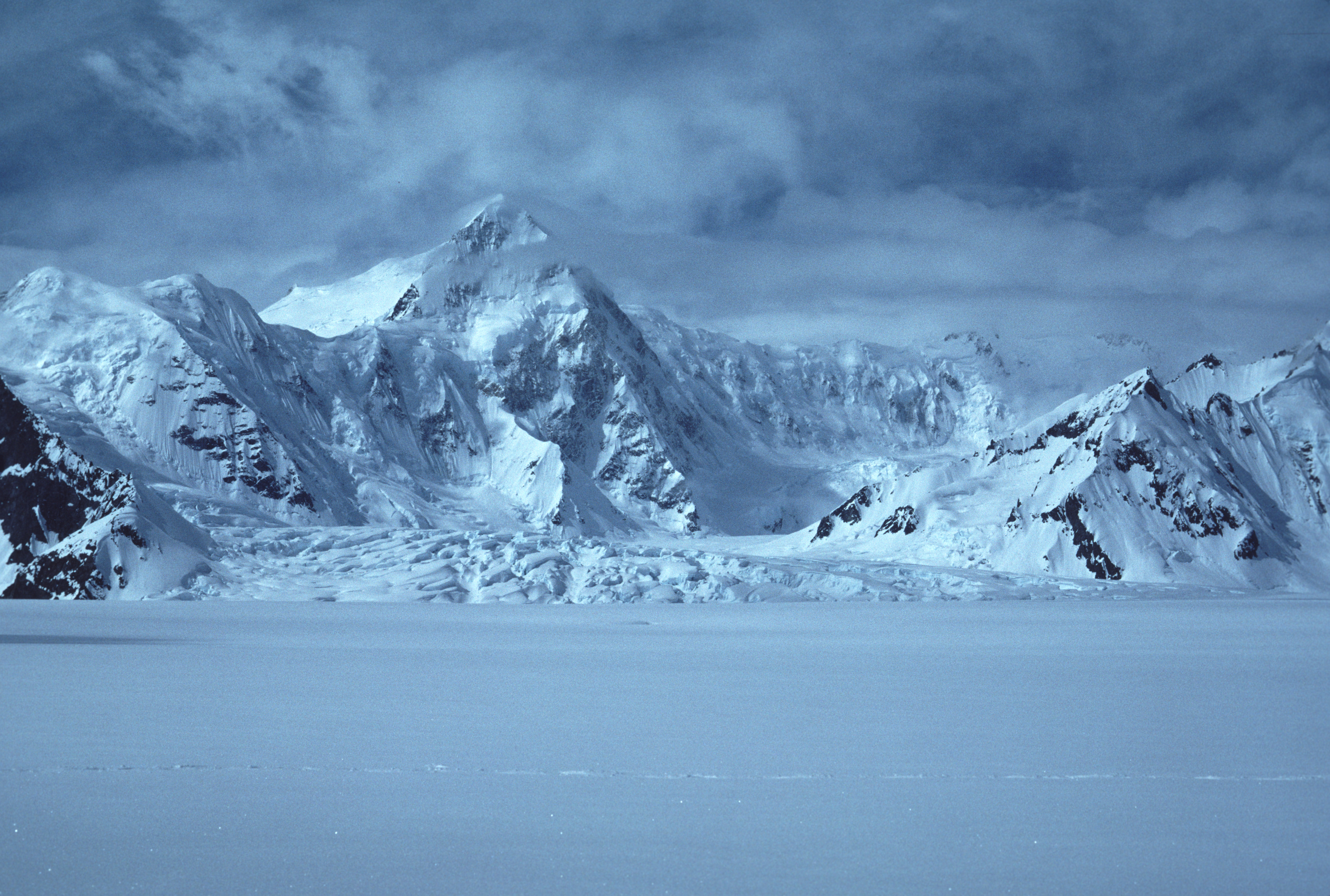
Mount Kennedy from the Lowell Glacier to the north

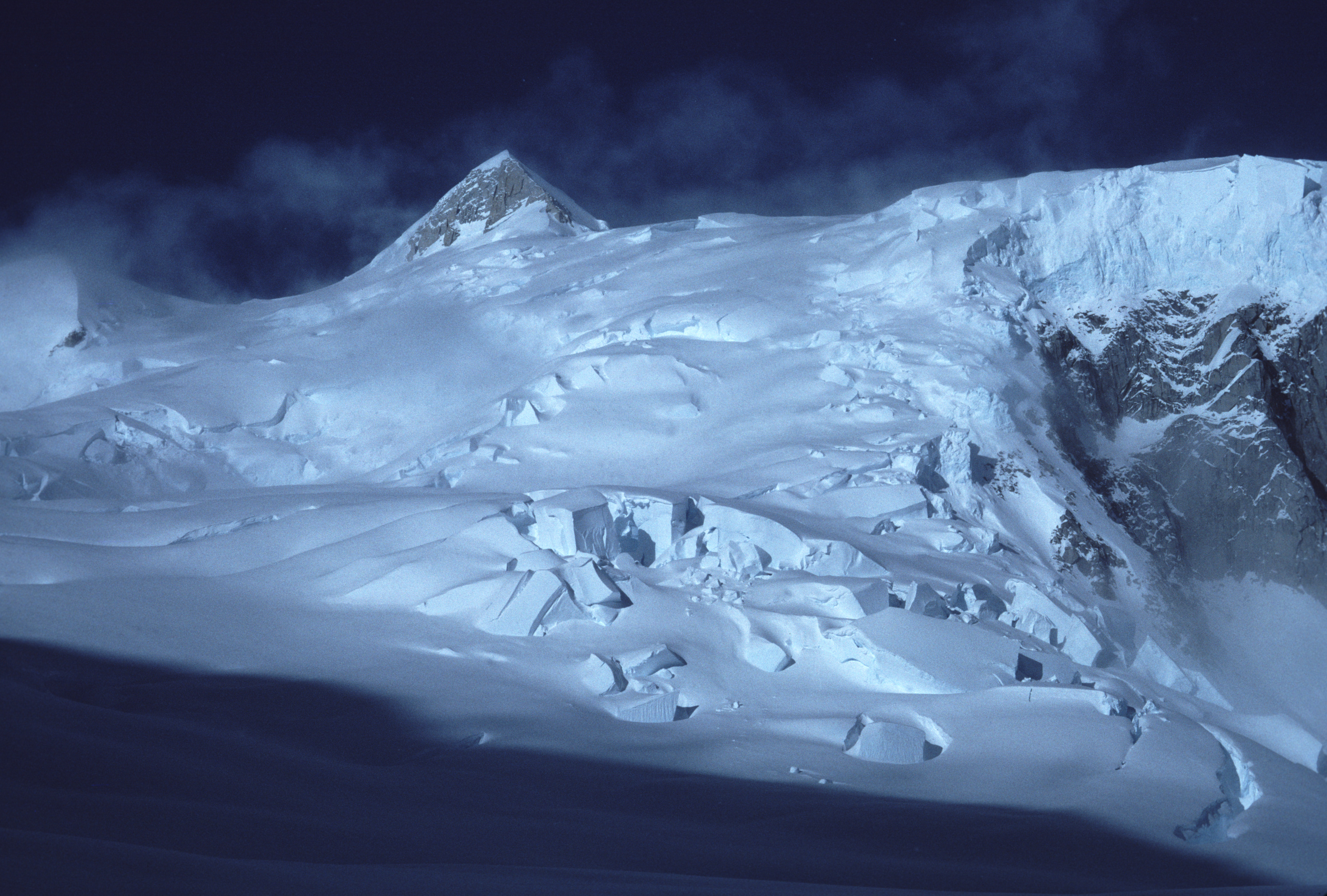
Mount Kennedy from the south

== See also ==
- List of memorials to John F. Kennedy
