= Mountain peaks of Canada =

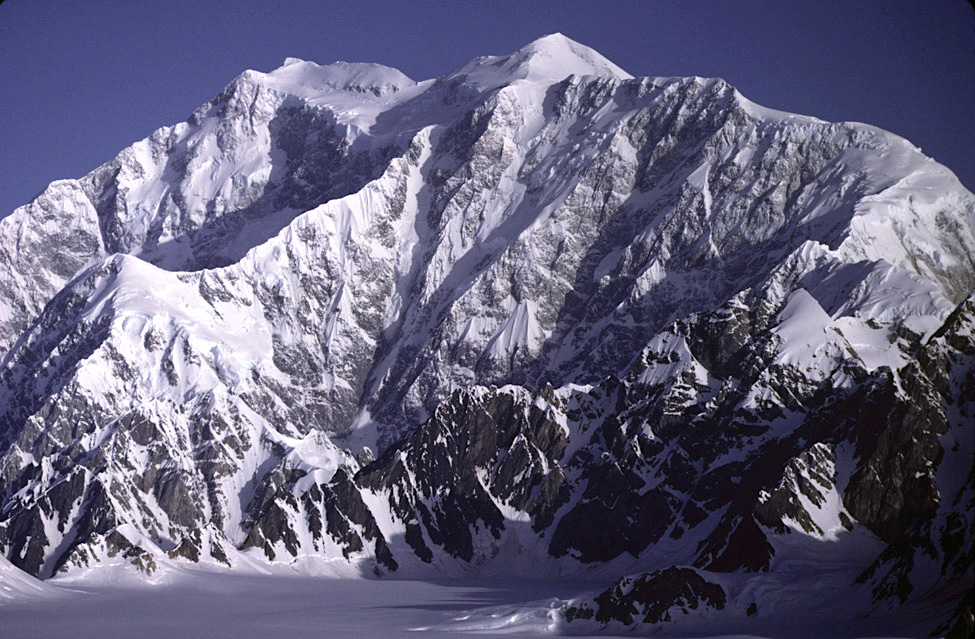
Mount Logan in the Saint Elias Mountains of Yukon is the highest summit of Canada.

This article comprises three sortable tables of major mountain peaks of Canada.

The summit of a mountain or hill may be measured in three principal ways:

1. The topographic elevation of a summit measures the height of the summit above a geodetic sea level. The first table below ranks the 100 highest major summits of Canada by elevation.
2. The topographic prominence of a summit is a measure of how high the summit rises above its surroundings. The second table below ranks the 50 most prominent summits of Canada.
3. The topographic isolation (or radius of dominance) of a summit measures how far the summit lies from its nearest point of equal elevation. The third table below ranks the 50 most isolated major summits of Canada.

== Highest major summits ==
Of the 100 highest major summits of Canada, five peaks exceed 5000 metres (16,404 feet) elevation, 19 peaks exceed 4000 metres (13,123 feet), 67 peaks exceed 3000 metres (9843 feet), and all 100 peaks equal or exceed 2706 metres (8878 feet) elevation.

Of these 100 peaks, 61 are located in British Columbia, 28 in Yukon, 13 in Alberta, and one in the Northwest Territories. Five of these peaks lie on the international border between Yukon and Alaska, four lie on the international border between British Columbia and Alaska, three lie on the border between British Columbia and Alberta, and one lies on the border between British Columbia and Yukon.

The 100 highest summits of Canada with at least 500 metres of topographic prominence
Rank	Mountain peak	Province or Territory	Mountain range	Elevation	Prominence	Isolation	Location
1	Mount Logan (Note: The summit of Mount Logan is the highest point of the Saint Elias Mountains, Yukon, and all of Canada.)	Yukon	Saint Elias Mountains	5956 m 19,541 ft	5247 m 17,215 ft	623 km 387 mi	60.5671°N 140.4055°W
2	Mount Saint Elias (Note: Mount Saint Elias is the second highest major summit of both Canada and the United States.)	Alaska; Yukon	Saint Elias Mountains	5489 m 18,009 ft	3429 m 11,250 ft	41.3 km 25.6 mi	60.2927°N 140.9307°W
3	Mount Lucania (Note: The summit of Mount Lucania is the highest point of the northern Saint Elias Mountains.) (Note: Mount Lucania is the northernmost summit of its elevation in Canada.)	Yukon	Saint Elias Mountains	5260 m 17,257 ft	3080 m 10,105 ft	43 km 26.7 mi	61.0215°N 140.4661°W
4	King Peak	Yukon	Saint Elias Mountains	5173 m 16,972 ft	1073 m 3,520 ft	4.68 km 2.91 mi	60.5833°N 140.6549°W
5	Mount Steele (Note: Mount Steele is the northernmost and easternmost 5000-metre (16,404-foot) summit of Canada.)	Yukon	Saint Elias Mountains	5020 m 16,470 ft	760 m 2,493 ft	9.45 km 5.87 mi	61.0929°N 140.3118°W
6	Mount Wood (Note: Mount Wood is the northernmost summit of its elevation in Canada.)	Yukon	Saint Elias Mountains	4860 m 15,945 ft	1200 m 3,937 ft	18.95 km 11.77 mi	61.2326°N 140.5123°W
7	Mount Vancouver (Note: Mount Vancouver is the easternmost summit of its elevation in Canada.)	Yukon	Saint Elias Mountains	4812 m 15,787 ft	2712 m 8,898 ft	44 km 27.4 mi	60.3589°N 139.6980°W
8	Mount Slaggard	Yukon	Saint Elias Mountains	4742 m 15,558 ft	522 m 1,713 ft	7.74 km 4.81 mi	61.1727°N 140.5851°W
9	Mount Fairweather (Note: Mount Fairweather lies on the international border between Alaska and British Columbia. The peak is the highest point of the Canadian Province of British Columbia and the southernmost and easternmost summit of its elevation in both Canada and the United States.) (Fairweather Mountain)	Alaska; British Columbia	Saint Elias Mountains	4671 m 15,325 ft	3961 m 12,995 ft	200 km 124.4 mi	58.9064°N 137.5265°W
10	Mount Hubbard	Alaska; Yukon	Saint Elias Mountains	4557 m 14,951 ft	2457 m 8,061 ft	34.4 km 21.3 mi	60.3194°N 139.0726°W
11	Mount Walsh	Yukon	Saint Elias Mountains	4506 m 14,783 ft	1366 m 4,482 ft	18.76 km 11.66 mi	61.0037°N 140.0171°W
12	Mount Alverstone (Boundary Point 180)	Alaska; Yukon	Saint Elias Mountains	4420 m 14,500 ft	594 m 1,950 ft	3.62 km 2.25 mi	60.3518°N 139.0749°W
13	McArthur Peak	Yukon	Saint Elias Mountains	4380 m 14,370 ft	960 m 3,150 ft	9.1 km 5.65 mi	60.6069°N 140.2144°W
14	Mount Augusta	Alaska; Yukon	Saint Elias Mountains	4289 m 14,070 ft	1549 m 5,082 ft	23.2 km 14.41 mi	60.3074°N 140.4584°W
15	Mount Strickland (Note: Mount Strickland is the northernmost summit of its elevation in Canada.)	Yukon	Saint Elias Mountains	4260 m 13,976 ft	800 m 2,625 ft	7.35 km 4.57 mi	61.2365°N 140.6755°W
16	Avalanche Peak (Note: Avalanche Peak is the northernmost summit of its elevation in Canada.)	Yukon	Saint Elias Mountains	4228 m 13,871 ft	608 m 1,995 ft	4.54 km 2.82 mi	61.2401°N 140.7597°W
17	Mount Cook	Alaska; Yukon	Saint Elias Mountains	4194 m 13,760 ft	2350 m 7,710 ft	23.4 km 14.54 mi	60.1816°N 139.9811°W
18	Mount Craig (Note: Mount Craig is the northernmost 4000-metre (13,123-foot) summit of Canada.)	Yukon	Saint Elias Mountains	4060 m 13,320 ft	520 m 1,706 ft	6.97 km 4.33 mi	61.2636°N 140.8800°W
19	Mount Waddington (Note: The summit of Mount Waddington is the highest point of the Coast Mountains.) (Note: Mount Waddington is the southernmost and easternmost 4000-metre (13,123-foot) summit of Canada.)	British Columbia	Coast Mountains	4019 m 13,186 ft	3289 m 10,791 ft	562 km 349 mi	51.3737°N 125.2636°W
20	Spring Glacier Peak	Yukon	Saint Elias Mountains	3976 m 13,045 ft	676 m 2,218 ft	6 km 3.73 mi	61.0408°N 139.9328°W
21	Mount Robson (Note: The summit of Mount Robson is the highest point of the Canadian Rockies.) (Note: Mount Robson is the easternmost summit of its elevation in Canada and the northernmost and westernmost summit of its elevation in the Rocky Mountains.)	British Columbia	Canadian Rockies	3959 m 12,989 ft	2829 m 9,281 ft	460 km 286 mi	53.1105°N 119.1566°W
22	Mount Harrison (Yukon)	Yukon	Saint Elias Mountains	3935 m 12,910 ft	875 m 2,871 ft	11 km 6.84 mi	61.0781°N 140.1019°W
23	Mount Queen Mary	Yukon	Saint Elias Mountains	3928 m 12,887 ft	1348 m 4,423 ft	25.3 km 15.69 mi	60.6286°N 139.7247°W
23	Mount Root	Alaska; British Columbia	Saint Elias Mountains	3928 m 12,887 ft	908 m 2,979 ft	8.79 km 5.46 mi	58.9854°N 137.5001°W
25	Mount Tiedemann	British Columbia	Coast Mountains	3838 m 12,592 ft	848 m 2,782 ft	2.86 km 1.78 mi	51.3940°N 125.2366°W
26	Centennial Peak	Yukon	Saint Elias Mountains	3820 m 12,533 ft	960 m 3,150 ft	9.77 km 6.07 mi	60.9470°N 140.7217°W
27	Mount Malaspina	Yukon	Saint Elias Mountains	3776 m 12,388 ft	936 m 3,071 ft	6.39 km 3.97 mi	60.3182°N 140.5719°W
28	Mount Columbia (Note: Mount Columbia on the Great Divide between British Columbia and Alberta is the highest point of the Columbia Icefield, the Province of Alberta, and the entire Beaufort Sea Drainage basin.)	Alberta; British Columbia	Canadian Rockies	3741 m 12,274 ft	2371 m 7,779 ft	158 km 98.2 mi	52.1473°N 117.4416°W
28	Mount King George	Yukon	Saint Elias Mountains	3741 m 12,274 ft	1281 m 4,203 ft	11.3 km 7.02 mi	60.5314°N 139.7841°W
30	Mount Johansen	Yukon	Saint Elias Mountains	3740 m 12,270 ft	560 m 1,837 ft	20 km 12.43 mi	60.6832°N 140.6823°W
31	North Twin Peak (Note: North Twin Peak is the easternmost summit of its elevation in Canada.)	Alberta	Canadian Rockies	3733 m 12,247 ft	743 m 2,438 ft	8.52 km 5.29 mi	52.2238°N 117.4345°W
32	Mount Clemenceau (Note: The summit of Mount Clemenceau is the highest point of the Clémenceau Icefield.)	British Columbia	Canadian Rockies	3664 m 12,021 ft	1494 m 4,902 ft	35.9 km 22.3 mi	52.2475°N 117.9578°W
33	Mount Alberta (Note: The summit of Mount Alberta is the highest point of the Winston Churchill Range.)	Alberta	Canadian Rockies	3620 m 11,877 ft	800 m 2,625 ft	6.86 km 4.26 mi	52.2850°N 117.4772°W
34	Mount Forbes (Note: The summit of Mount Forbes is the highest point of the entire Hudson Bay drainage basin.) (Note: Mount Forbes is the easternmost summit of its elevation in Canada.)	Alberta	Canadian Rockies	3617 m 11,867 ft	1649 m 5,410 ft	47.4 km 29.5 mi	51.8600°N 116.9316°W
35	Mount Assiniboine (Note: Mount Assiniboine is the southernmost and easternmost summit of its elevation in Canada.)	Alberta; British Columbia	Canadian Rockies	3616 m 11,864 ft	2082 m 6,831 ft	141.8 km 88.1 mi	50.8696°N 115.6509°W
36	Mount Goodsir (Note: The summit of Mount Goodsir is the highest point of the Ottertail Range.)	British Columbia	Canadian Rockies	3567 m 11,703 ft	1917 m 6,289 ft	64.1 km 39.8 mi	51.2021°N 116.3975°W
37	Monarch Mountain (Note: The summit of Monarch Mountain is the highest point of the Monarch Icefield.)	British Columbia	Coast Mountains	3555 m 11,663 ft	2925 m 9,596 ft	71.4 km 44.4 mi	51.8995°N 125.8760°W
38	Mount Temple (Note: The summit of Mount Temple is the highest point of the Bow Range.)	Alberta	Canadian Rockies	3540 m 11,614 ft	1530 m 5,020 ft	21.3 km 13.22 mi	51.3511°N 116.2063°W
39	Mount Brazeau	Alberta	Canadian Rockies	3525 m 11,565 ft	1475 m 4,839 ft	30.8 km 19.14 mi	52.5515°N 117.3549°W
40	Mount Sir Sandford (Note: The summit of Mount Sir Sandford is the highest point of the Columbia Mountains.)	British Columbia	Columbia Mountains	3519 m 11,545 ft	2703 m 8,868 ft	62 km 38.5 mi	51.6566°N 117.8676°W
41	Mount Sir Wilfrid Laurier (Note: The summit of Mount Sir Wilfrid Laurier is the highest point of the Cariboo Mountains.)	British Columbia	Columbia Mountains	3516 m 11,535 ft	2728 m 8,950 ft	51.7 km 32.1 mi	52.8015°N 119.7315°W
42	Mount Farnham (Note: The summit of Mount Farnham is the highest point of the Purcell Mountains.) (Note: Mount Farnham is the southernmost summit of its elevation in Canada.)	British Columbia	Columbia Mountains	3493 m 11,460 ft	2123 m 6,965 ft	72.7 km 45.2 mi	50.4888°N 116.4871°W
43	Mount Joffre (Note: Mount Joffre is the easternmost summit of its elevation in Canada.)	Alberta; British Columbia	Canadian Rockies	3433 m 11,263 ft	1505 m 4,938 ft	49.2 km 30.6 mi	50.5285°N 115.2069°W
44	Howser Spire	British Columbia	Columbia Mountains	3412 m 11,194 ft	1299 m 4,262 ft	35.4 km 22 mi	50.7296°N 116.8134°W
45	Whitehorn Mountain (Note: Whitehorn Mountain is the northernmost and westernmost summit of its elevation in the Rocky Mountains.)	British Columbia	Canadian Rockies	3399 m 11,152 ft	1747 m 5,732 ft	7.94 km 4.93 mi	53.1370°N 119.2667°W
46	Mount Hector	Alberta	Canadian Rockies	3394 m 11,135 ft	1759 m 5,771 ft	21.5 km 13.34 mi	51.5752°N 116.2590°W
47	Mount Dawson	British Columbia	Columbia Mountains	3377 m 11,079 ft	2045 m 6,709 ft	63.4 km 39.4 mi	51.1516°N 117.4206°W
48	Mount Edith Cavell	Alberta	Canadian Rockies	3363 m 11,033 ft	2033 m 6,670 ft	47.2 km 29.3 mi	52.6672°N 118.0569°W
49	Mount Fryatt (Note: The summit of Mount Fryatt is the highest point of the Hooker Icefield.)	Alberta	Canadian Rockies	3361 m 11,027 ft	1608 m 5,276 ft	16.37 km 10.17 mi	52.5503°N 117.9104°W
50	Mount Harrison (British Columbia) (Note: Mount Harrison (British Columbia) is the southernmost and easternmost 3000-metre (9843-foot) summit of Canada.)	British Columbia	Canadian Rockies	3360 m 11,024 ft	1770 m 5,807 ft	52.1 km 32.4 mi	50.0604°N 115.2057°W
51	Mount Chown (Note: Mount Chown is the northernmost and westernmost summit of its elevation in the Rocky Mountains.)	Alberta	Canadian Rockies	3316 m 10,879 ft	1746 m 5,728 ft	30.7 km 19.05 mi	53.3971°N 119.4173°W
52	Mount Nelson	British Columbia	Columbia Mountains	3313 m 10,869 ft	523 m 1,716 ft	7.22 km 4.49 mi	50.4601°N 116.3515°W
53	Mount Queen Bess (Note: The summit of Mount Queen Bess is the highest point of the Homathko Icefield.)	British Columbia	Coast Mountains	3298 m 10,820 ft	2355 m 7,726 ft	45.5 km 28.2 mi	51.2714°N 124.5682°W
54	Mount Sir Donald (Note: The summit of Mount Sir Donald is the highest point of the Sir Donald Range.)	British Columbia	Selkirk Mountains	3284 m 10,774 ft	874 m 2,867 ft	12.38 km 7.69 mi	51.2631°N 117.4314°W
55	Mount Sir Alexander (Note: Mount Sir Alexander is the northernmost and westernmost 3000-metre (9843-foot) summit and ultra-prominent summit of the Rocky Mountains.)	British Columbia	Canadian Rockies	3275 m 10,745 ft	1762 m 5,781 ft	87.8 km 54.5 mi	53.9360°N 120.3869°W
56	Mount Monashee (Note: The summit of Mount Monashee is the highest point of the Monashee Mountains.)	British Columbia	Columbia Mountains	3274 m 10,741 ft	2404 m 7,887 ft	51.8 km 32.2 mi	52.3853°N 118.9399°W
57	Good Hope Mountain (Note: The summit of Good Hope Mountain is the highest point of the Bugaboos.)	British Columbia	Coast Mountains	3242 m 10,636 ft	1497 m 4,911 ft	31.2 km 19.38 mi	51.1425°N 124.1719°W
58	Mount Ida (Note: Mount Ida is the northernmost 3000-metre (9843-foot) summit and ultra-prominent summit of the Rocky Mountains.)	British Columbia	Canadian Rockies	3200 m 10,499 ft	1530 m 5,020 ft	14.14 km 8.79 mi	54.0580°N 120.3268°W
59	Razorback Mountain (Note: The summit of Razorback Mountain is the highest point of the Niut Range.)	British Columbia	Coast Mountains	3183 m 10,443 ft	2153 m 7,064 ft	36.5 km 22.7 mi	51.5905°N 124.6912°W
60	Monmouth Mountain (Note: The summit of Monmouth Mountain is the highest point of the Lillooet Icefield.) (Mount Monmouth)	British Columbia	Coast Mountains	3182 m 10,440 ft	1602 m 5,256 ft	31.6 km 19.6 mi	50.9924°N 123.7900°W
61	Mount Cooper (Note: The summit of Mount Cooper is the highest point of the Goat Range.)	British Columbia	Columbia Mountains	3094 m 10,151 ft	2319 m 7,608 ft	42.5 km 26.4 mi	50.1797°N 117.1992°W
62	Mount Ratz (Note: The summit of Mount Ratz is the highest point of the Boundary Ranges.)	British Columbia	Coast Mountains	3090 m 10,138 ft	2430 m 7,972 ft	311 km 193.4 mi	57.3930°N 132.3031°W
63	Jeanette Peak	British Columbia	Canadian Rockies	3089 m 10,135 ft	1657 m 5,436 ft	17.54 km 10.9 mi	52.6357°N 118.6166°W
64	Mount Tatlow	British Columbia	Coast Mountains	3063 m 10,049 ft	1613 m 5,292 ft	34.4 km 21.4 mi	51.3843°N 123.8641°W
65	Kates Needle	Alaska; British Columbia	Coast Mountains	3053 m 10,016 ft	1383 m 4,537 ft	41.8 km 26 mi	57.0449°N 132.0451°W
66	Talchako Mountain	British Columbia	Coast Mountains	3037 m 9,964 ft	1676 m 5,499 ft	19.23 km 11.95 mi	52.0919°N 126.0159°W
67	Ulysses Mountain (Note: The summit of Ulysses Mountain is the highest point of the Far Northern Rockies.) (Note: Ulysses Mountain is the northernmost 3000-metre (9843-foot) summit of the Rocky Mountains.) (Mount Ulysses)	British Columbia	Muskwa Ranges	3024 m 9,921 ft	2294 m 7,526 ft	436 km 271 mi	57.3464°N 124.0928°W
68	Scud Peak	British Columbia	Coast Mountains	2987 m 9,800 ft	2172 m 7,126 ft	57.4 km 35.7 mi	57.2412°N 131.1676°W
69	Mount Brett (Note: The summit of Mount Brett is the highest point of the Massive Range.)	Alberta	Massive Range	2984 m 9,790 ft	899 m 2,949 ft	12.94 km 8.04 mi	51.1621°N 115.8216°W
70	Mount Odin (Note: The summit of Mount Odin is the highest point of the Gold Range.)	British Columbia	Columbia Mountains	2971 m 9,747 ft	2409 m 7,904 ft	65.4 km 40.7 mi	50.5518°N 118.1293°W
71	Skihist Mountain (Note: The summit of Skihist Mountain is the highest point of the Lillooet Range.)	British Columbia	Coast Mountains	2968 m 9,738 ft	2458 m 8,064 ft	157.1 km 97.6 mi	50.1878°N 121.9032°W
72	Ambition Mountain	British Columbia	Coast Mountains	2953 m 9,688 ft	1513 m 4,964 ft	25.7 km 15.95 mi	57.3949°N 131.4851°W
73	Keele Peak (Note: The summit of Keele Peak is the highest point of the Mackenzie Mountains.) (Note: Keele Peak is the northernmost summit of its elevation in Canada.)	Yukon	Mackenzie Mountains	2952 m 9,685 ft	2161 m 7,090 ft	543 km 337 mi	63.4314°N 130.3243°W
74	Mount Ovington	British Columbia	Hart Ranges	2949 m 9,675 ft	1600 m 5,249 ft	18.75 km 11.65 mi	54.1433°N 120.5740°W
75	Mount Sylvia	British Columbia	Muskwa Ranges	2940 m 9,646 ft	1559 m 5,115 ft	73.8 km 45.9 mi	58.0820°N 124.4688°W
76	Whitecap Mountain (Note: The summit of Whitecap Mountain is the highest point of the Bendor Range.)	British Columbia	Coast Mountains	2918 m 9,573 ft	1533 m 5,030 ft	71.4 km 44.4 mi	50.7162°N 122.5085°W
77	Mount Saugstad	British Columbia	Coast Mountains	2908 m 9,541 ft	1850 m 6,070 ft	38.6 km 24 mi	52.2542°N 126.5148°W
78	The Horn	British Columbia	Coast Mountains	2907 m 9,537 ft	1527 m 5,010 ft	20.3 km 12.63 mi	52.3190°N 126.2363°W
79	Chutine Peak	British Columbia	Coast Mountains	2903 m 9,524 ft	1758 m 5,768 ft	42.6 km 26.5 mi	57.7753°N 132.3346°W
80	Wedge Mountain	British Columbia	Coast Mountains	2892 m 9,488 ft	2249 m 7,379 ft	63.9 km 39.7 mi	50.1330°N 122.7933°W
81	Silverthrone Mountain (Note: The summit of Silverthrone Mountain is the highest point of the Ha-Iltzuk Icefield.)	British Columbia	Coast Mountains	2864 m 9,396 ft	974 m 3,196 ft	40.1 km 24.9 mi	51.5180°N 126.1133°W
82	Mount Seton (Note: The summit of Mount Seton is the highest point of the Cayoosh Range.) (Goat Mountain)	British Columbia	Coast Mountains	2855 m 9,367 ft	1580 m 5,184 ft	20.4 km 12.64 mi	50.6237°N 122.2600°W
83	Mount Aylesworth	Alaska; British Columbia	Saint Elias Mountains	2830 m 9,285 ft	1420 m 4,659 ft	27.1 km 16.81 mi	59.9242°N 138.7985°W
84	Gladsheim Peak (Note: Gladsheim Peak is the southernmost summit of its elevation in Canada.)	British Columbia	Columbia Mountains	2830 m 9,285 ft	2056 m 6,745 ft	53.4 km 33.2 mi	49.7867°N 117.6272°W
85	Mount Cairnes	Yukon	Saint Elias Mountains	2820 m 9,252 ft	2000 m 6,562 ft	40.2 km 25 mi	60.8683°N 138.2764°W
86	Cond Peak (Note: The summit of Cond Peak is the highest point of the Kokanee Range.) (Note: Cond Peak is the southernmost summit of its elevation in Canada.)	British Columbia	Columbia Mountains	2801 m 9,190 ft	1720 m 5,643 ft	35.3 km 21.9 mi	49.7462°N 117.1419°W
87	Mount Edziza	British Columbia	Coast Mountains	2793 m 9,163 ft	1763 m 5,784 ft	61.8 km 38.4 mi	57.7156°N 130.6345°W
88	Mount Nirvana (Note: The summit of Mount Nirvana is the highest point of the Northwest Territories of Canada.)	Northwest Territories	Mackenzie Mountains	2773 m 9,098 ft	1663 m 5,456 ft	220 km 136.8 mi	61.8752°N 127.6807°W
89	Mount Macdonald (Note: The summit of Mount Macdonald is the highest point of the Bonnet Plume Mountains.) (Note: Mount Macdonald is the northernmost summit of its elevation in Canada.)	Yukon	Mackenzie Mountains	2760 m 9,055 ft	1555 m 5,102 ft	187.5 km 116.5 mi	64.7256°N 132.7781°W
90	Howson Peak (Note: The summit of Howson Peak is the highest point of the Hazleton Mountains.)	British Columbia	Coast Mountains	2759 m 9,052 ft	1829 m 6,001 ft	254 km 158 mi	54.4185°N 127.7441°W
91	Tsaydaychuz Peak	British Columbia	Coast Mountains	2758 m 9,049 ft	1826 m 5,991 ft	82.8 km 51.4 mi	53.0212°N 126.6401°W
92	Overseer Mountain (Note: The summit of Overseer Mountain is the highest point of the Pemberton Icefield.)	British Columbia	Coast Mountains	2749 m 9,019 ft	1679 m 5,509 ft	19.39 km 12.05 mi	50.5288°N 123.3809°W
93	Thudaka Mountain (Note: The summit of Thudaka Mountain is the highest point of Cassiar Mountains.)	British Columbia	Cassiar Mountains	2748 m 9,016 ft	1739 m 5,705 ft	103.5 km 64.3 mi	57.9272°N 126.8485°W
94	Seven Sisters Peaks	British Columbia	Coast Mountains	2747 m 9,012 ft	1862 m 6,109 ft	68.8 km 42.7 mi	54.9678°N 128.2319°W
95	Alsek Peak	Yukon	Saint Elias Mountains	2740 m 8,990 ft	2025 m 6,644 ft	68.5 km 42.5 mi	60.0325°N 137.5915°W
96	Mount Jancowski	British Columbia	Coast Mountains	2729 m 8,953 ft	2079 m 6,821 ft	124 km 77.1 mi	56.3372°N 129.9817°W
97	Mount Pattullo	British Columbia	Coast Mountains	2727 m 8,947 ft	1617 m 5,305 ft	23.1 km 14.37 mi	56.2339°N 129.6576°W
98	Atna Peak	British Columbia	Coast Mountains	2724 m 8,937 ft	1828 m 5,997 ft	56.8 km 35.3 mi	53.9398°N 128.0456°W
99	Buckwell Peak	British Columbia; Yukon	Saint Elias Mountains	2721 m 8,927 ft	1971 m 6,467 ft	56.4 km 35 mi	59.4188°N 136.7653°W
100	Basement Peak	British Columbia	Saint Elias Mountains	2706 m 8,878 ft	1606 m 5,269 ft	23.6 km 14.66 mi	59.3551°N 137.1614°W

== Most prominent summits ==
Of the 50 most prominent summits of Canada, only Mount Logan exceeds 4000 metres (13,123 feet) of topographic prominence, five peaks exceed 3000 metres (9843 feet), 41 peaks exceed 2000 metres (6562 feet), and all 50 peaks equal or exceed 1866 metres (6122 feet) of topographic prominence. All of these peaks are ultra-prominent summits.

Of these 50 peaks, 34 are located in British Columbia, nine in Yukon, six in Nunavut, and three in Alberta. Three of these peaks lie on the international border between Yukon and Alaska, one lies on the international border between British Columbia and Alaska, two lie on the border between British Columbia and Alberta, and two lie on the border between British Columbia and Yukon.

The 50 most topographically prominent summits of Canada
Rank	Mountain peak	Province or Territory	Mountain range	Elevation	Prominence	Isolation	Location
1	Mount Logan	Yukon	Saint Elias Mountains	5956 m 19,541 ft	5247 m 17,215 ft	623 km 387 mi	60.5671°N 140.4055°W
2	Mount Fairweather (Fairweather Mountain)	Alaska; British Columbia	Saint Elias Mountains	4671 m 15,325 ft	3961 m 12,995 ft	200 km 124.4 mi	58.9064°N 137.5265°W
3	Mount Saint Elias	Alaska; Yukon	Saint Elias Mountains	5489 m 18,009 ft	3429 m 11,250 ft	41.3 km 25.6 mi	60.2927°N 140.9307°W
4	Mount Waddington	British Columbia	Coast Mountains	4019 m 13,186 ft	3289 m 10,791 ft	562 km 349 mi	51.3737°N 125.2636°W
5	Mount Lucania	Yukon	Saint Elias Mountains	5260 m 17,257 ft	3080 m 10,105 ft	43 km 26.7 mi	61.0215°N 140.4661°W
6	Monarch Mountain	British Columbia	Coast Mountains	3555 m 11,663 ft	2925 m 9,596 ft	71.4 km 44.4 mi	51.8995°N 125.8760°W
7	Mount Robson	British Columbia	Canadian Rockies	3959 m 12,989 ft	2829 m 9,281 ft	460 km 286 mi	53.1105°N 119.1566°W
8	Mount Sir Wilfrid Laurier	British Columbia	Columbia Mountains	3516 m 11,535 ft	2728 m 8,950 ft	51.7 km 32.1 mi	52.8015°N 119.7315°W
9	Mount Vancouver	Yukon	Saint Elias Mountains	4812 m 15,787 ft	2712 m 8,898 ft	44 km 27.4 mi	60.3589°N 139.6980°W
10	Mount Sir Sandford	British Columbia	Columbia Mountains	3519 m 11,545 ft	2703 m 8,868 ft	62 km 38.5 mi	51.6566°N 117.8676°W
11	Barbeau Peak (Note: The summit of Barbeau Peak is the highest point of Ellesmere Island and Nunavut of Canada.) (Note: Barbeau Peak is the northernmost ultra-prominent summit of Canada and greater North America.)	Nunavut	Ellesmere Island	2616 m 8,583 ft	2616 m 8,583 ft	796 km 495 mi	81.9148°N 75.0093°W
12	Skihist Mountain	British Columbia	Coast Mountains	2968 m 9,738 ft	2458 m 8,064 ft	157.1 km 97.6 mi	50.1878°N 121.9032°W
13	Mount Hubbard	Alaska; Yukon	Saint Elias Mountains	4557 m 14,951 ft	2457 m 8,061 ft	34.4 km 21.3 mi	60.3194°N 139.0726°W
14	Mount Ratz	British Columbia	Coast Mountains	3090 m 10,138 ft	2430 m 7,972 ft	311 km 193.4 mi	57.3930°N 132.3031°W
15	Mount Odin	British Columbia	Columbia Mountains	2971 m 9,747 ft	2409 m 7,904 ft	65.4 km 40.7 mi	50.5518°N 118.1293°W
16	Mount Monashee	British Columbia	Columbia Mountains	3274 m 10,741 ft	2404 m 7,887 ft	51.8 km 32.2 mi	52.3853°N 118.9399°W
17	Mount Columbia	Alberta; British Columbia	Canadian Rockies	3741 m 12,274 ft	2371 m 7,779 ft	158 km 98.2 mi	52.1473°N 117.4416°W
18	Mount Queen Bess	British Columbia	Coast Mountains	3298 m 10,820 ft	2355 m 7,726 ft	45.5 km 28.2 mi	51.2714°N 124.5682°W
19	Mount Cook	Alaska; Yukon	Saint Elias Mountains	4194 m 13,760 ft	2350 m 7,710 ft	23.4 km 14.54 mi	60.1816°N 139.9811°W
20	Mount Cooper	British Columbia	Columbia Mountains	3094 m 10,151 ft	2319 m 7,608 ft	42.5 km 26.4 mi	50.1797°N 117.1992°W
21	Ulysses Mountain (Mount Ulysses)	British Columbia	Muskwa Ranges	3024 m 9,921 ft	2294 m 7,526 ft	436 km 271 mi	57.3464°N 124.0928°W
22	Wedge Mountain	British Columbia	Coast Mountains	2892 m 9,488 ft	2249 m 7,379 ft	63.9 km 39.7 mi	50.1330°N 122.7933°W
23	Otter Mountain	British Columbia	Coast Mountains	2692 m 8,832 ft	2242 m 7,356 ft	25.4 km 15.78 mi	56.0066°N 129.6928°W
24	Kwatna Peak	British Columbia	Coast Mountains	2290 m 7,513 ft	2225 m 7,300 ft	36.9 km 22.9 mi	52.0706°N 126.9630°W
25	Outlook Peak (Note: The summit of Outlook Peak is the highest point of Axel Heiberg Island.)	Nunavut	Axel Heiberg Island	2210 m 7,251 ft	2210 m 7,251 ft	268 km 166.3 mi	79.7397°N 91.4061°W
26	Golden Hinde (Note: The summit of Golden Hinde is the highest point of Vancouver Island.)	British Columbia	Vancouver Island	2197 m 7,208 ft	2197 m 7,208 ft	134.3 km 83.4 mi	49.6627°N 125.7470°W
27	Scud Peak	British Columbia	Coast Mountains	2987 m 9,800 ft	2172 m 7,126 ft	57.4 km 35.7 mi	57.2412°N 131.1676°W
28	Keele Peak	Yukon	Mackenzie Mountains	2952 m 9,685 ft	2161 m 7,090 ft	543 km 337 mi	63.4314°N 130.3243°W
29	Razorback Mountain	British Columbia	Coast Mountains	3183 m 10,443 ft	2153 m 7,064 ft	36.5 km 22.7 mi	51.5905°N 124.6912°W
30	Mount Odin (Note: The summit of Mount Odin is the highest point of Baffin Island.) (Note: Mount Odin is the easternmost summit of its elevation in Canada.)	Nunavut	Baffin Island	2143 m 7,031 ft	2143 m 7,031 ft	586 km 364 mi	66.5468°N 65.4289°W
31	Mount Farnham	British Columbia	Columbia Mountains	3493 m 11,460 ft	2123 m 6,965 ft	72.7 km 45.2 mi	50.4888°N 116.4871°W
32	Oscar Peak	British Columbia	Coast Mountains	2336 m 7,664 ft	2099 m 6,886 ft	35.5 km 22 mi	54.9289°N 129.0594°W
33	Mount Assiniboine	Alberta; British Columbia	Canadian Rockies	3616 m 11,864 ft	2082 m 6,831 ft	141.8 km 88.1 mi	50.8696°N 115.6509°W
34	Mount Jancowski	British Columbia	Coast Mountains	2729 m 8,953 ft	2079 m 6,821 ft	124 km 77.1 mi	56.3372°N 129.9817°W
35	Gladsheim Peak	British Columbia	Columbia Mountains	2830 m 9,285 ft	2056 m 6,745 ft	53.4 km 33.2 mi	49.7867°N 117.6272°W
36	Mount Dawson	British Columbia	Columbia Mountains	3377 m 11,079 ft	2045 m 6,709 ft	63.4 km 39.4 mi	51.1516°N 117.4206°W
37	Beitstad Peak	Nunavut	Ellesmere Island	2347 m 7,700 ft	2044 m 6,706 ft	354 km 220 mi	78.8007°N 79.5292°W
38	Mount Edith Cavell	Alberta	Canadian Rockies	3363 m 11,033 ft	2033 m 6,670 ft	47.2 km 29.3 mi	52.6672°N 118.0569°W
39	Alsek Peak	Yukon	Saint Elias Mountains	2740 m 8,990 ft	2025 m 6,644 ft	68.5 km 42.5 mi	60.0325°N 137.5915°W
40	Mount Valpy	British Columbia	Coast Mountains	2219 m 7,280 ft	2014 m 6,608 ft	49.4 km 30.7 mi	54.2750°N 129.0564°W
41	Mount Cairnes	Yukon	Saint Elias Mountains	2820 m 9,252 ft	2000 m 6,562 ft	40.2 km 25 mi	60.8683°N 138.2764°W
42	Chatsquot Mountain	British Columbia	Coast Mountains	2365 m 7,759 ft	1981 m 6,499 ft	57.7 km 35.8 mi	53.1422°N 127.4773°W
43	Buckwell Peak	British Columbia; Yukon	Saint Elias Mountains	2721 m 8,927 ft	1971 m 6,467 ft	56.4 km 35 mi	59.4188°N 136.7653°W
44	Mount Priestley	British Columbia	Coast Mountains	2366 m 7,762 ft	1945 m 6,381 ft	50.4 km 31.3 mi	55.2297°N 128.8759°W
45	Angilaaq Mountain (Note: The summit of Angilaaq Mountain is the highest point of Bylot Island.)	Nunavut	Bylot Island	1944 m 6,378 ft	1944 m 6,378 ft	622 km 387 mi	73.2298°N 78.6230°W
46	Devon Ice Cap high point (Note: The summit of Devon Ice Cap high point is the highest point of Devon Island.)	Nunavut	Devon Island	1920 m 6,300 ft	1920 m 6,300 ft	265 km 164.6 mi	75.3429°N 82.6186°W
47	Mount Goodsir	British Columbia	Canadian Rockies	3567 m 11,703 ft	1917 m 6,289 ft	64.1 km 39.8 mi	51.2021°N 116.3975°W
48	Sharks Teeth Peaks	British Columbia	Coast Mountains	2304 m 7,559 ft	1914 m 6,280 ft	21.9 km 13.6 mi	53.0071°N 127.2400°W
49	Detour Peak	British Columbia; Yukon	Saint Elias Mountains	2550 m 8,366 ft	1906 m 6,253 ft	21.2 km 13.16 mi	59.8424°N 137.5856°W
50	Silvertip Mountain (Note: The summit of Silvertip Mountain is the highest point of the Hope Mountains.) (Note: Silvertip Mountain is the southernmost ultra-prominent summit of Canada.)	British Columbia	Cascade Range	2596 m 8,517 ft	1866 m 6,122 ft	19.55 km 12.15 mi	49.1633°N 121.2161°W

== Most isolated major summits ==
Of the 50 most isolated major summits of Canada, 12 peaks exceed 500 kilometres (310.7 miles) of topographic isolation, 31 peaks exceed 200 kilometres (124.3 miles), and all 50 peaks exceed 100 kilometres (62.14 miles) of topographic isolation.

Of these 50 peaks, 17 are located in British Columbia, 13 in Nunavut, seven in Yukon, four in Newfoundland and Labrador, four in Quebec, three in the Northwest Territories, two in Alberta, and one each in Nova Scotia and New Brunswick. Two of these peaks lie on the international border between British Columbia and Alaska, and two lie on the border between British Columbia and Alberta.

The 50 most topographically isolated summits of Canada with at least 500 metres of topographic prominence
Rank	Mountain peak	Province or Territory	Mountain range	Elevation	Prominence	Isolation	Location
1	Barbeau Peak	Nunavut	Ellesmere Island	2616 m 8,583 ft	2616 m 8,583 ft	796 km 495 mi	81.9148°N 75.0093°W
2	Mount Caubvick (Note: The summit of Mount Caubvick is the highest point of the Torngat Mountains, the Province of Newfoundland and Labrador, and all of eastern Canada.) (Mont d'Iberville)	Newfoundland and Labrador; Quebec	Torngat Mountains	1652 m 5,420 ft	1367 m 4,485 ft	791 km 492 mi	58.8878°N 63.7098°W
3	Melville Island high point	Nunavut	Melville Island	762 m 2,500 ft	762 m 2,500 ft	717 km 445 mi	75.3694°N 115.0827°W
4	Mathiassen Mountain (Note: The summit of Mathiassen Mountain is the highest point of Southampton Island.)	Nunavut	Southampton Island	625 m 2,051 ft	625 m 2,051 ft	627 km 390 mi	64.7403°N 83.1573°W
5	Mount Logan	Yukon	Saint Elias Mountains	5956 m 19,541 ft	5247 m 17,215 ft	623 km 387 mi	60.5671°N 140.4055°W
6	Angilaaq Mountain	Nunavut	Bylot Island	1944 m 6,378 ft	1944 m 6,378 ft	622 km 387 mi	73.2298°N 78.6230°W
7	Mount Odin	Nunavut	Baffin Island	2143 m 7,031 ft	2143 m 7,031 ft	586 km 364 mi	66.5468°N 65.4289°W
8	Mount Waddington	British Columbia	Coast Mountains	4019 m 13,186 ft	3289 m 10,791 ft	562 km 349 mi	51.3737°N 125.2636°W
9	Melville Hills high point	Northwest Territories	Melville Hills	876 m 2,875 ft	500 m 1,640 ft	551 km 342 mi	69.2425°N 121.5391°W
10	Keele Peak	Yukon	Mackenzie Mountains	2952 m 9,685 ft	2161 m 7,090 ft	543 km 337 mi	63.4314°N 130.3243°W
11	Mealy Mountains high point (Note: Mealy Mountains high point is the easternmost 1000-metre (3281-foot) summit of Canada.)	Newfoundland and Labrador	Mealy Mountains	1190 m 3,904 ft	832 m 2,728 ft	519 km 323 mi	53.6465°N 58.5536°W
12	The Cabox (Note: The summit of The Cabox is the highest point of the island of Newfoundland.) (Note: The Cabox is the easternmost summit of its elevation in Canada.)	Newfoundland and Labrador	Island of Newfoundland	812 m 2,664 ft	812 m 2,664 ft	501 km 311 mi	48.8331°N 58.4843°W
13	Mont Yapeitso (Note: The summit of Mont Yapeitso is the highest point of the Monts Otish.)	Quebec	Monts Otish	1135 m 3,725 ft	500 m 1,640 ft	467 km 290 mi	52.3223°N 70.4451°W
14	Mount Robson	British Columbia	Canadian Rockies	3959 m 12,989 ft	2829 m 9,281 ft	460 km 286 mi	53.1105°N 119.1566°W
15	Ulysses Mountain (Mount Ulysses)	British Columbia	Muskwa Ranges	3024 m 9,921 ft	2294 m 7,526 ft	436 km 271 mi	57.3464°N 124.0928°W
16	Mont Jacques-Cartier (Note: The summit of Mont Jacques-Cartier is the highest point of the Canadian Appalachians.) (Note: Mont Jacques-Cartier is the southernmost summit of its elevation in Canada.)	Quebec	Chic-Choc Mountains	1268 m 4,160 ft	1093 m 3,585 ft	406 km 252 mi	48.9879°N 65.9483°W
17	Victoria Island high point	Nunavut	Victoria Island	655 m 2,149 ft	655 m 2,149 ft	375 km 233 mi	71.8528°N 112.6073°W
18	Kisimngiuqtuq Peak	Nunavut	Baffin Island	1905 m 6,250 ft	1605 m 5,266 ft	362 km 225 mi	70.7993°N 71.6502°W
19	Beitstad Peak	Nunavut	Ellesmere Island	2347 m 7,700 ft	2044 m 6,706 ft	354 km 220 mi	78.8007°N 79.5292°W
20	Mount Ratz	British Columbia	Coast Mountains	3090 m 10,138 ft	2430 m 7,972 ft	311 km 193.4 mi	57.3930°N 132.3031°W
21	Outlook Peak	Nunavut	Axel Heiberg Island	2210 m 7,251 ft	2210 m 7,251 ft	268 km 166.3 mi	79.7397°N 91.4061°W
22	Devon Ice Cap high point	Nunavut	Devon Island	1920 m 6,300 ft	1920 m 6,300 ft	265 km 164.6 mi	75.3429°N 82.6186°W
23	Manuel Peak (Note: The summit of Manuel Peak is the highest point of the Richardson Mountains.)	Yukon	Richardson Mountains	1722 m 5,650 ft	1292 m 4,239 ft	260 km 161.6 mi	67.9833°N 136.5833°W
24	Howson Peak	British Columbia	Coast Mountains	2759 m 9,052 ft	1829 m 6,001 ft	254 km 158 mi	54.4185°N 127.7441°W
25	Fox Mountain (Note: The summit of Fox Mountain is the highest point of the Pelly Mountains.)	Yukon	Pelly Mountains	2404 m 7,887 ft	1444 m 4,738 ft	229 km 142.5 mi	61.9224°N 133.3677°W
26	Cap Mountain (Note: The summit of Cap Mountain is the highest point of the Franklin Mountains.)	Northwest Territories	Franklin Mountains	1577 m 5,175 ft	500 m 1,640 ft	228 km 141.5 mi	63.4063°N 123.2061°W
27	Mount Frank Rae (Note: The summit of Mount Frank Rae is the highest point of the Ogilvie Mountains.)	Yukon	Ogilvie Mountains	2362 m 7,750 ft	1367 m 4,486 ft	224 km 139.4 mi	64.4706°N 138.5553°W
28	Mount Nirvana	Northwest Territories	Mackenzie Mountains	2773 m 9,098 ft	1663 m 5,456 ft	220 km 136.8 mi	61.8752°N 127.6807°W
29	Durham Heights (Note: The summit of Durham Heights is the highest point of Banks Island.)	Nunavut	Banks Island	724 m 2,375 ft	724 m 2,375 ft	218 km 135.4 mi	71.1358°N 122.9531°W
30	Mont Raoul-Blanchard (Note: The summit of Mont Raoul-Blanchard is the highest point of the Laurentian Mountains.) (Note: Mont Raoul-Blanchard is the southernmost 1000-metre (3281-foot) summit of Canada.)	Quebec	Laurentian Mountains	1175 m 3,855 ft	790 m 2,592 ft	206 km 128.2 mi	47.3100°N 70.8312°W
31	Mount Fairweather (Fairweather Mountain)	Alaska; British Columbia	Saint Elias Mountains	4671 m 15,325 ft	3961 m 12,995 ft	200 km 124.4 mi	58.9064°N 137.5265°W
32	Mount Macdonald	Yukon	Mackenzie Mountains	2760 m 9,055 ft	1555 m 5,102 ft	187.5 km 116.5 mi	64.7256°N 132.7781°W
33	Mont Veyrier (Note: The summit of Mont Veyrier is the highest point of the Monts Groulx.)	Quebec	Canadian Shield	1104 m 3,622 ft	500 m 1,640 ft	185.2 km 115.1 mi	51.5309°N 68.0763°W
34	Mount Moresby (Note: The summit of Mount Moresby is the highest point of Moresby Island.)	British Columbia	Moresby Island	1164 m 3,819 ft	1164 m 3,819 ft	184.3 km 114.5 mi	53.0191°N 132.0856°W
35	Grey Hunter Peak	Yukon	North Yukon Plateau	2214 m 7,264 ft	1519 m 4,984 ft	178.7 km 111 mi	63.1357°N 135.6359°W
36	Mount Columbia	Alberta; British Columbia	Canadian Rockies	3741 m 12,274 ft	2371 m 7,779 ft	158 km 98.2 mi	52.1473°N 117.4416°W
37	Skihist Mountain	British Columbia	Coast Mountains	2968 m 9,738 ft	2458 m 8,064 ft	157.1 km 97.6 mi	50.1878°N 121.9032°W
38	White Hill (Note: The summit of White Hill is the highest point of Cape Breton Island and the Canadian Province of Nova Scotia.) (Note: White Hill is the southernmost 500-metre (1640-foot) summit of Canada.)	Nova Scotia	Cape Breton Island	535 m 1,755 ft	535 m 1,755 ft	151.6 km 94.2 mi	46.7022°N 60.5989°W
39	Mount Crysdale	British Columbia	Misinchinka Ranges	2429 m 7,969 ft	1554 m 5,098 ft	147.3 km 91.5 mi	55.9383°N 123.4210°W
40	Qiajivik Mountain	Nunavut	Baffin Island	1905 m 6,250 ft	1729 m 5,673 ft	143.8 km 89.3 mi	72.1809°N 75.9090°W
41	Mount Assiniboine	Alberta; British Columbia	Canadian Rockies	3616 m 11,864 ft	2082 m 6,831 ft	141.8 km 88.1 mi	50.8696°N 115.6509°W
42	McBeth-Inugsuin Peak (Peak 39-18)	Nunavut	Baffin Island	1721 m 5,646 ft	1564 m 5,131 ft	138.5 km 86.1 mi	69.6524°N 69.3059°W
43	Simpson Peak	British Columbia	Stikine Plateau	2170 m 7,119 ft	985 m 3,232 ft	136.6 km 84.9 mi	59.7234°N 131.4480°W
44	Devils Paw (Note: The summit of Devils Paw is the highest point of the Juneau Icefield.)	Alaska; British Columbia	Coast Mountains	2593 m 8,507 ft	1703 m 5,587 ft	136.3 km 84.7 mi	58.7289°N 133.8402°W
45	Mount Carleton (Note: The summit of Mount Carleton is the highest point of the Canadian Province of New Brunswick.)	New Brunswick	Notre Dame Mountains	820 m 2,690 ft	625 m 2,051 ft	134.7 km 83.7 mi	47.3780°N 66.8761°W
46	Golden Hinde	British Columbia	Vancouver Island	2197 m 7,208 ft	2197 m 7,208 ft	134.3 km 83.4 mi	49.6627°N 125.7470°W
47	Mount Jancowski	British Columbia	Coast Mountains	2729 m 8,953 ft	2079 m 6,821 ft	124 km 77.1 mi	56.3372°N 129.9817°W
48	Shedin Peak (Note: The summit of Shedin Peak is the highest point of the Skeena Mountains.)	British Columbia	Skeena Mountains	2588 m 8,491 ft	1798 m 5,899 ft	118.2 km 73.4 mi	55.9392°N 127.4799°W
49	Man O'War Peak (Note: The summit of Man O'War Peak is the highest point of the Kiglapait Mountains.)	Newfoundland and Labrador	Kiglapait Mountains	1050 m 3,445 ft	974 m 3,196 ft	103.9 km 64.6 mi	56.9686°N 61.6692°W
50	Thudaka Mountain	British Columbia	Cassiar Mountains	2748 m 9,016 ft	1739 m 5,705 ft	103.5 km 64.3 mi	57.9272°N 126.8485°W

== Gallery ==
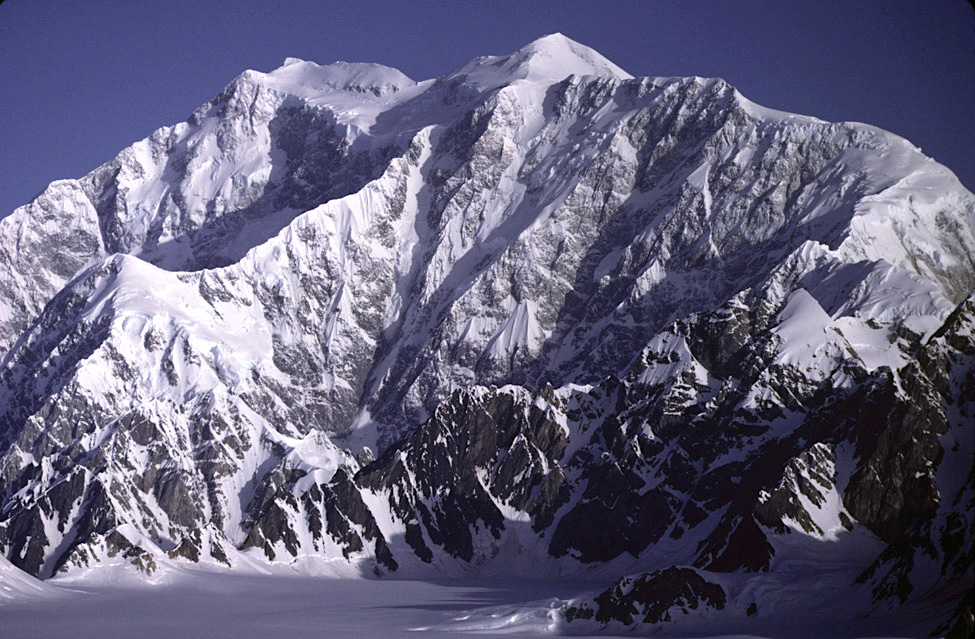
Mount Logan in Yukon is the highest summit of Canada.

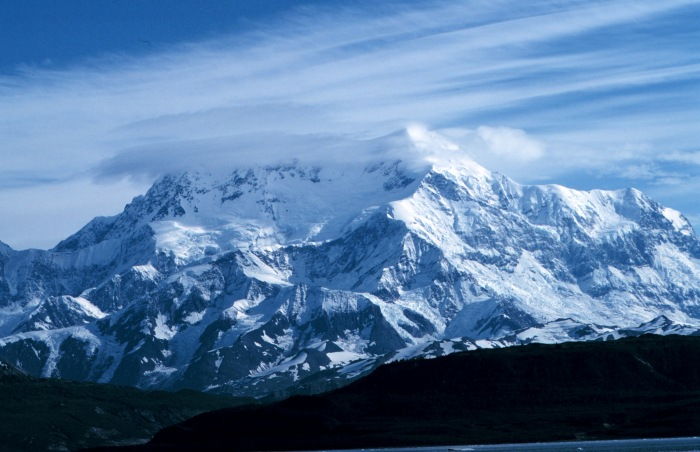
Mount Saint Elias is the second highest summit of both Canada and the United States.

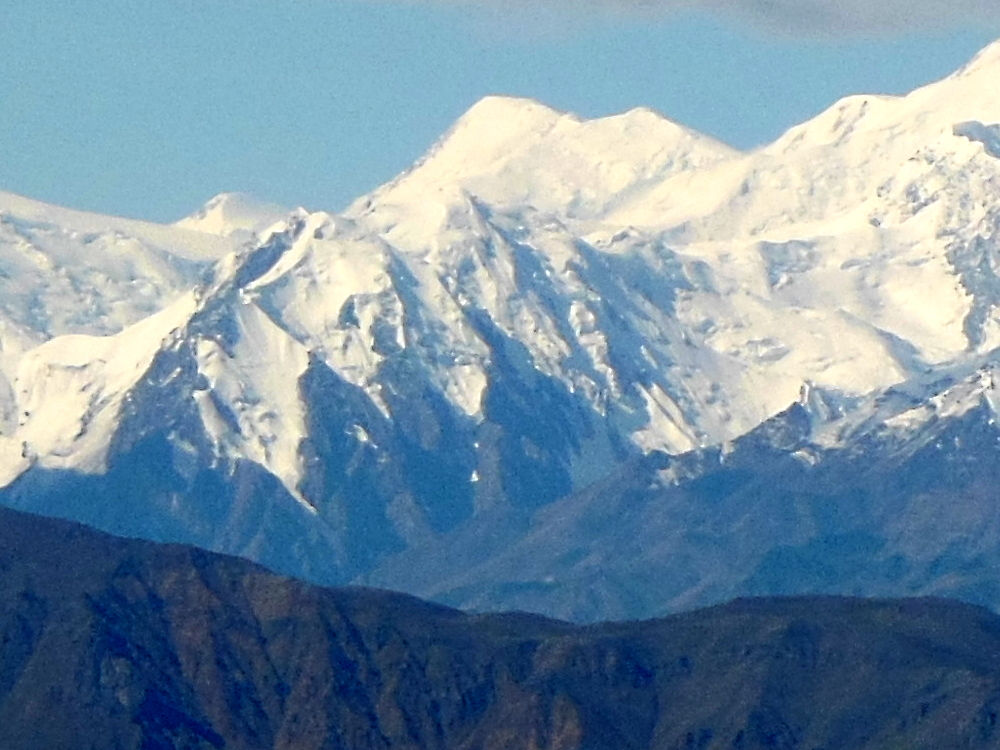
Mount Lucania in Yukon is the highest summit of the northern Saint Elias Mountains.

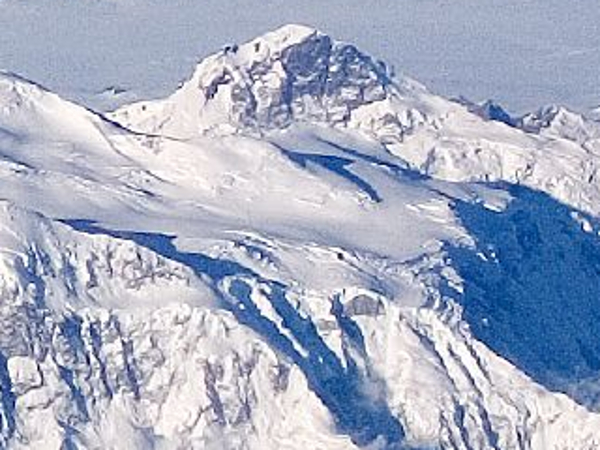
King Peak in Yukon is the fourth highest summit of Canada.

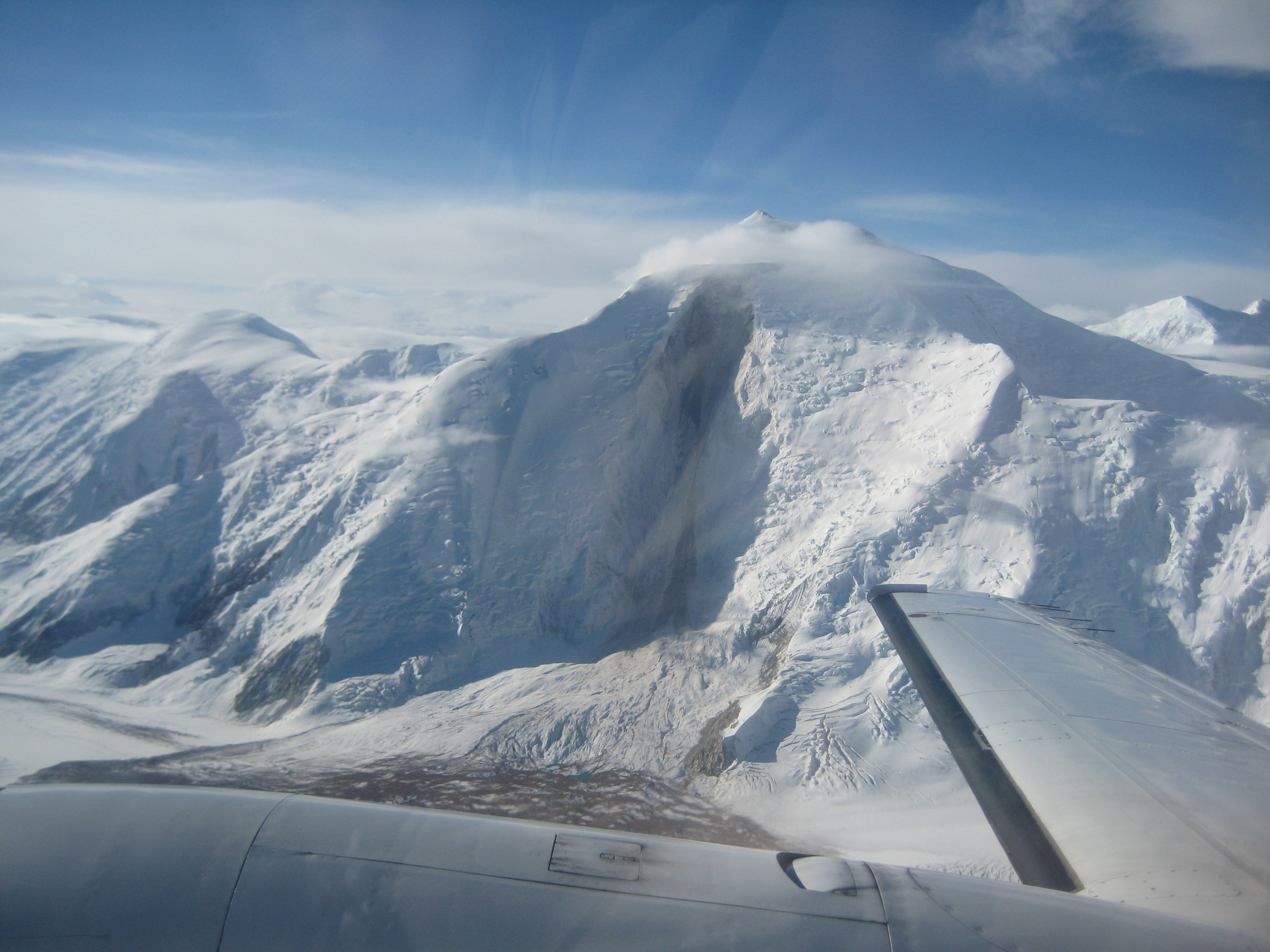
Mount Steele in Yukon is the fifth highest summit of Canada.

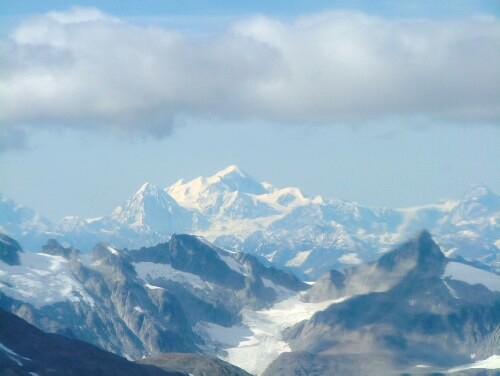
Mount Fairweather on the Alaska border is the highest summit of British Columbia.

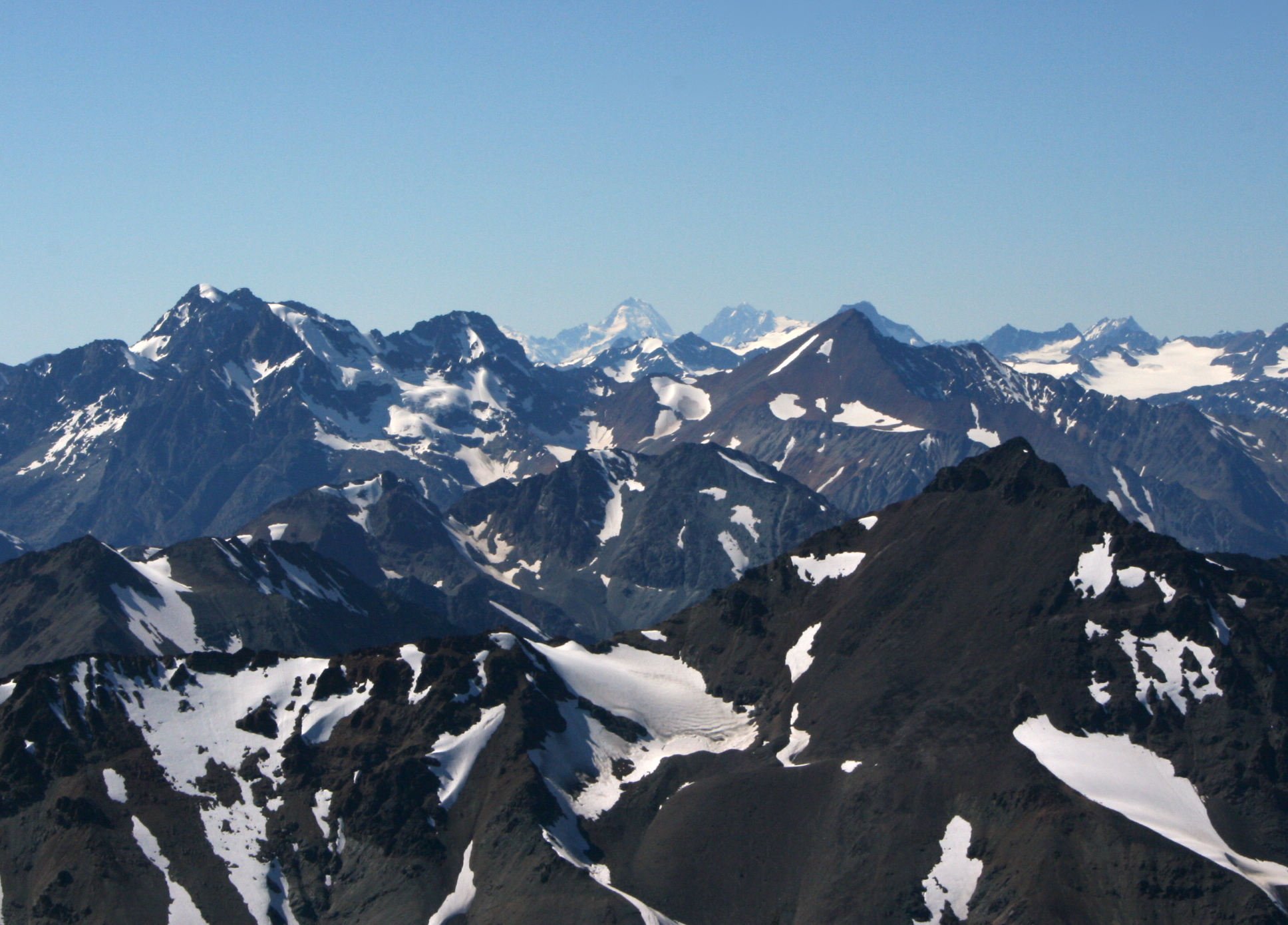
Mount Waddington is the highest summit of the Coast Mountains of British Columbia.

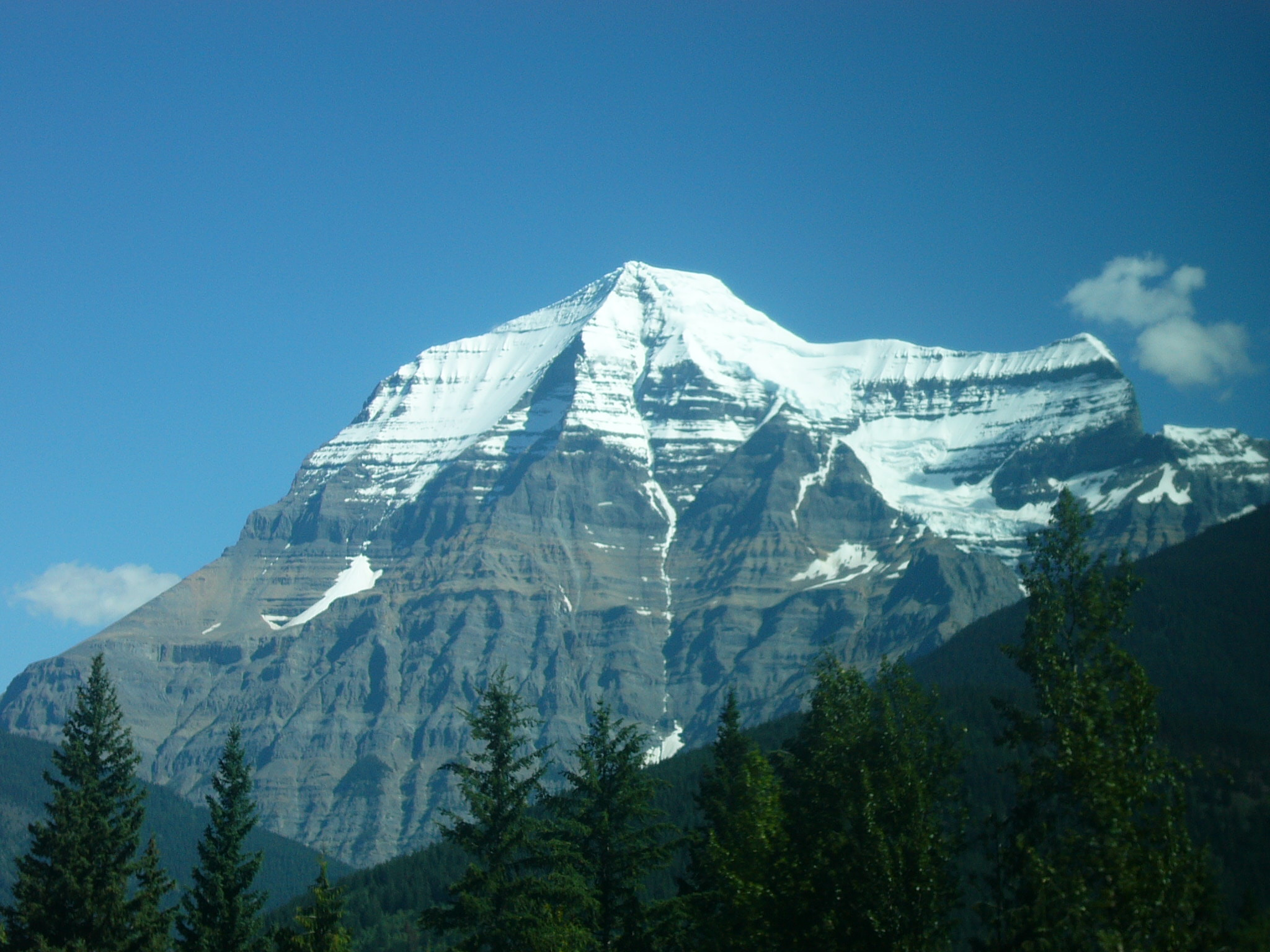
Mount Robson in British Columbia is the highest summit of the Canadian Rockies.

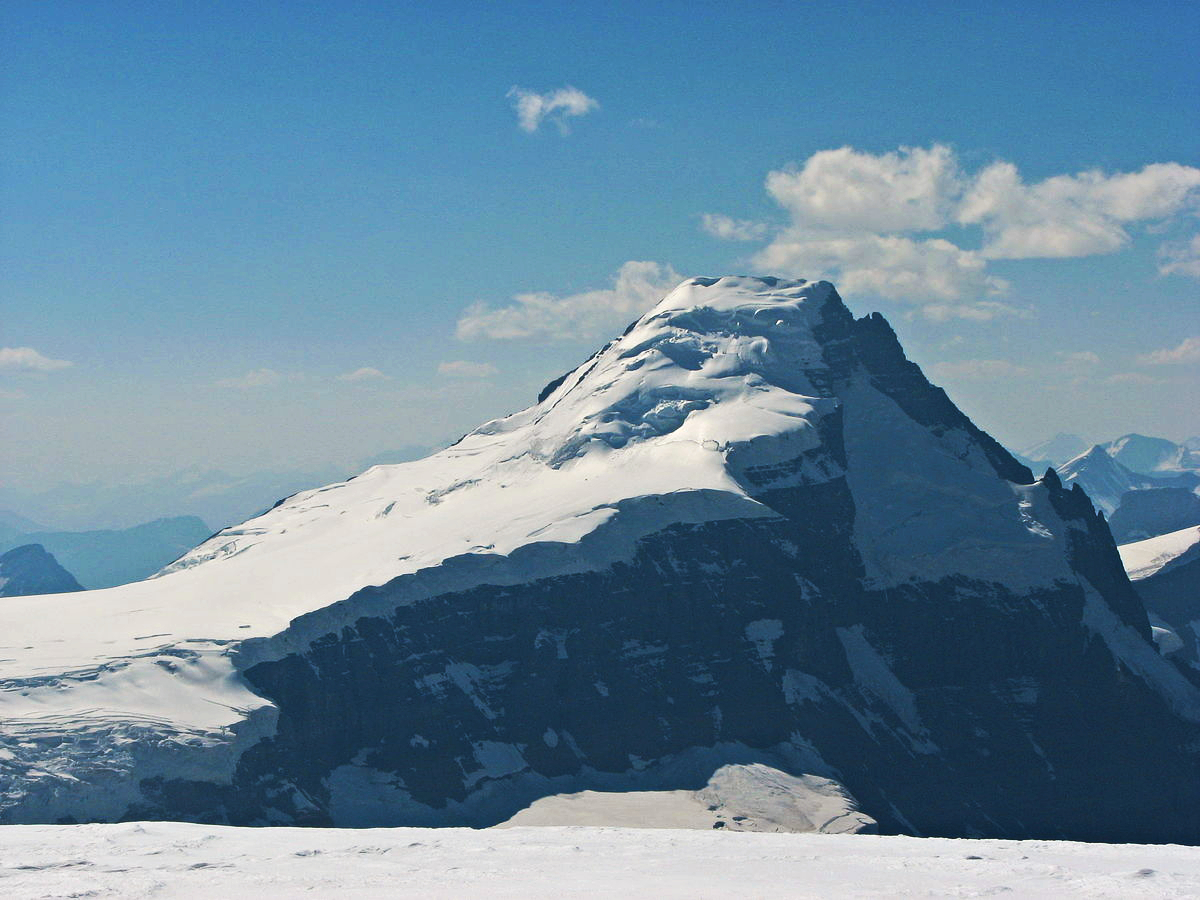
Mount Columbia on the British Columbia border is the highest summit of Alberta.

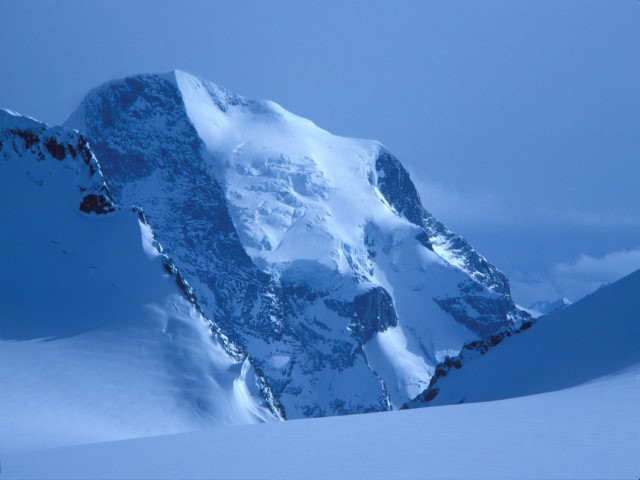
Mount Sir Sandford is the highest summit of the Sir Sandford Range of British Columbia.

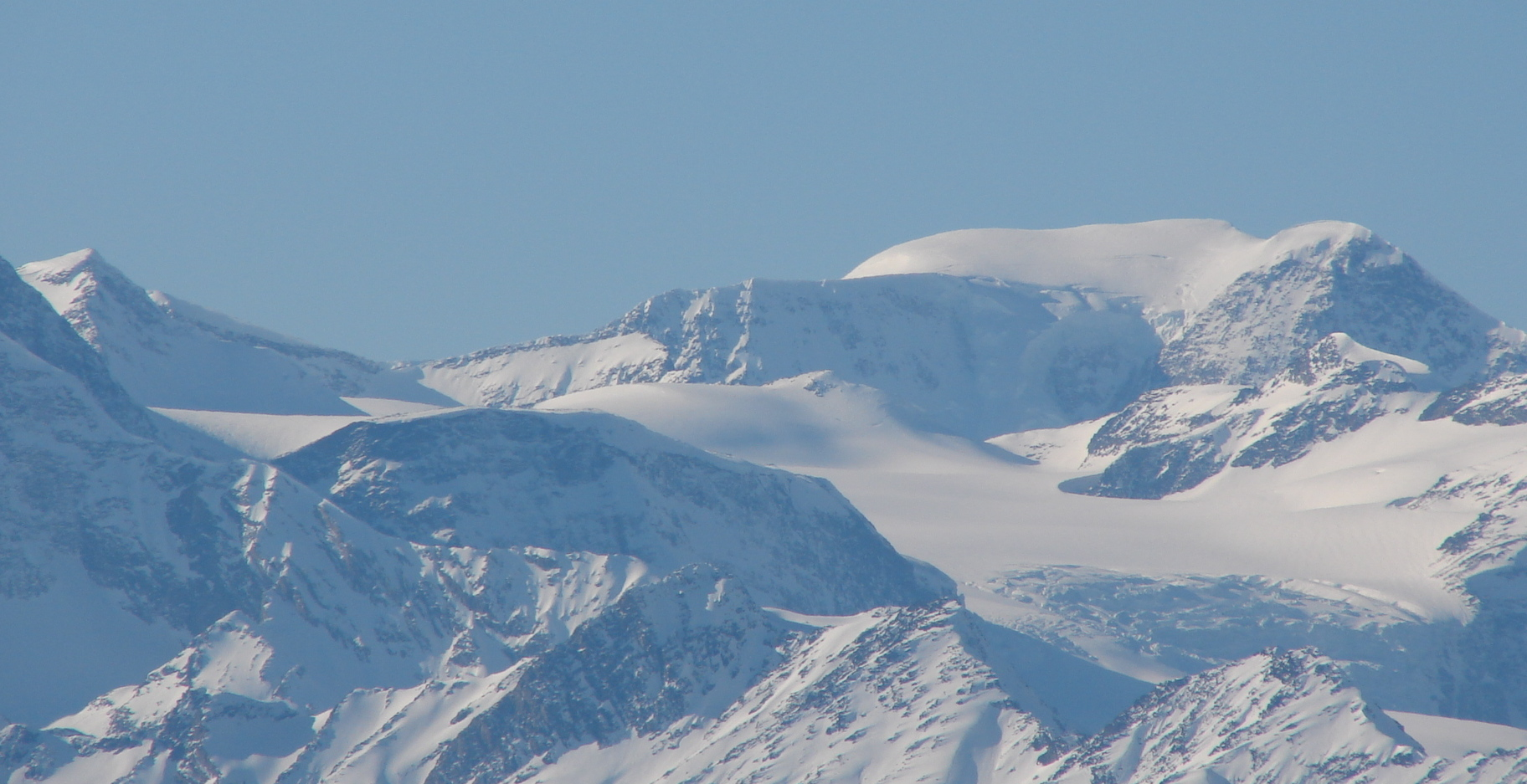
Mount Sir Wilfrid Laurier is the highest summit of the Cariboo Mountains of British Columbia.

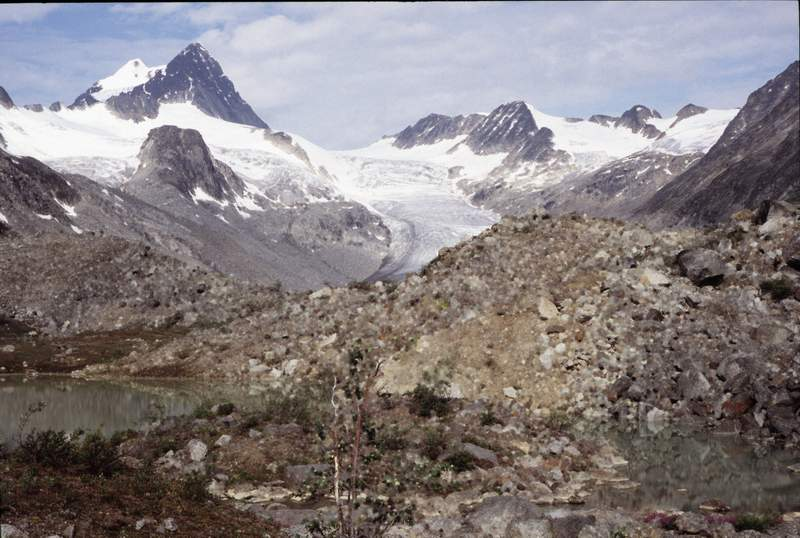
Keele Peak is the highest summit of the Mackenzie Mountains of Yukon.

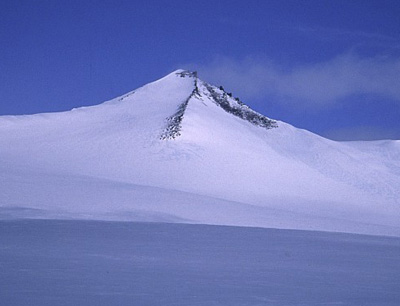
Barbeau Peak is the highest summit of Ellesmere Island and Nunavut.

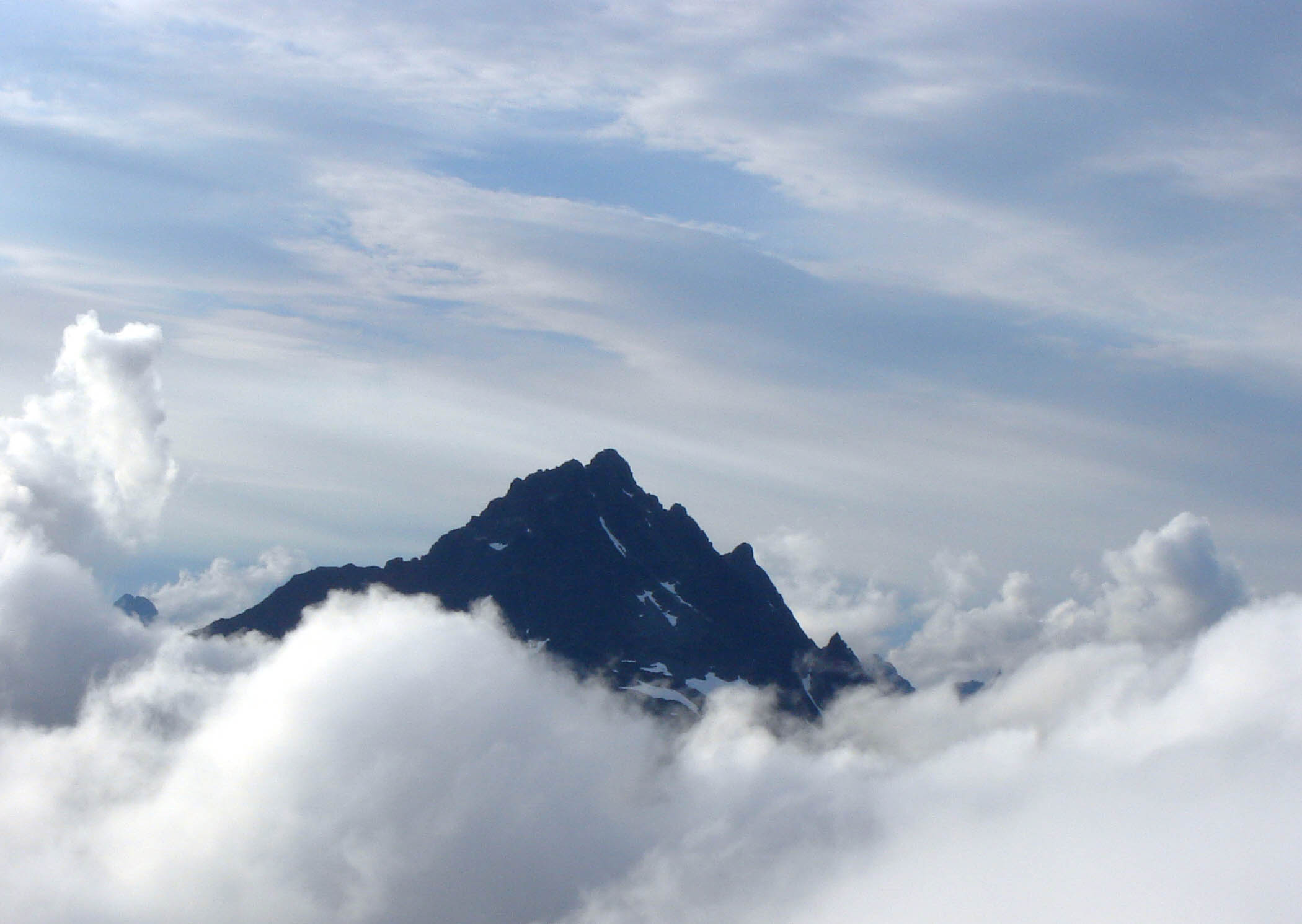
The Golden Hinde is the highest summit of Vancouver Island.

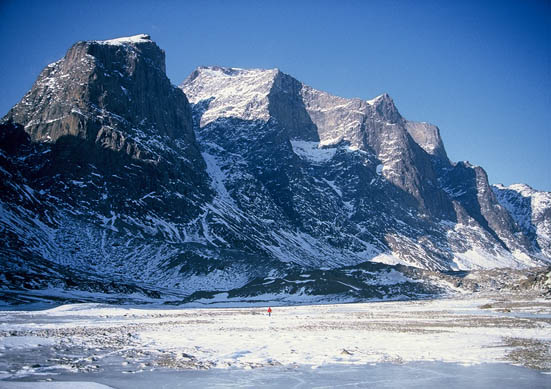
Mount Odin is the highest summit of Baffin Island.

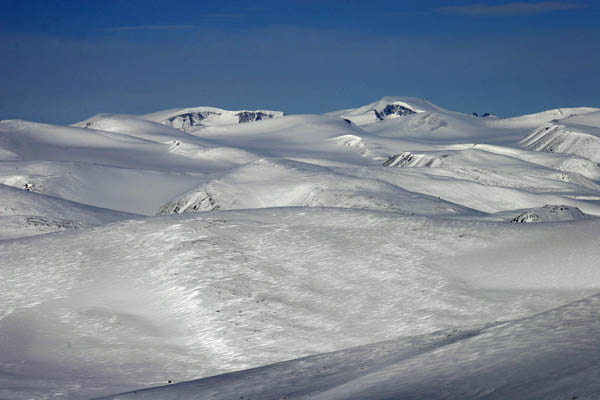
Qiajivik Mountain is the highest summit of northern Baffin Island.

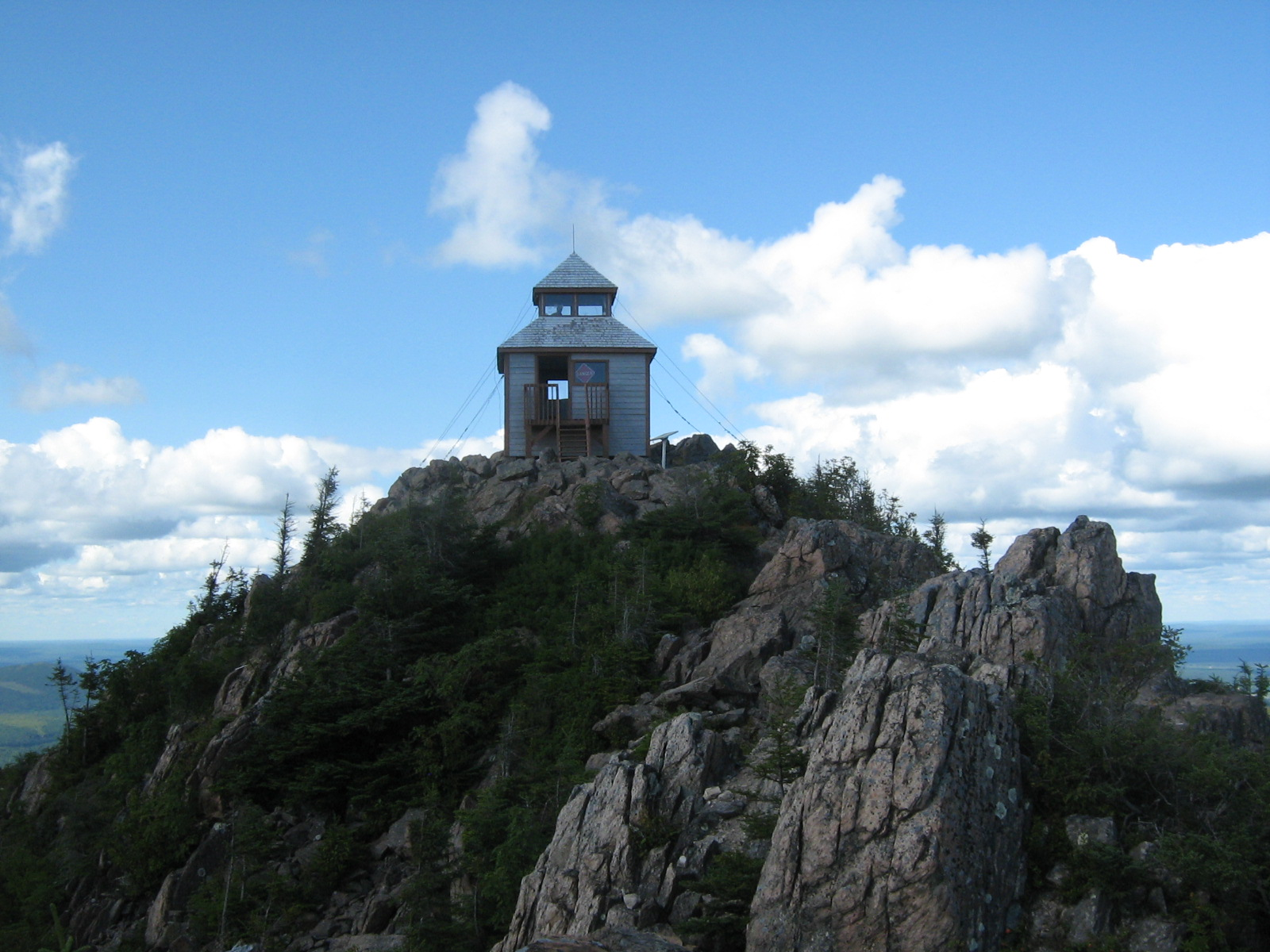
Mount Carleton is the highest summit of New Brunswick.

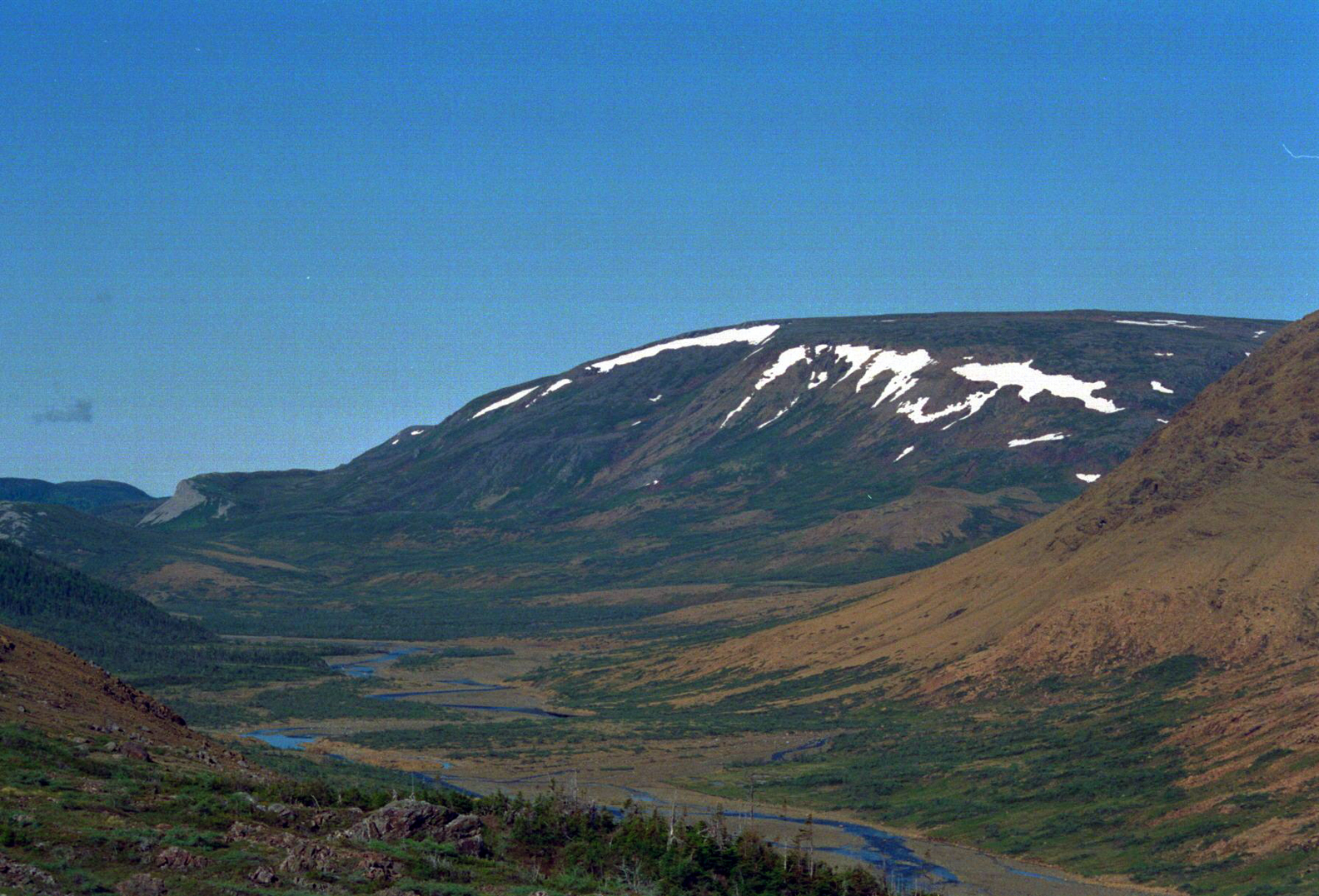
The Cabox is the highest summit of Newfoundland.

== See also ==
- List of mountain peaks of North America
  - List of mountain peaks of Greenland
  - List of mountain peaks of Canada
  - List of mountain peaks of the Rocky Mountains
  - List of mountain peaks of the United States
  - List of mountain peaks of México
  - List of mountain peaks of Central America
  - List of mountain peaks of the Caribbean
- Canada
  - Geography of Canada
    - Category:Mountains of Canada
    - commons:Category:Mountains of Canada
- Physical geography
  - Topography
    - Topographic elevation
    - Topographic prominence
    - Topographic isolation
