= Mount Cook (Saint Elias Mountains) =

Mountain on Canada-United States border

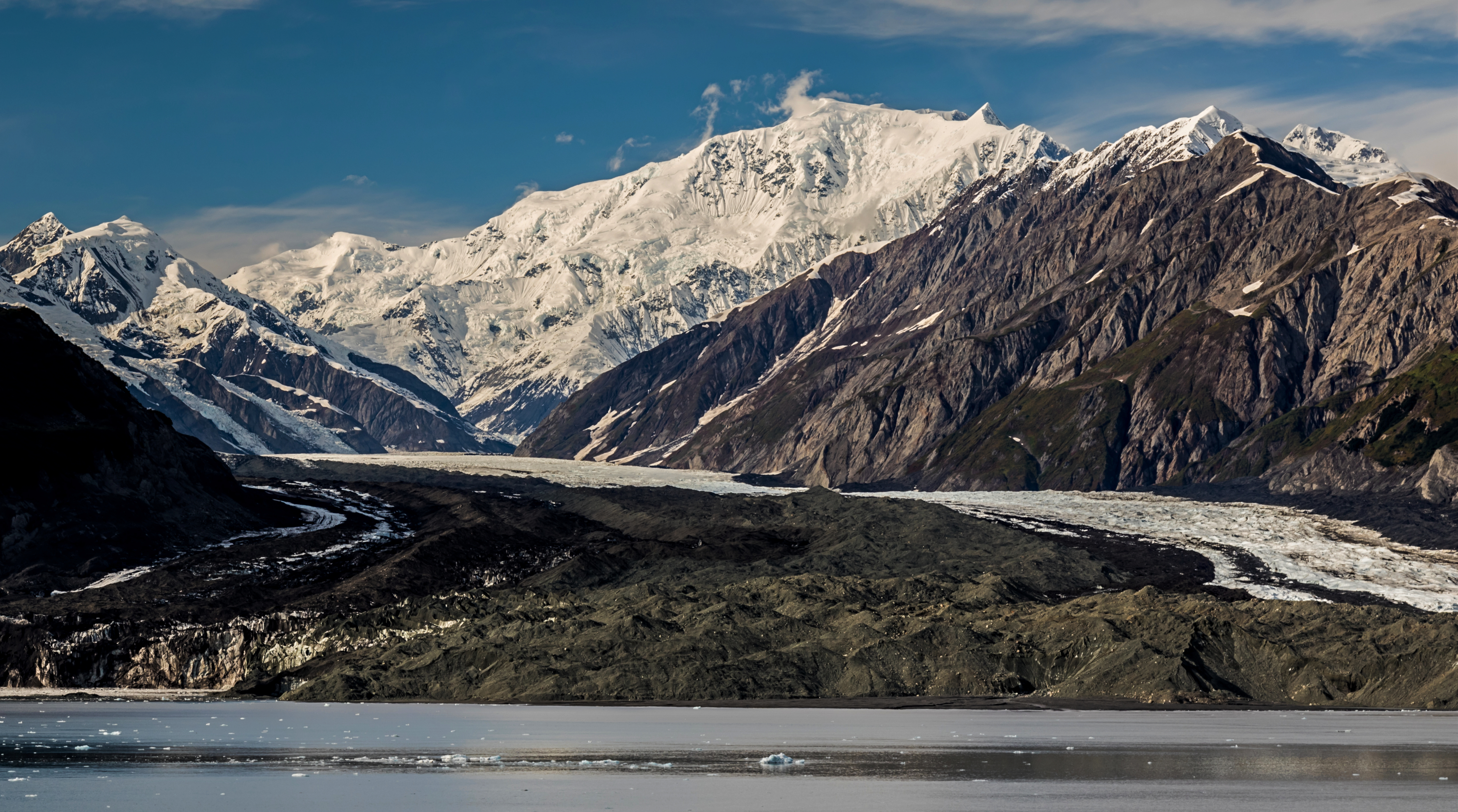

Highest point
- Elevation: 13,766 ft (4,196 m)
- Prominence: 7,713 ft (2,351 m)
- Listing: North America highest peaks 79th; North America prominent peak 48th; Canada highest major peaks 16th; US highest major peaks 61st
- Coordinates: 60°10′55″N 139°58′51″W

Geography
- Location within Alaska Location within Yukon
- Location: Yukon, Canada—Yakutat City and Borough, Alaska, U.S.
- Parent range: Saint Elias Mountains
- Topo map: NTS 115B4

Climbing
- First ascent: 1953 by T Kelley, R McGowan, T Miller, F Mohling

Mount Cook (or Boundary Peak 182) is a high peak on the Yukon Territory-Alaska border, in the Saint Elias Mountains of North America. It is approximately 15 mi (24 km) southwest of Mount Vancouver and 35 mi (56 km) miles east-southeast of Mount Saint Elias. It forms one of the corners of the jagged border, which is defined to run in straight lines between the major peaks. The same border also separates Kluane National Park in the Yukon Territory from Wrangell-St. Elias National Park and Preserve in Alaska.

Like many peaks of the Saint Elias Mountains, Mount Cook is a massive peak, with a large rise above local terrain. For example, the southwest face drops 10,000 feet (3,000 m) to the Marvine Glacier in approximately 4 miles (6.4 km). It is also quite close to tidewater: Disenchantment Bay is less than 18 miles (29 km) from the summit.

Mount Cook was first climbed in 1953. It is not often climbed due to its remoteness, the size of the mountain, the typically poor weather (due to its proximity to the ocean), and the fact that it is not one of the highest peaks of the range. In fact there are only four references to the peak in the complete index of the American Alpine Journal.

== Gallery ==
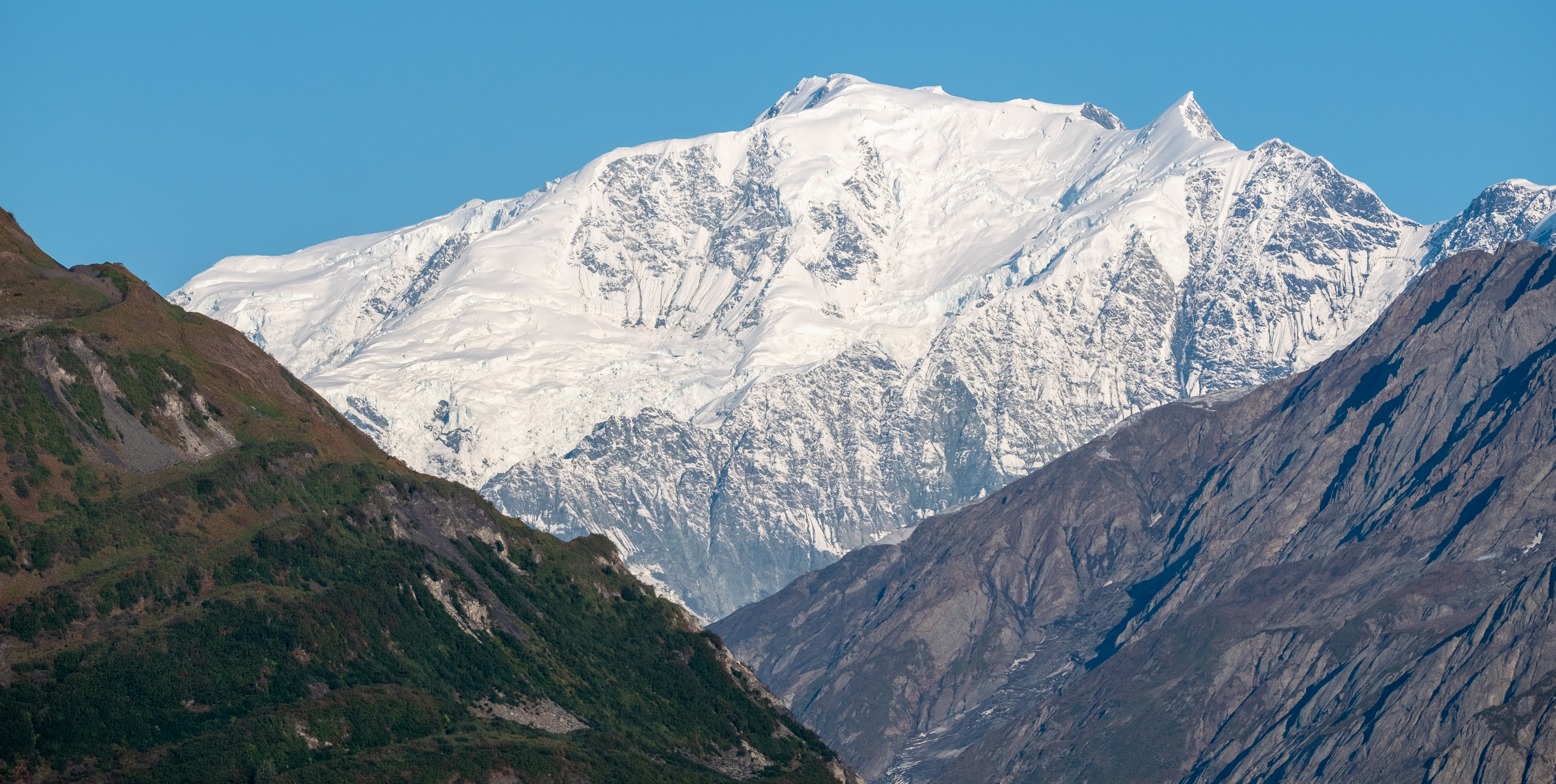
Southeast aspect

== See also ==
- List of mountain peaks of North America
  - List of mountain peaks of Canada
    - List of mountains of Yukon
  - List of mountain peaks of the United States
- List of Boundary Peaks of the Alaska-British Columbia/Yukon border

== Notes ==
1. This is according to bivouac.com, the Canadian Mountain Encyclopedia, quoting the Canadian NTS map. The USGS map has an elevation that is 6 feet lower.
2. According to bivouac.com, the NTS map shows the high point substantially north of the international border (much as with Mount Vancouver). The USGS shows the summit to be right on the border.
