= Mount Monashee =

Summit in British Columbia

- Location within British Columbia

Highest point
- Elevation: 3,274 m (10,741 ft)
- Prominence: 2,394 m (7,854 ft)
- Listing: Mountains of British Columbia; Canada most prominent 16th
- Coordinates: 52°23′7″N 118°56′24″W

Geography
- Location: British Columbia, Canada
- Parent range: Monashee Mountains

Climbing
- First ascent: 1952 by Sterling B. Hendricks, Arnold Wexler, Donald Hubbard

Mount Monashee is a summit in British Columbia. At an elevation of 3274 meters (10,741 feet), it is the highest point in the Monashee Mountains.

Mount Monashee was first summited by Arnold Wexler, Sterling Hendricks, and Donald Hubbard in 1952, during a trip through the range wherein they also summited Mount Hallam and Dominion Mountain for the first times, and found a new path up Mount Lempriere.

Mount Monashee is the type locality of a formerly recognized subspecies of American pika. The Monashees American pika was no longer recognized as a distinct subspecies in 2010 after studies in genetic markers, call dialects, and skull measurements done by David Hafner and Andrew Smith showed there was mingling of pika populations in British Columbia.

== See also ==
- Mountain peaks of Canada
- List of the most prominent summits of Canada
- List of mountain peaks of North America
