= Whitecap Mountain (British Columbia) =

Mountain in British Columbia, Canada

- Location within British Columbia Location within Canada
- Interactive map of Whitecap Mountain

Highest point
- Elevation: 2,918 m (9,573 ft)
- Prominence: 1,533 m (5,030 ft)
- Isolation: 71.44 km (44.39 mi)
- Listing: Highest major summits of Canada; Ultras of North America; Isolated major summits of Canada; Mountain peaks of Canada; Mountains of British Columbia
- Coordinates: 50°42′58″N 122°30′32″W

Geography
- Location: British Columbia, Canada
- District: Lillooet Land District
- Parent range: Coast Mountains; Bendor Range
- Topo map: NTS 92J10 Birkenhead Lake

Whitecap Mountain is a 2,918-metre (9,573-foot) summit in British Columbia, Canada.

== Description ==
Whitecap Mountain is the highest point in the Bendor Range which is a subrange of the Coast Mountains. The remote glaciated peak is located 50 kilometres (31 mi) north-northeast of Pemberton and 40 kilometres (25 mi) west of Lillooet. Precipitation runoff from this mountain's south slope drains to Anderson Lake via Connel Creek, the northwest slope drains to Carpenter Lake via Keary Creek, and the east slope drains to Seton Lake via Whitecap Creek. This is all within the Fraser River watershed. Whitecap Mountain is notable for its steep rise above local terrain as topographic relief is significant with the summit rising over 1,300 metres (4,265 ft) above the Connel Creek valley in 2.5 kilometres (1.6 mi). The mountain's local descriptive toponym was officially adopted on March 31, 1924, by the Geographical Names Board of Canada.

== Climate ==
Based on the Köppen climate classification, Whitecap Mountain is located in a tundra climate zone. Most weather fronts originate in the Pacific Ocean, and travel east toward the Coast Mountains where they are forced upward by the range (orographic lift), causing them to drop their moisture in the form of rain or snowfall. As a result, the Coast Mountains experience high precipitation, especially during the winter months in the form of snowfall. Winter temperatures can drop below −20 °C with wind chill factors below −30 °C. This climate supports three unnamed glaciers on the north, northwest, and east slopes of the mountain.

== See also ==
- Geography of British Columbia
- Geology of British Columbia
