= Keele Peak =

Mountain in Yukon, Canada

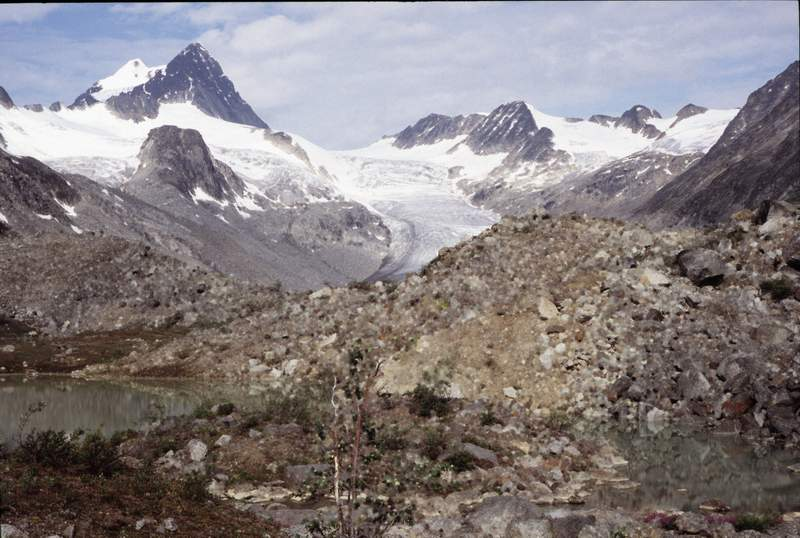
- Keele Peak, 2005

Highest point
- Elevation: 2,952 m (9,685 ft)
- Prominence: 2,157 m (7,077 ft)
- Listing: North America prominent peak 72nd; North America isolated peaks 27th; Canada highest major peaks 72nd; Canada most prominent peaks 28th; Canada most isolated peaks 10th
- Coordinates: 63°25′52″N 130°19′25″W

Geography
- Location within Yukon
- Country: Canada
- Territory: Yukon
- Parent range: Mackenzie Mountains
- Topo map: NTS 105O8 Keele Peak

Keele Peak, in Yukon, Canada is the highest peak in the Mackenzie Mountains at 2,952 metres (9,685 ft). With a prominence measure of 2,157 m (7,077 ft) it is one of Canada's most prominent peaks. It is located about 25 km from the Canol Road not far from the Northwest Territories border.

The peak was named for Joseph Keele, an explorer and geologist who had moved to Canada from his native Ireland.

== See also ==
- Mountain peaks of Canada
  - List of mountains of Yukon
- Mountain peaks of North America
- Most isolated mountain peaks of Canada
- List of Ultras of North America
- List of the most prominent summits of North America
