= Mount Ulysses =

Mountain in British Columbia, Canada

- Location within British Columbia

Highest point
- Elevation: 3,024 m (9,921 ft)
- Prominence: 2,289 m (7,510 ft)
- Listing: Mountains of British Columbia; North America prominent peak 54th; North America isolated peaks 42nd; Canada highest major peaks 67th; Canada prominent peaks 21st; Canada most isolated peaks 15th
- Coordinates: 57°20′47″N 124°5′34″W

Geography
- Country: Canada
- Province: British Columbia
- District: Peace River Land District
- Parent range: Muskwa Ranges
- Topo map: NTS 94F8 Cyclops Peak

Climbing
- First ascent: August 16, 1961

Mount Ulysses, is the highest mountain in the Muskwa Ranges of the Northern Canadian Rockies in British Columbia. It and neighbouring peaks are part of a group of names drawing on the epic poem The Odyssey, in which here Ulysses wanders for 10 years before being able to return home to Ithaca.

Located north of the headwaters of the Akie River and to the south of Sikanni Chief Lake, its very high prominence of 2,289 m (7,510 ft) is relative to Grand Pacific Pass, with its parent peak being an unnamed summit in the Fairweather Range, near Mount Fairweather.

It was first climbed in 1961.

== See also ==
- List of mountains in the Canadian Rockies
- List of ultras of North America
- List of the highest major summits of Canada
