= Kiglapait Mountains =

Coordinates: 57°06′00″N 61°34′57″W

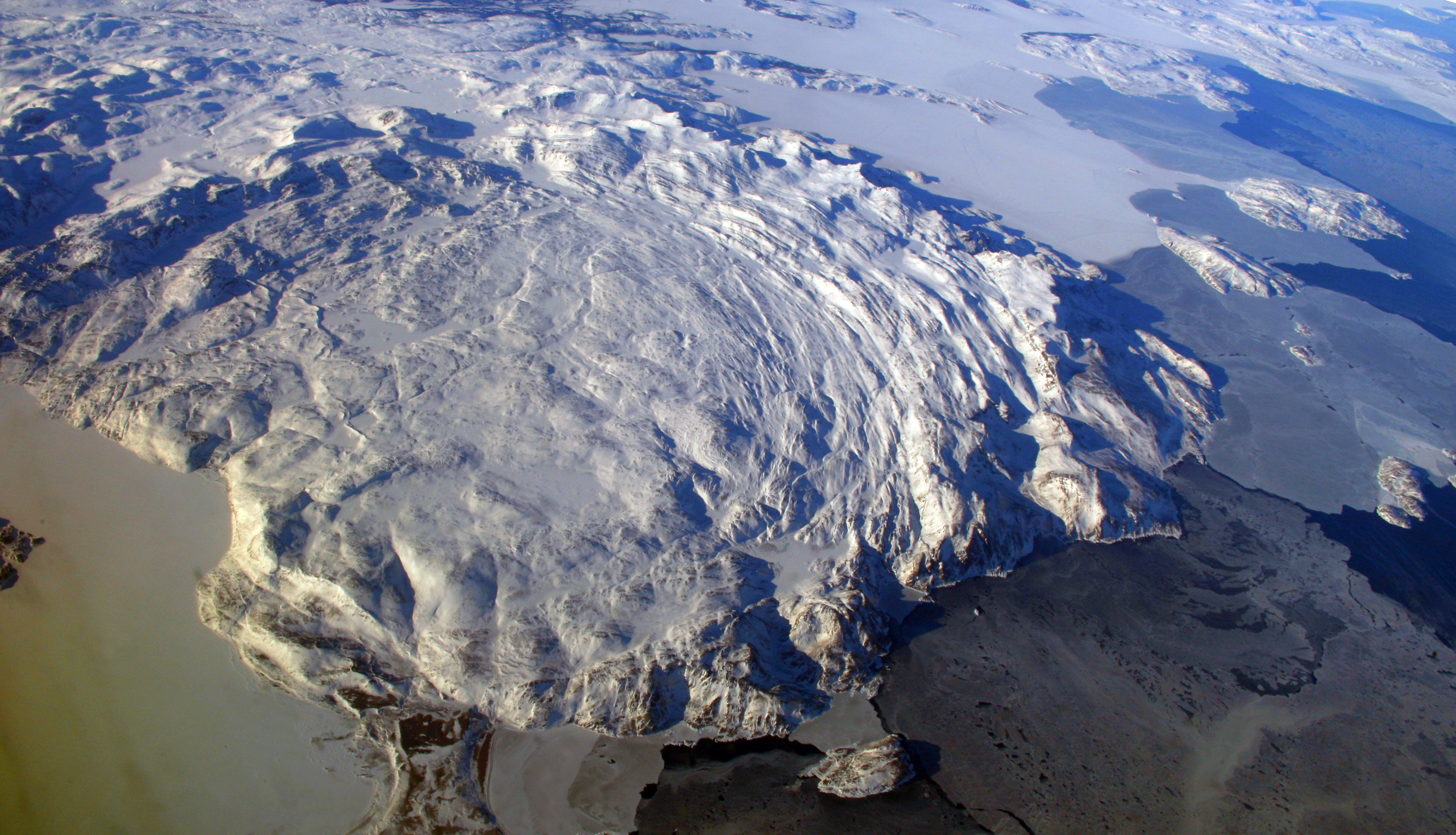
Kiglapait Mountains circular structure and Labrador coast

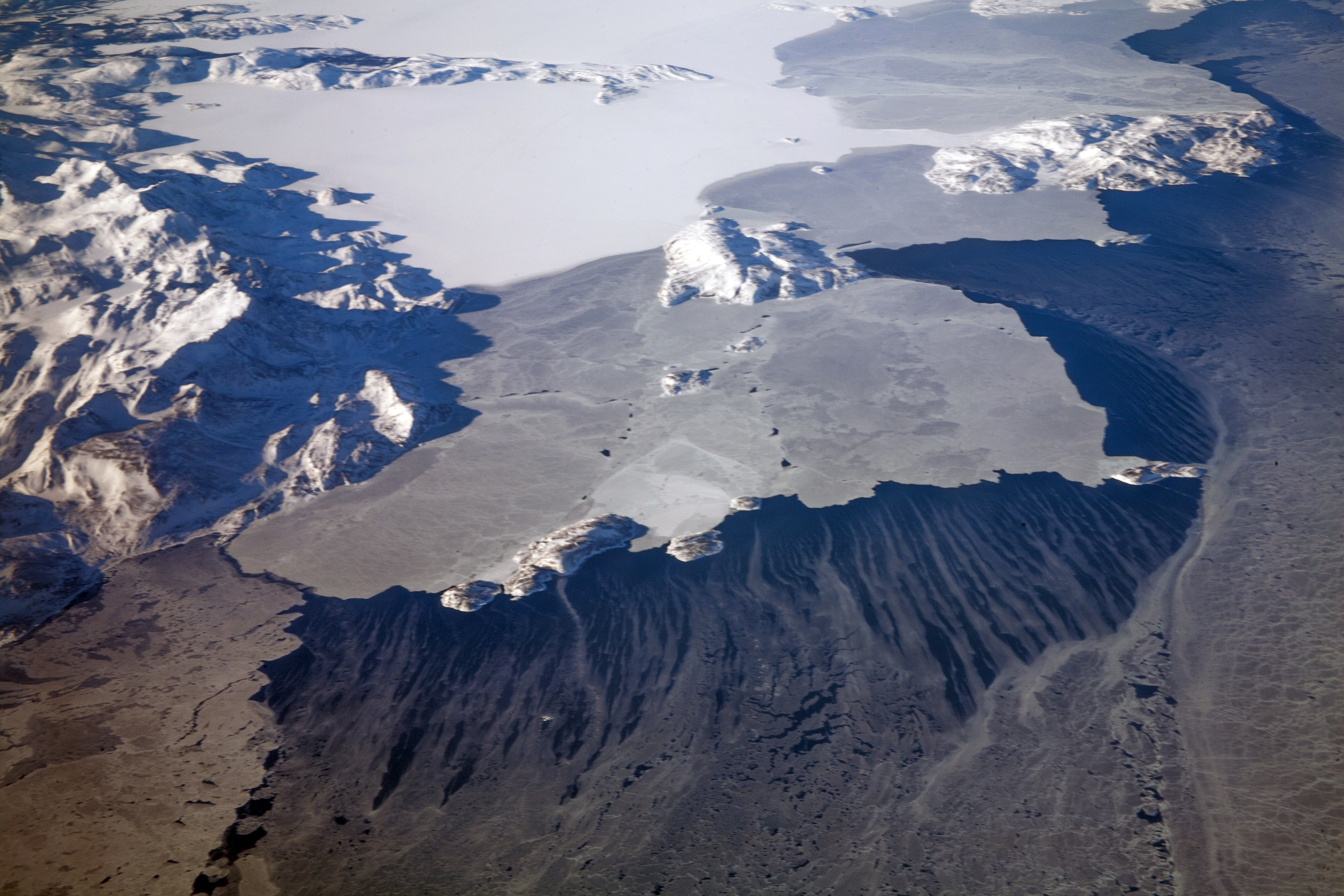
Kiglapait Mountains and offshore islands, at the Labrador coast. (Note that the sea appears in three different colors, form south (right) to north (left): white dry ice, wet ice in grey, and open waters with ice debris, in varied deep blue-brown, surrounding the islands.)

The Kiglapait Mountains lie north of Nain, in northern Labrador, south of the Torngat and Kaumajet Mountains. Not as high as those ranges, they still boast very rugged terrain and many peaks with high prominence values. The name means "dog-tooth."

Highest Peaks of the Kiglapait Mountains
Rank	Name	m	ft
1	Man O'War Peak	1050	3445
2	Peak 3400 (14E/2)	1036+	3400+
3	Peak 3300 (14E/1)	1006+	3300+
4	Peak 3300 (14E/2)	1006+	3300+
5	Peak 3200 (14E/1)	975+	3200
6	Peak 3100 (14E/1)	945+	3100+
7	Peak 3000#1 (14D/16)	914+	3000+
8	Aupalukitak Mountain	914+	3000+
9	Mount Thoresby	914+	3000+
10	Peak 3000#2 (14D/16)	914+	3000+
