= Bendor Range =

Subrange of the Pacific Ranges of the Coast Mountains

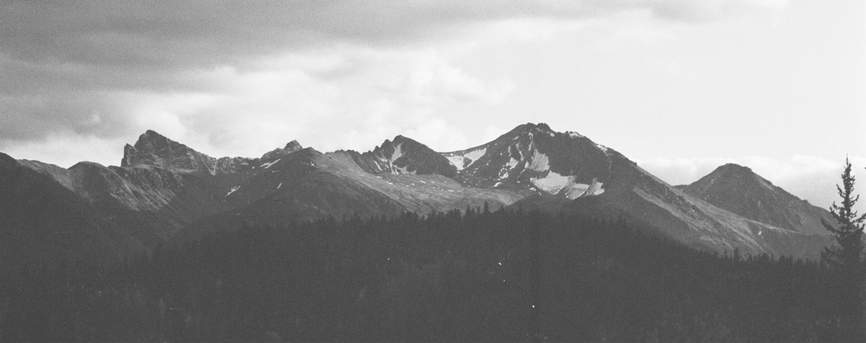
- Northwestern Bendor Range seen from Tyaughton Lake. Mount Truax at left.

Highest point
- Peak: Whitecap Mountain
- Elevation: 2,918 m (9,573 ft)
- Coordinates: 50°43′00″N 122°30′34″W

Dimensions
- Area: 728 km^{2} (281 mi^{2})

Geography
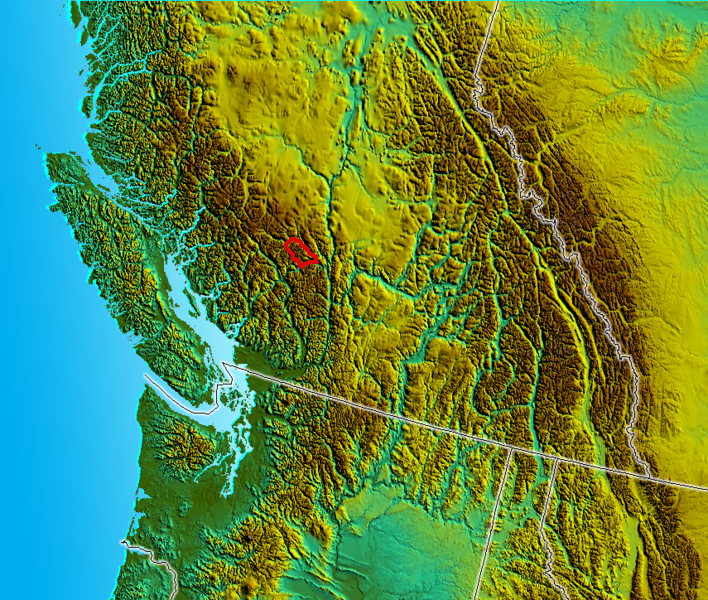
- Location of Bendor Range
- Country: Canada
- Province: British Columbia
- Parent range: Pacific Ranges

The Bendor Range is a small but once-famous subrange of the Pacific Ranges of the Coast Mountains, about It is approximately 7,000 square kilometres (2,700 mi^{2}) in area and about 40 km long (NW to SE) and about 18 km at its widest. It lies between Anderson Lake on the southeast and the Carpenter Lake Reservoir or the Bridge River Power Project on the north, with the gold-rich valley of Cadwallader Creek on its southwest.

The range's western flank is the site of a series of now-semi-abandoned mining towns. One of these, Bralorne, is among the deepest mines in Canada and in its heyday was the third-richest gold mine in the world; it has waned from a peak population of 8,000 to less than 300 today. Its shafts plunge a mile beneath sea level under the range, starting at 3500' above. The name "Bendor" is believed by some locally to be a Gaelic-French hybrid - ben d'or - mountain of gold (note Welsh: Pen d'awr means the same thing) - and while it does mean that, more or less, the name was conferred in honour of Bend Or, a famous racehorse of the 1890s.

The range has only a few small icefields, but a number of extremely high and (for climbers) difficult peaks. The highest is Whitecap Mountain 2,918 m (9,573 ft), which is visible from the Lillooet end of Seton Lake but, as it is located near the heart of the range, invisible from the towns and lakes around its perimeter. At the northwest of the range, but mostly invisible from the towns below because of the terrain of its flanks, is Mount Truax 2,870 m (9,420 ft). East of it are Mount Williams 2,775 m (9,104 ft) and Mount Bobb 2,821 m (9,255 ft).

Note: some classification systems assign the Bendor to the Chilcotin Ranges subgrouping of the Pacific Ranges, but this is incorrect as it is on the south side of the Bridge River, which is the limit of the Chilcotin Ranges.
