= Alsek Peak =

Mountain in Yukon, Canada

- Location within Yukon Location within Canada

Highest point
- Elevation: 2,716 m (8,911 ft)
- Prominence: 2,045 m (6,709 ft)
- Listing: Mountains of Yukon
- Coordinates: 60°1′57″N 137°35′29″W

Geography
- Location: Yukon, Canada
- Parent range: Saint Elias Mountains
- Topo map: NTS 115A4 Bates River

Alsek Peak is a mountain summit located in the Saint Elias Mountains of Yukon, Canada.
