= Mount Vancouver =

Mountain in Canada and USA

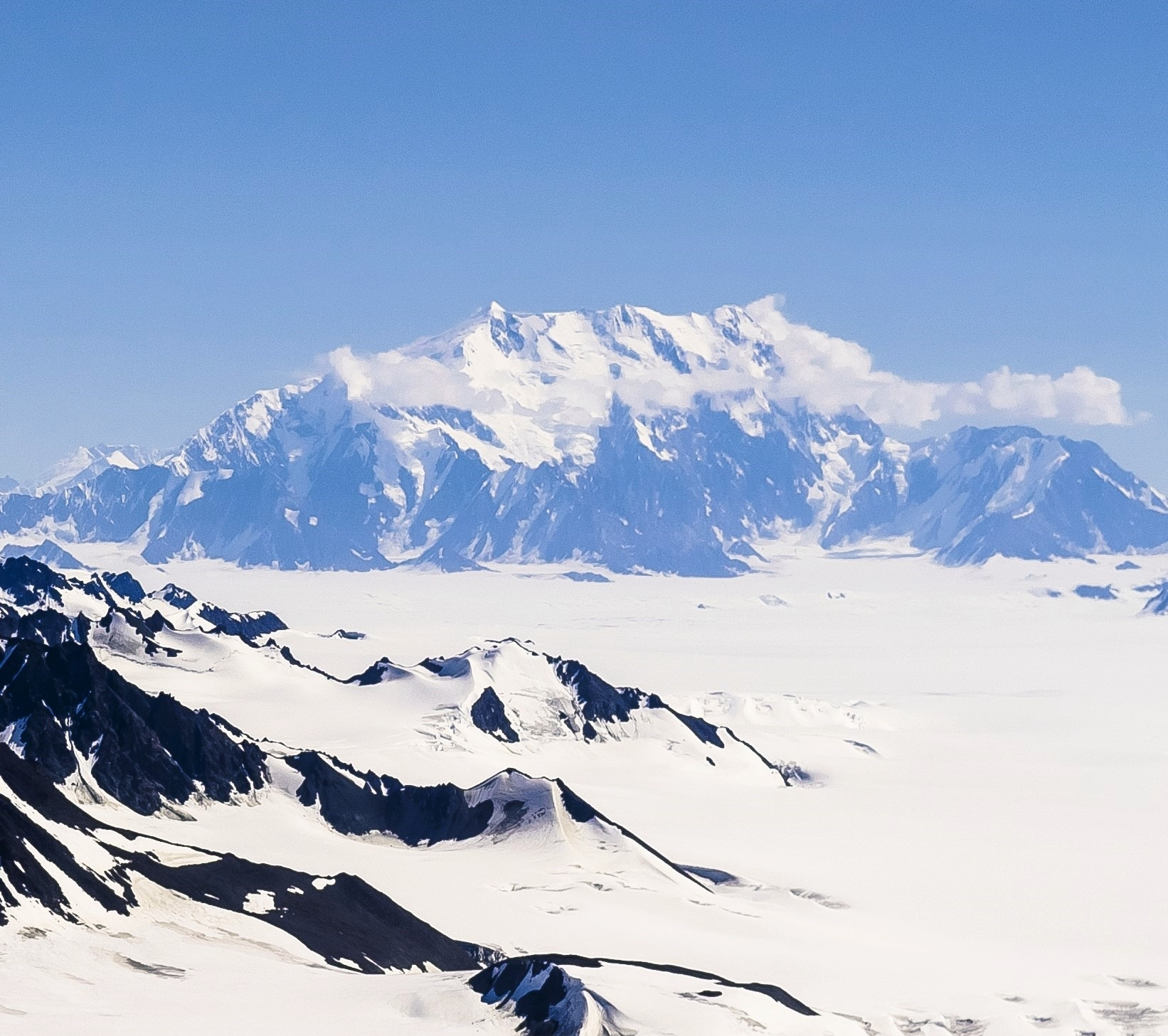
- West aspect

Highest point
- Elevation: 4,812 m (15,787 ft)
- Prominence: 2,692 m (8,832 ft)
- Listing: North America highest peaks 15th; North America prominent peak 26th; Canada highest major peaks 7th; Canada most prominent peaks 9th; Ultra
- Coordinates: 60°20′04″N 139°41′33″W

Geography
- Location within Alaska Location within Yukon
- Location: Yukon, Canada / Yakutat City and Borough, Alaska, United States
- Parent range: Saint Elias Mountains
- Topo maps: NTS 115B5 Mount Vancouver; USGS Mount Saint Elias B-5

Climbing
- First ascent: July 5, 1949
- Easiest route: Major Expedition

Mount Vancouver is the 15th highest mountain in North America. Its southern side lies in Glacier Bay National Park and Preserve at the top of the Alaska panhandle, while its northern side is in Kluane National Park and Reserve in the southwestern corner of Yukon, Canada. Mount Vancouver has three summits: north, middle, and south, with the middle summit being the lowest. The south summit, Good Neighbor Peak at 4,785 m (15,699 ft), straddles the international border while the north summit is slightly higher at 4,812 m (15,787 ft).

The mountain was named by William Healey Dall in 1874 after George Vancouver, who explored the southeast coast of Alaska from 1792 to 1794.

== Notable Ascents ==
- 1949 North Buttress (northwest ridge): FA of mountain by William Hainsworth, Alan Bruce-Robertson, Bob McCarter, Noel Odell; with Walter Wood in support.
- 1975 Northeast Ridge (to north peak), FA by Cliff Cantor, Bob Dangel, Paul Ledoux, Rob Milne, Hal Murray, Bob Walker, John Yates and Barton DeWolf.
- 1977 West Face, FA by John Lauchlan, John Calvert, Trevor Jones and Mike Sawyer.

== See also ==
- List of mountain peaks of North America
  - List of mountain peaks of Canada
  - List of mountain peaks of the United States
- List of Boundary Peaks of the Alaska-British Columbia/Yukon border
