= List of extreme summits of Canada =

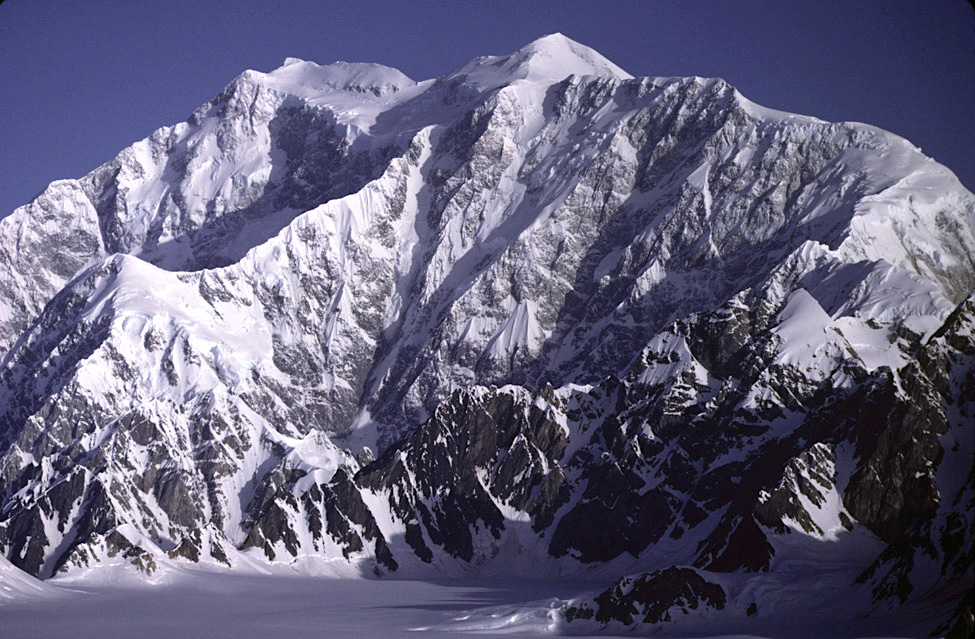
Mount Logan in the Saint Elias Mountains of Yukon is the highest summit of Canada.

This article comprises four sortable tables of mountain summits of Canada that are the higher than any other point north or south of their latitude or east or west their longitude in Canada.

The summit of a mountain or hill may be measured in three principal ways:

1. The topographic elevation of a summit measures the height of the summit above a geodetic sea level.
2. The topographic prominence of a summit is a measure of how high the summit rises above its surroundings.
3. The topographic isolation (or radius of dominance) of a summit measures how far the summit lies from its nearest point of equal elevation.

== Northernmost high summits ==
The northernmost summits of their elevation in Canada
Rank	Mountain peak	Province or Territory	Mountain range	Elevation	Prominence	Isolation	Location
10	Barbeau Peak (Note: The summit of Barbeau Peak is the highest point of Ellesmere Island and Nunavut of Canada.) (Note: Barbeau Peak is the northernmost ultra-prominent summit of Canada and greater North America.)	Nunavut	Ellesmere Island	2616 m 8,583 ft	2616 m 8,583 ft	796 km 495 mi	81.9148°N 75.0093°W
9	Mount Macdonald (Note: The summit of Mount Macdonald is the highest point of the Bonnet Plume Mountains.) (Note: Mount Macdonald is the northernmost summit of its elevation in Canada.)	Yukon	Mackenzie Mountains	2760 m 9,055 ft	1555 m 5,102 ft	187.5 km 116.5 mi	64.7256°N 132.7781°W
8	Keele Peak (Note: The summit of Keele Peak is the highest point of the Mackenzie Mountains.) (Note: Keele Peak is the northernmost summit of its elevation in Canada.)	Yukon	Mackenzie Mountains	2952 m 9,685 ft	2161 m 7,090 ft	543 km 337 mi	63.4314°N 130.3243°W
7	Mount Craig (Note: Mount Craig is the northernmost 4000-meter (13,123-foot) summit of Canada.)	Yukon	Saint Elias Mountains	4060 m 13,320 ft	520 m 1,706 ft	6.97 km 4.33 mi	61.2636°N 140.8800°W
6	Avalanche Peak (Note: Avalanche Peak is the northernmost summit of its elevation in Canada.)	Yukon	Saint Elias Mountains	4228 m 13,871 ft	608 m 1,995 ft	4.54 km 2.82 mi	61.2401°N 140.7597°W
5	Mount Strickland (Note: Mount Strickland is the northernmost summit of its elevation in Canada.)	Yukon	Saint Elias Mountains	4260 m 13,976 ft	800 m 2,625 ft	7.35 km 4.57 mi	61.2365°N 140.6755°W
4	Mount Wood (Note: Mount Wood is the northernmost summit of its elevation in Canada.)	Yukon	Saint Elias Mountains	4860 m 15,945 ft	1200 m 3,937 ft	18.95 km 11.77 mi	61.2326°N 140.5123°W
3	Mount Steele (Note: Mount Steele is the northernmost and easternmost 5000-meter (16,404-foot) summit of Canada.)	Yukon	Saint Elias Mountains	5020 m 16,470 ft	760 m 2,493 ft	9.45 km 5.87 mi	61.0929°N 140.3118°W
2	Mount Lucania (Note: The summit of Mount Lucania is the highest point of the northern Saint Elias Mountains.) (Note: Mount Lucania is the northernmost summit of its elevation in Canada.)	Yukon	Saint Elias Mountains	5260 m 17,257 ft	3080 m 10,105 ft	43 km 26.7 mi	61.0215°N 140.4661°W
1	Mount Logan (Note: The summit of Mount Logan is the highest point of the Saint Elias Mountains, Yukon, and all of Canada.)	Yukon	Saint Elias Mountains	5956 m 19,541 ft	5247 m 17,215 ft	623 km 387 mi	60.5671°N 140.4055°W

== Southernmost high summits ==
The southernmost summits of their elevation in Canada
Rank	Mountain peak	Province or Territory	Mountain range	Elevation	Prominence	Isolation	Location
12	White Hill (Note: The summit of White Hill is the highest point of Cape Breton Island and the Canadian Province of Nova Scotia.) (Note: White Hill is the southernmost 500-meter (1640-foot) summit of Canada.)	Nova Scotia	Cape Breton Island	535 m 1,755 ft	535 m 1,755 ft	151.6 km 94.2 mi	46.7022°N 60.5989°W
11	Mont Raoul-Blanchard (Note: The summit of Mont Raoul-Blanchard is the highest point of the Laurentian Mountains.) (Note: Mont Raoul-Blanchard is the southernmost 1000-meter (3281-foot) summit of Canada.)	Quebec	Laurentian Mountains	1175 m 3,855 ft	790 m 2,592 ft	206 km 128.2 mi	47.3100°N 70.8312°W
10	Mont Jacques-Cartier (Note: The summit of Mont Jacques-Cartier is the highest point of the Canadian Appalachians.) (Note: Mont Jacques-Cartier is the southernmost summit of its elevation in Canada.)	Quebec	Chic-Choc Mountains	1268 m 4,160 ft	1093 m 3,585 ft	406 km 252 mi	48.9879°N 65.9483°W
9	Silvertip Mountain (Note: The summit of Silvertip Mountain is the highest point of the Hope Mountains.) (Note: Silvertip Mountain is the southernmost ultra-prominent summit of Canada.)	British Columbia	Cascade Range	2596 m 8,517 ft	1866 m 6,122 ft	19.55 km 12.15 mi	49.1633°N 121.2161°W
8	Cond Peak (Note: The summit of Cond Peak is the highest point of the Kokanee Range.) (Note: Cond Peak is the southernmost summit of its elevation in Canada.)	British Columbia	Columbia Mountains	2801 m 9,190 ft	1720 m 5,643 ft	35.3 km 21.9 mi	49.7462°N 117.1419°W
7	Gladsheim Peak (Note: Gladsheim Peak is the southernmost summit of its elevation in Canada.)	British Columbia	Columbia Mountains	2830 m 9,285 ft	2056 m 6,745 ft	53.4 km 33.2 mi	49.7867°N 117.6272°W
6	Mount Harrison (Note: Mount Harrison is the southernmost and easternmost 3000-meter (9843-foot) summit of Canada.)	British Columbia	Canadian Rockies	3360 m 11,024 ft	1770 m 5,807 ft	52.1 km 32.4 mi	50.0604°N 115.2057°W
5	Mount Assiniboine (Note: Mount Assiniboine is the southernmost and easternmost summit of its elevation in Canada.)	Alberta; British Columbia	Canadian Rockies	3616 m 11,864 ft	2082 m 6,831 ft	141.8 km 88.1 mi	50.8696°N 115.6509°W
4	Mount Waddington (Note: The summit of Mount Waddington is the highest point of the Coast Mountains.) (Note: Mount Waddington is the southernmost and easternmost 4000-meter (13,123-foot) summit of Canada.)	British Columbia	Coast Mountains	4019 m 13,186 ft	3289 m 10,791 ft	562 km 349 mi	51.3737°N 125.2636°W
3	Mount Fairweather (Note: Mount Fairweather lies on the international border between Alaska and British Columbia. The peak is the highest point of the Canadian Province of British Columbia and the southernmost and easternmost summit of its elevation in both Canada and the United States.) (Fairweather Mountain)	Alaska; British Columbia	Saint Elias Mountains	4671 m 15,325 ft	3961 m 12,995 ft	200 km 124.4 mi	58.9064°N 137.5265°W
2	Mount Saint Elias (Note: Mount Saint Elias is the second highest major summit of both Canada and the United States.)	Alaska; Yukon	Saint Elias Mountains	5489 m 18,009 ft	3429 m 11,250 ft	41.3 km 25.6 mi	60.2927°N 140.9307°W
1	Mount Logan	Yukon	Saint Elias Mountains	5956 m 19,541 ft	5247 m 17,215 ft	623 km 387 mi	60.5671°N 140.4055°W

== Easternmost high summits ==
The easternmost summits of their elevation in Canada
Rank	Mountain peak	Province or Territory	Mountain range	Elevation	Prominence	Isolation	Location
20	Gros Morne (Note: Gros Morne is the easternmost 500-meter (1640-foot) summit of Canada.)	Newfoundland and Labrador	Island of Newfoundland	806 m 2,644 ft	693 m 2,272 ft	98.8 km 61.4 mi	49.5942°N 57.7838°W
19	The Cabox (Note: The summit of The Cabox is the highest point of the island of Newfoundland.) (Note: The Cabox is the easternmost summit of its elevation in Canada.)	Newfoundland and Labrador	Island of Newfoundland	812 m 2,664 ft	812 m 2,664 ft	501 km 311 mi	48.8331°N 58.4843°W
18	Mealy Mountains high point (Note: Mealy Mountains high point is the easternmost 1000-meter (3281-foot) summit of Canada.)	Newfoundland and Labrador	Mealy Mountains	1190 m 3,904 ft	832 m 2,728 ft	519 km 323 mi	53.6465°N 58.5536°W
17	Brave Mountain (Note: The summit of Brave Mountain is the highest point of the Kaumajet Mountains.) (Note: Brave Mountain is the easternmost summit of its elevation in Canada.)	Newfoundland and Labrador	Kaumajet Mountains	1234 m 4,050 ft	1219 m 3,999 ft	90.4 km 56.1 mi	57.8814°N 62.0263°W
16	Angna Mountain (Note: Angna Mountain is the easternmost ultra-prominent summit of Canada.)	Nunavut	Baffin Island	1710 m 5,610 ft	1510 m 4,954 ft	73.7 km 45.8 mi	66.5595°N 62.0273°W
15	Touak Peak (Note: Touak Peak is the easternmost summit of its elevation in Canada.) (Peak 1840)	Nunavut	Baffin Island	1840 m 6,037 ft	1617 m 5,305 ft	84.9 km 52.8 mi	66.1519°N 63.4918°W
14	Tupeq Mountain (Note: Tupeq Mountain is the easternmost 2000-meter (6562-foot) summit of Canada.)	Nunavut	Baffin Island	2020 m 6,627 ft	1638 m 5,374 ft	14.21 km 8.83 mi	66.5737°N 65.0717°W
13	Mount Odin (Note: The summit of Mount Odin is the highest point of Baffin Island.) (Note: Mount Odin is the easternmost summit of its elevation in Canada.)	Nunavut	Baffin Island	2143 m 7,031 ft	2143 m 7,031 ft	586 km 364 mi	66.5468°N 65.4289°W
12	Mount Harrison	British Columbia	Canadian Rockies	3360 m 11,024 ft	1770 m 5,807 ft	52.1 km 32.4 mi	50.0604°N 115.2057°W
11	Mount Joffre (Note: Mount Joffre is the easternmost summit of its elevation in Canada.)	Alberta; British Columbia	Canadian Rockies	3433 m 11,263 ft	1505 m 4,938 ft	49.2 km 30.6 mi	50.5285°N 115.2069°W
10	Mount Assiniboine	Alberta; British Columbia	Canadian Rockies	3616 m 11,864 ft	2082 m 6,831 ft	141.8 km 88.1 mi	50.8696°N 115.6509°W
9	Mount Forbes (Note: The summit of Mount Forbes is the highest point of the entire Hudson Bay drainage basin.) (Note: Mount Forbes is the easternmost summit of its elevation in Canada.)	Alberta	Canadian Rockies	3617 m 11,867 ft	1649 m 5,410 ft	47.4 km 29.5 mi	51.8600°N 116.9316°W
8	North Twin Peak (Note: North Twin Peak is the easternmost summit of its elevation in Canada.)	Alberta	Canadian Rockies	3733 m 12,247 ft	743 m 2,438 ft	8.52 km 5.29 mi	52.2238°N 117.4345°W
7	Mount Columbia (Note: Mount Columbia on the Great Divide between British Columbia and Alberta is the highest point of the Columbia Icefield, the Province of Alberta, and the entire Beaufort Sea Drainage basin.)	Alberta; British Columbia	Canadian Rockies	3741 m 12,274 ft	2371 m 7,779 ft	158 km 98.2 mi	52.1473°N 117.4416°W
6	Mount Robson (Note: The summit of Mount Robson is the highest point of the Canadian Rockies.) (Note: Mount Robson is the easternmost summit of its elevation in Canada and the northernmost and westernmost summit of its elevation in the Rocky Mountains.)	British Columbia	Canadian Rockies	3959 m 12,989 ft	2829 m 9,281 ft	460 km 286 mi	53.1105°N 119.1566°W
5	Mount Waddington	British Columbia	Coast Mountains	4019 m 13,186 ft	3289 m 10,791 ft	562 km 349 mi	51.3737°N 125.2636°W
4	Mount Fairweather (Fairweather Mountain)	Alaska; British Columbia	Saint Elias Mountains	4671 m 15,325 ft	3961 m 12,995 ft	200 km 124.4 mi	58.9064°N 137.5265°W
3	Mount Vancouver (Note: Mount Vancouver is the easternmost summit of its elevation in Canada.)	Yukon	Saint Elias Mountains	4812 m 15,787 ft	2712 m 8,898 ft	44 km 27.4 mi	60.3589°N 139.6980°W
2	Mount Steele	Yukon	Saint Elias Mountains	5020 m 16,470 ft	760 m 2,493 ft	9.45 km 5.87 mi	61.0929°N 140.3118°W
1	Mount Logan	Yukon	Saint Elias Mountains	5956 m 19,541 ft	5247 m 17,215 ft	623 km 387 mi	60.5671°N 140.4055°W

== Westernmost high summits ==
Mount Saint Elias and Mount Logan are the two highest summits of Canada.

The westernmost summits of their elevation in Canada
Rank	Mountain peak	Province or Territory	Mountain range	Elevation	Prominence	Isolation	Location
2	Mount Saint Elias	Alaska; Yukon	Saint Elias Mountains	5489 m 18,009 ft	3429 m 11,250 ft	41.3 km 25.6 mi	60.2927°N 140.9307°W
1	Mount Logan	Yukon	Saint Elias Mountains	5956 m 19,541 ft	5247 m 17,215 ft	623 km 387 mi	60.5671°N 140.4055°W

== Gallery ==
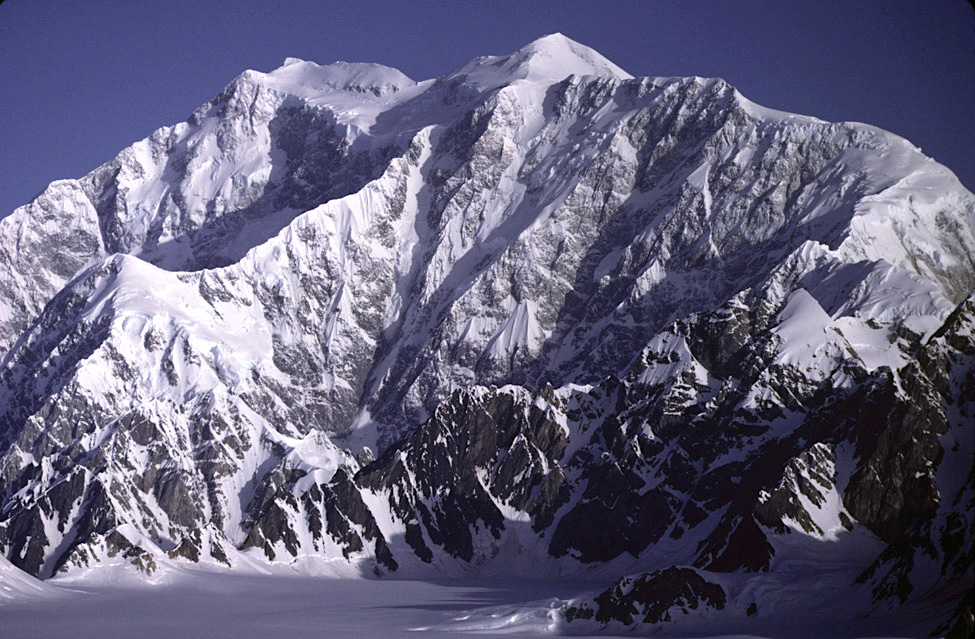
Mount Logan in Yukon is the highest summit of Canada.

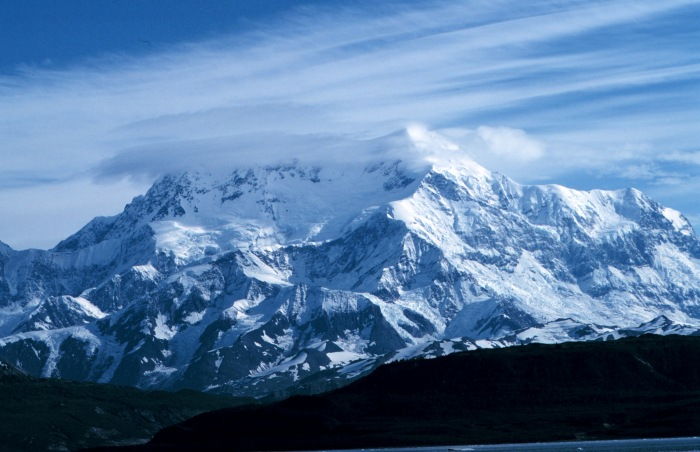
Mount Saint Elias is the second highest summit of both Canada and the United States.

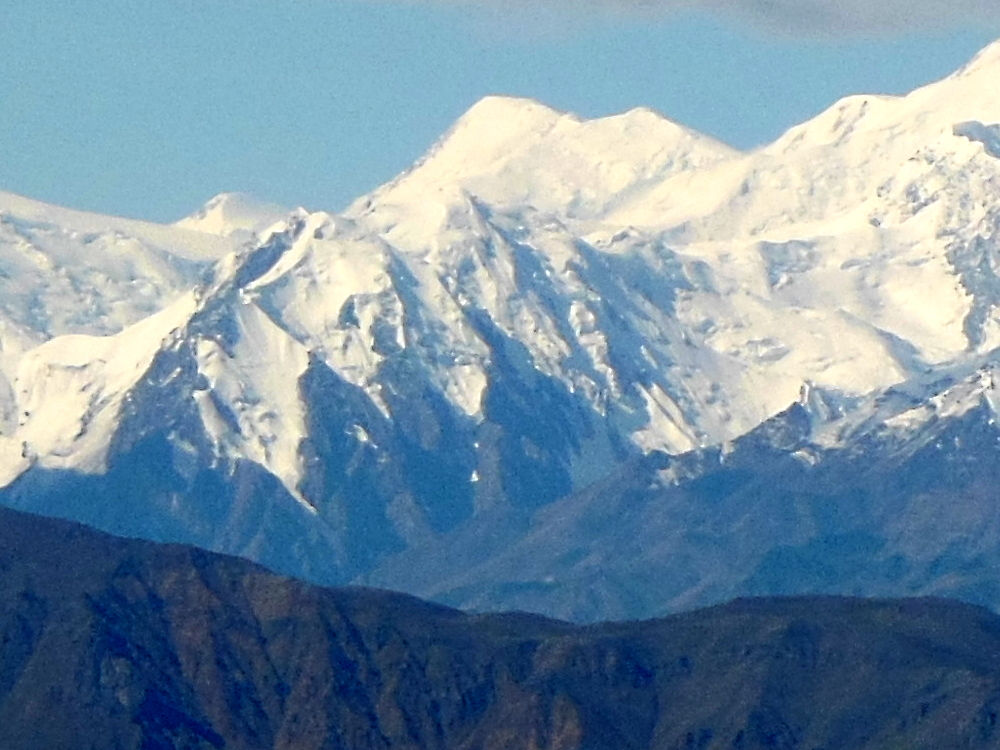
Mount Lucania in Yukon is the highest summit of the northern Saint Elias Mountains.

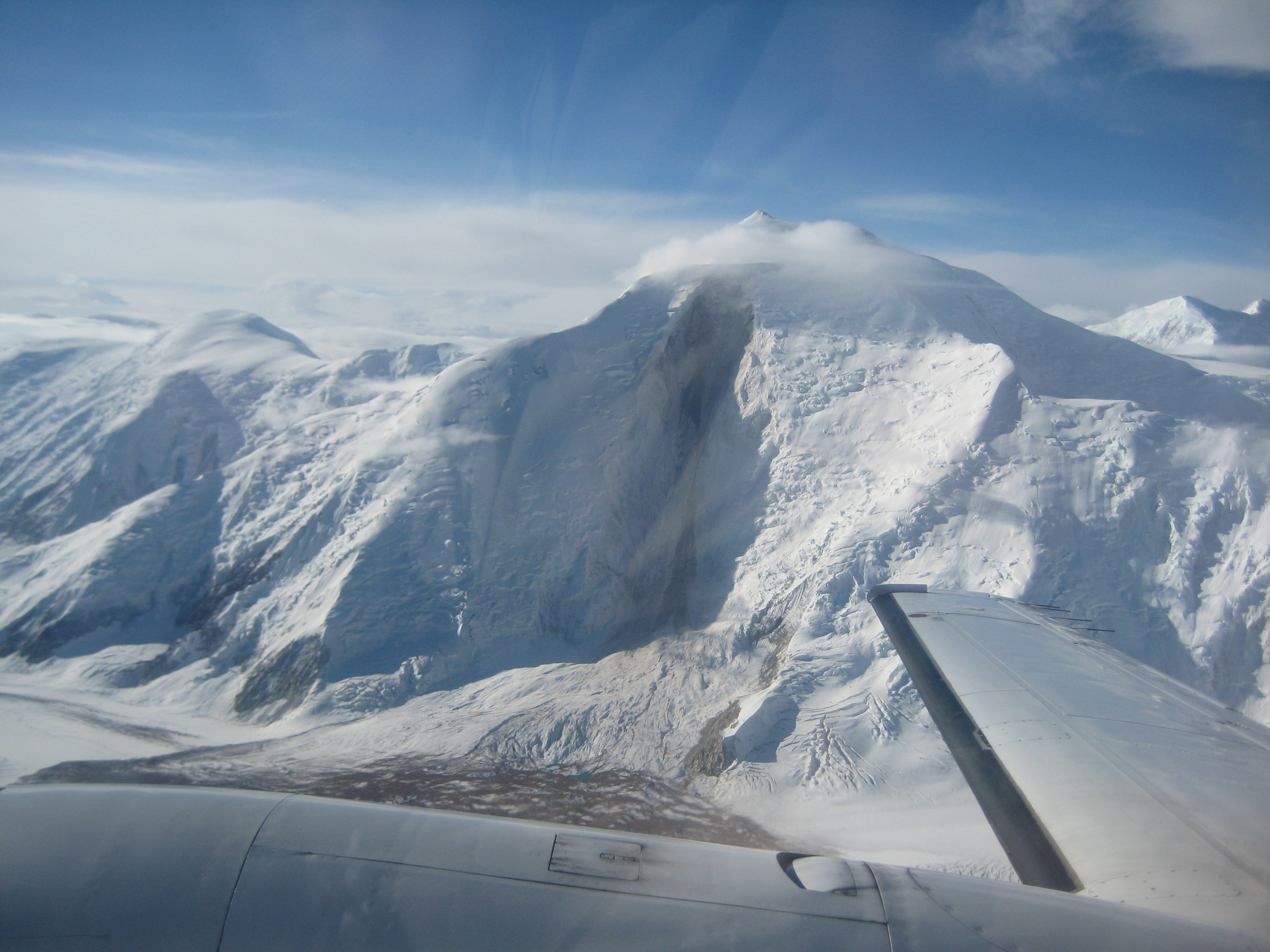
Mount Steele in Yukon is the fifth highest summit of Canada.

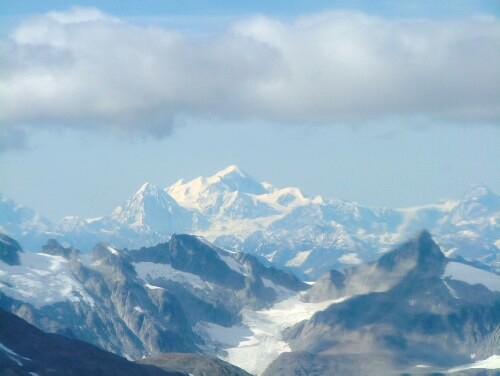
Mount Fairweather on the Alaska border is the highest summit of British Columbia.

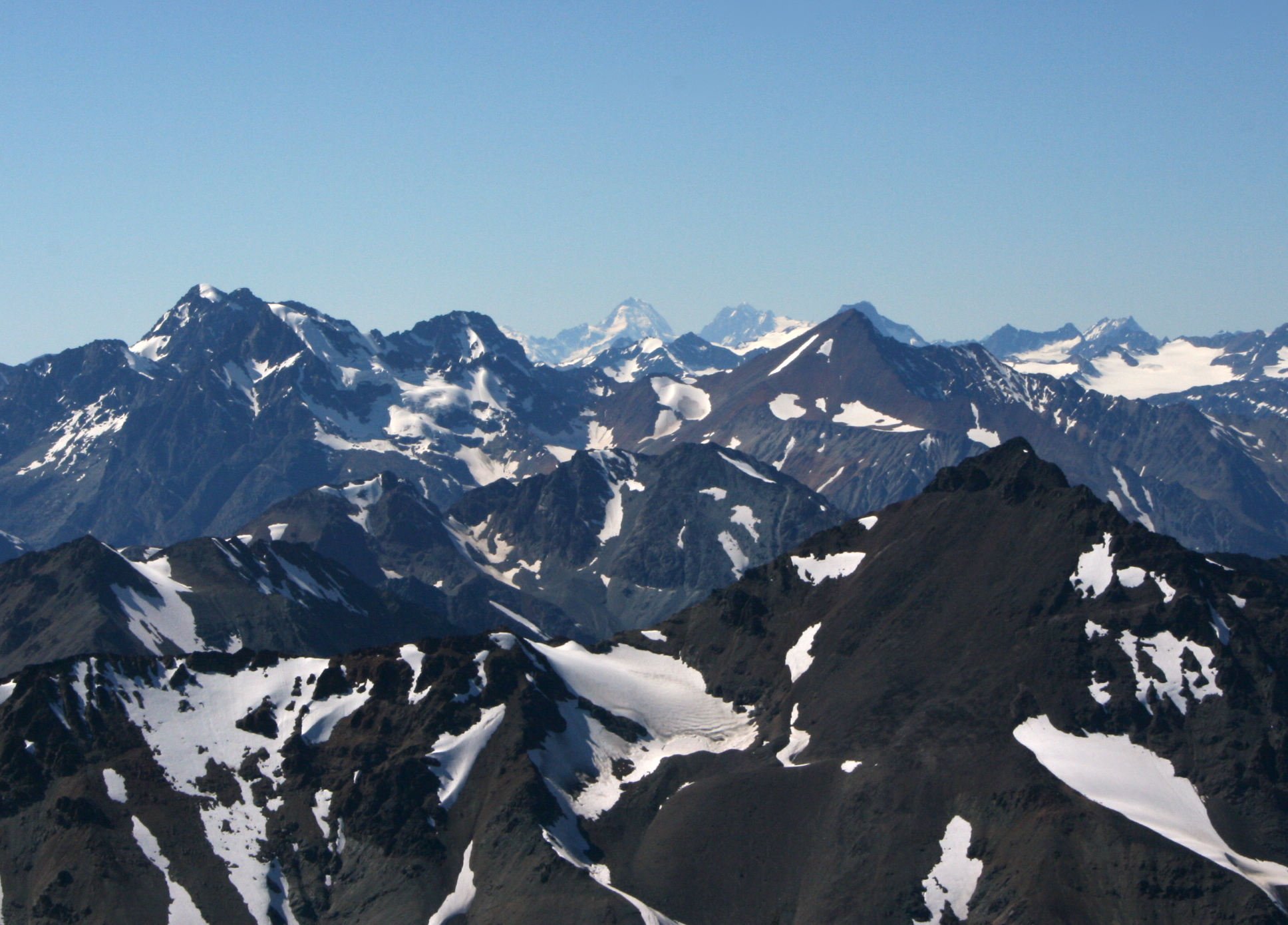
Mount Waddington is the highest summit of the Coast Mountains of British Columbia.

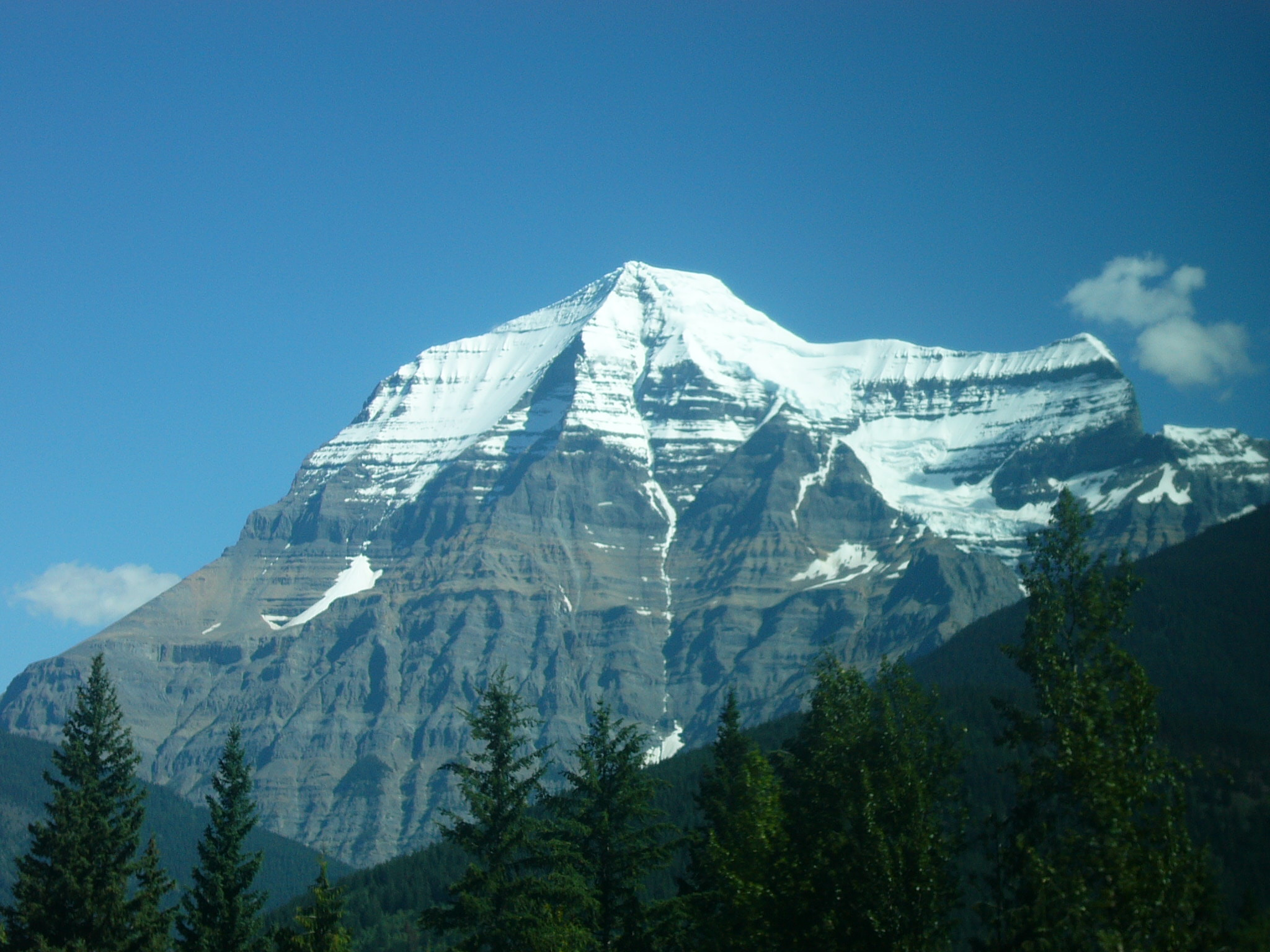
Mount Robson in British Columbia is the highest summit of the Canadian Rockies.

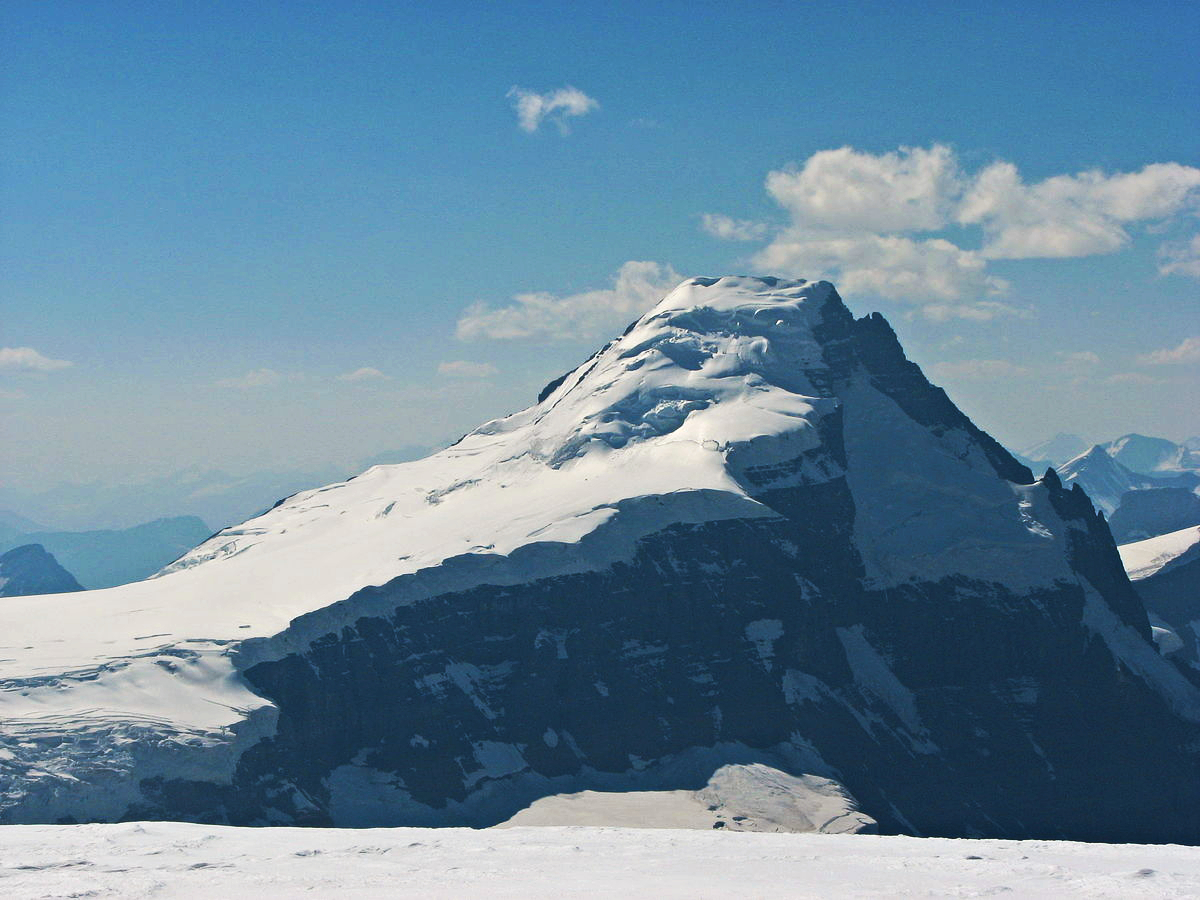
Mount Columbia on the British Columbia border is the highest summit of Alberta.

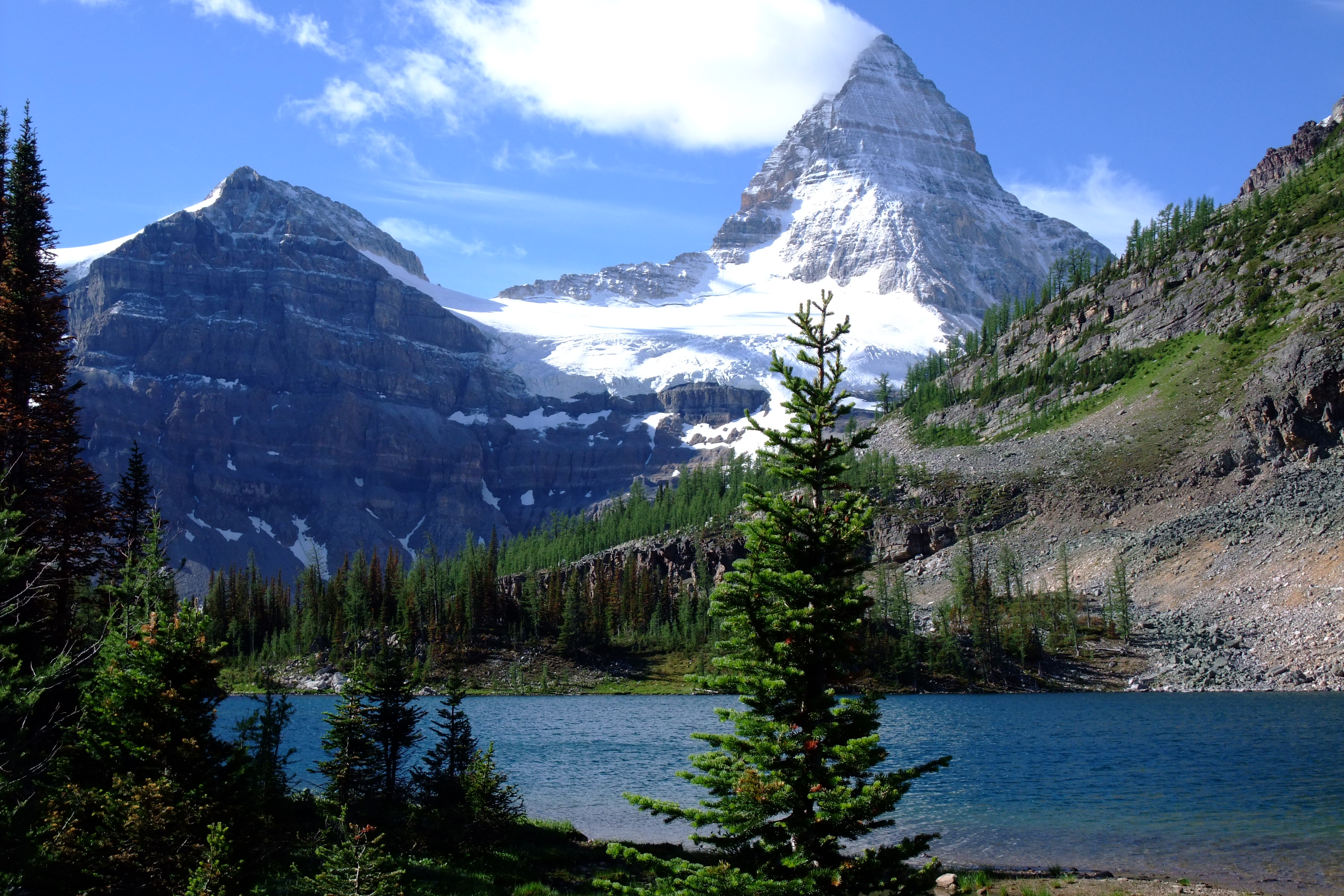
Mount Assiniboine on the Great Divide.

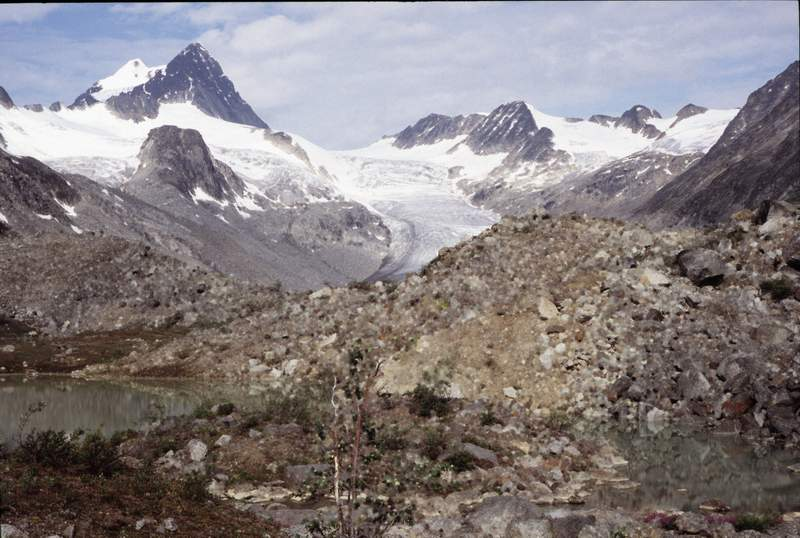
Keele Peak is the highest summit of the Mackenzie Mountains of Yukon.

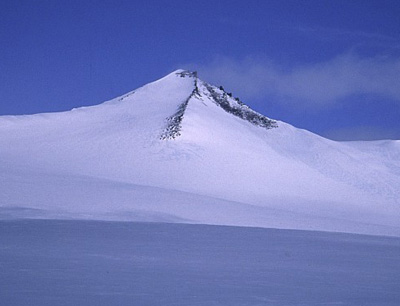
Barbeau Peak is the highest summit of Ellesmere Island and Nunavut.

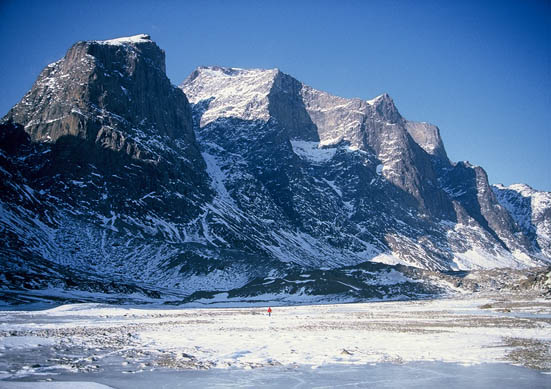
Mount Odin is the highest summit of Baffin Island.

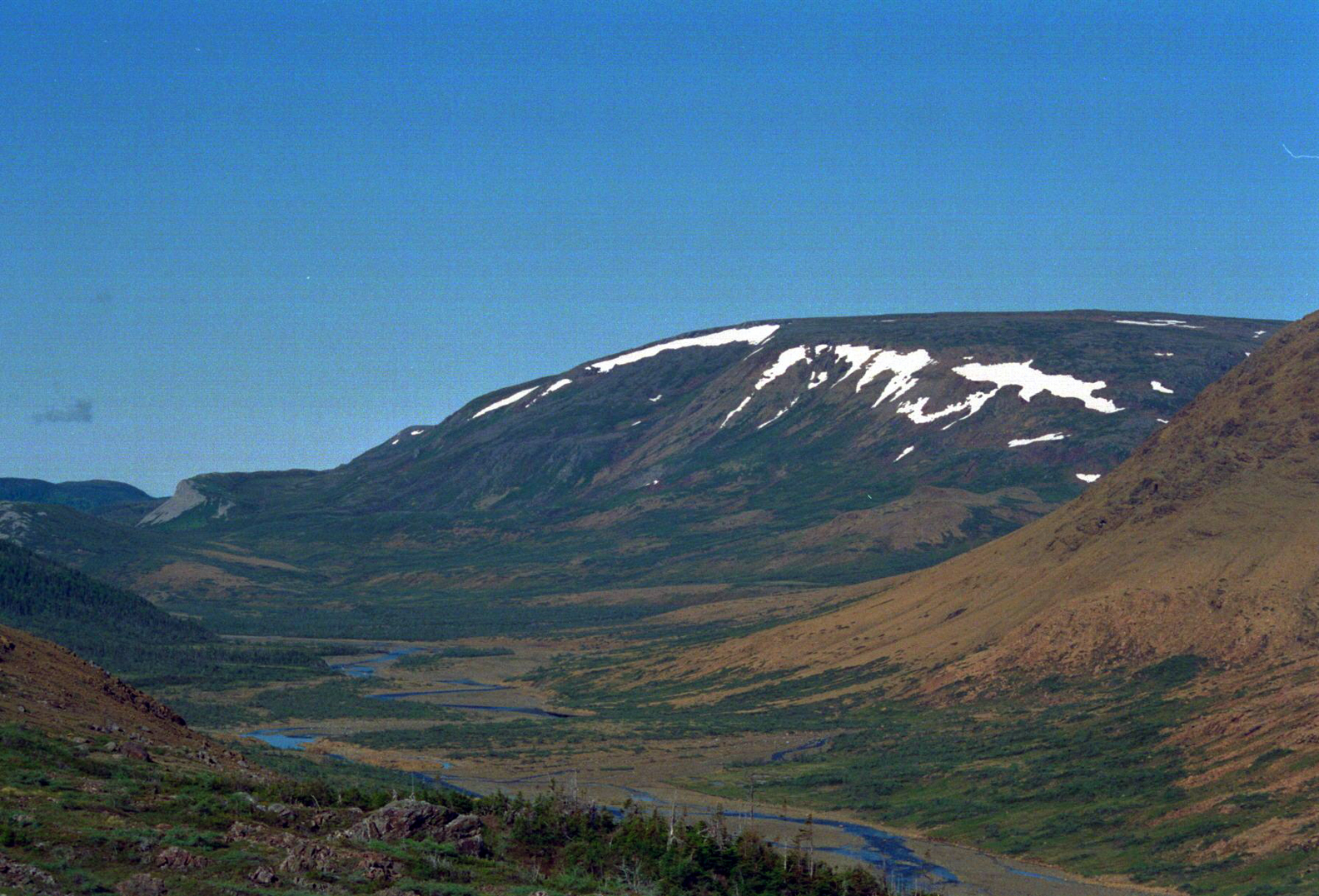
The Cabox is the highest summit of Newfoundland.

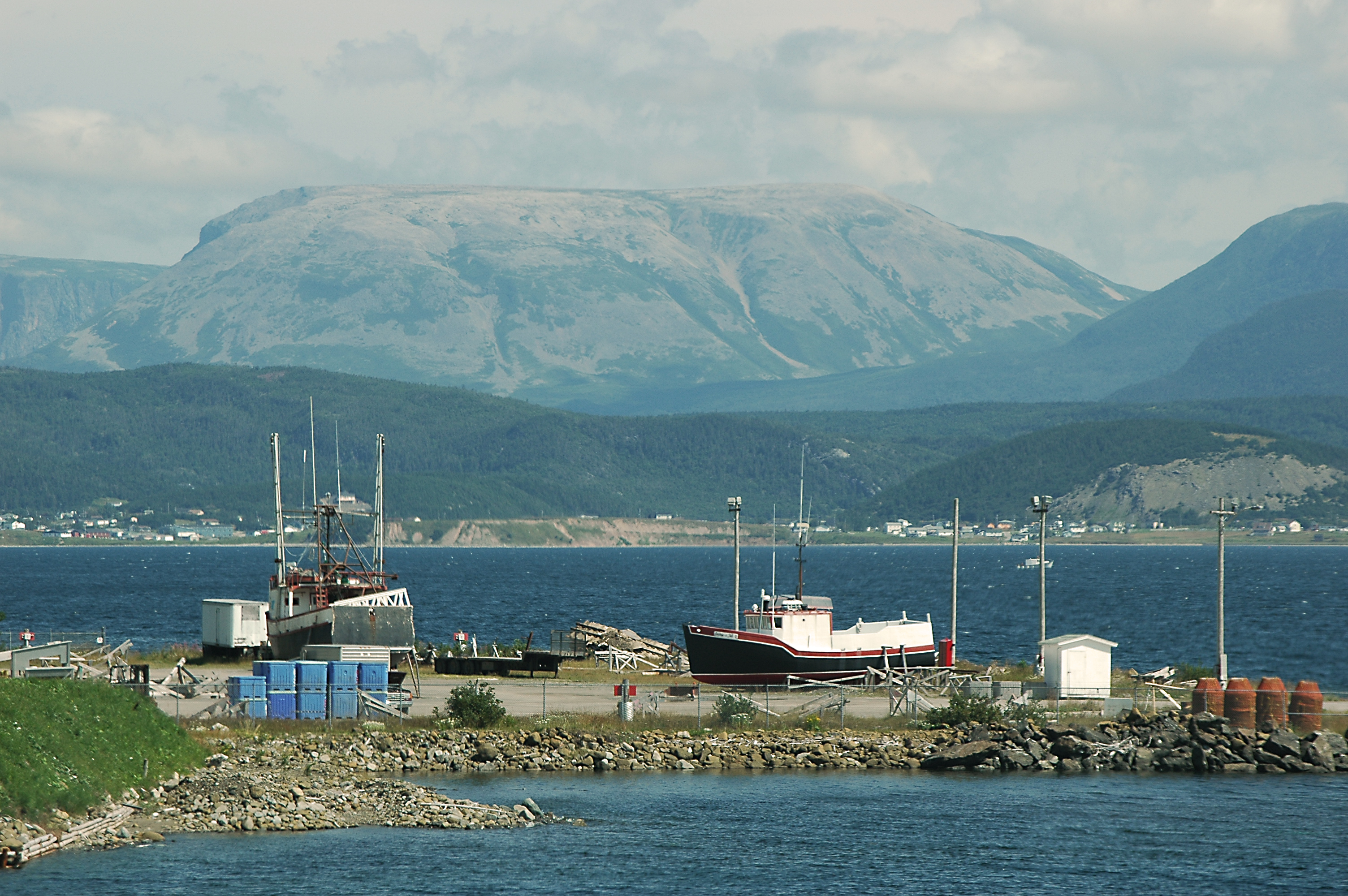
Gros Morne on Newfoundland.

== See also ==
- List of mountain peaks of North America
  - List of mountain peaks of Greenland
  - List of mountain peaks of Canada
    - List of the highest major summits of Canada
      - List of the major 4000-metre summits of Canada
      - List of the major 3000-metre summits of Canada
    - List of the most prominent summits of Canada
      - List of the ultra-prominent summits of Canada
    - List of the most isolated major summits of Canada
    - List of extreme summits of Canada
  - List of mountain peaks of the Rocky Mountains
  - List of mountain peaks of the United States
  - List of mountain peaks of México
  - List of mountain peaks of Central America
  - List of mountain peaks of the Caribbean
- Canada
  - Geography of Canada
    - Category:Mountains of Canada
      - commons:Category:Mountains of Canada
- Physical geography
  - Topography
    - Topographic elevation
    - Topographic prominence
    - Topographic isolation
