= List of the most isolated major summits of Canada =

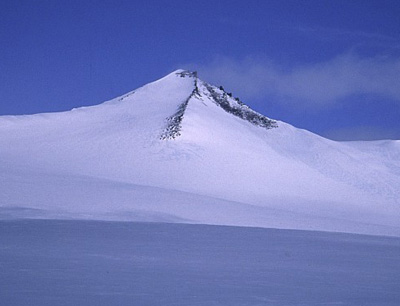
Barbeau Peak on Ellesmere Island is the highest point of Nunavut and the most isolated major summit of Canada.

The following sortable table comprises the 150 most topographically isolated mountain peaks of Canada with at least 500 metres (1640 feet) of topographic prominence.

The summit of a mountain or hill may be measured in three principal ways:

1. The topographic elevation of a summit measures the height of the summit above a geodetic sea level.
2. The topographic prominence of a summit is a measure of how high the summit rises above its surroundings.
3. The topographic isolation (or radius of dominance) of a summit measures how far the summit lies from its nearest point of equal elevation.

Twelve major summits of Canada exceed 500 kilometers (310.7 miles) of topographic isolation, 31 exceed 200 kilometers (124.3 miles), 50 exceed 100 kilometers (62.14 miles), and 92 major summits exceed 50 kilometers (31.07 miles) of topographic isolation.

== Most isolated major summits ==
Of the 150 most isolated major summits of Canada, 98 are located in British Columbia, 16 in Nunavut, 16 in Yukon, seven in Alberta, six in Newfoundland and Labrador, five in Quebec, three in the Northwest Territories, and one each in Nova Scotia and New Brunswick. Three of these summits lie on the British Columbia-Alberta border and one lies on the British Columbia-Yukon border. Four of these summits lie on the international British Columbia-Alaska border and two lie on the international Yukon-Alaska border.

The 150 most topographically isolated summits of Canada with at least 500 metres of topographic prominence
Rank	Mountain Peak	Province	Mountain Range	Elevation	Prominence	Isolation	Location
1	Barbeau Peak (Note: The summit of Barbeau Peak is the highest point of Ellesmere Island and Nunavut of Canada.) (Note: Barbeau Peak is the northernmost ultra-prominent summit of Canada and greater North America.)	Nunavut	Ellesmere Island	2616 m 8,583 ft	2616 m 8,583 ft	796 km 495 mi	81.9148°N 75.0093°W
2	Mount Caubvick (Note: The summit of Mount Caubvick is the highest point of the Torngat Mountains, the Province of Newfoundland and Labrador, and all of eastern Canada.) (Mont d'Iberville)	Newfoundland and Labrador	Torngat Mountains	1652 m 5,420 ft	1367 m 4,485 ft	791 km 492 mi	58.8878°N 63.7098°W
3	Melville Island high point	Nunavut	Melville Island	762 m 2,500 ft	762 m 2,500 ft	717 km 445 mi	75.3694°N 115.0827°W
4	Mathiassen Mountain (Note: The summit of Mathiassen Mountain is the highest point of Southampton Island.)	Nunavut	Southampton Island	625 m 2,051 ft	625 m 2,051 ft	627 km 390 mi	64.7403°N 83.1573°W
5	Mount Logan (Note: The summit of Mount Logan is the highest point of the Saint Elias Mountains, Yukon, and all of Canada.)	Yukon	Saint Elias Mountains	5956 m 19,541 ft	5247 m 17,215 ft	623 km 387 mi	60.5671°N 140.4055°W
6	Angilaaq Mountain (Note: The summit of Angilaaq Mountain is the highest point of Bylot Island.)	Nunavut	Bylot Island	1944 m 6,378 ft	1944 m 6,378 ft	622 km 387 mi	73.2298°N 78.6230°W
7	Mount Odin (Note: The summit of Mount Odin is the highest point of Baffin Island.) (Note: Mount Odin is the easternmost summit of its elevation in Canada.)	Nunavut	Baffin Island	2143 m 7,031 ft	2143 m 7,031 ft	586 km 364 mi	66.5468°N 65.4289°W
8	Mount Waddington (Note: The summit of Mount Waddington is the highest point of the Coast Mountains.) (Note: Mount Waddington is the southernmost and easternmost 4000-meter (13,123-foot) summit of Canada.)	British Columbia	Coast Mountains	4019 m 13,186 ft	3289 m 10,791 ft	562 km 349 mi	51.3737°N 125.2636°W
9	Melville Hills high point	Northwest Territories	Melville Hills	876 m 2,875 ft	500 m 1,640 ft	551 km 342 mi	69.2425°N 121.5391°W
10	Keele Peak (Note: The summit of Keele Peak is the highest point of the Mackenzie Mountains.) (Note: Keele Peak is the northernmost summit of its elevation in Canada.)	Yukon	Mackenzie Mountains	2952 m 9,685 ft	2161 m 7,090 ft	543 km 337 mi	63.4314°N 130.3243°W
11	Mealy Mountains high point (Note: Mealy Mountains high point is the easternmost 1000-meter (3281-foot) summit of Canada.)	Newfoundland and Labrador	Mealy Mountains	1190 m 3,904 ft	832 m 2,728 ft	519 km 323 mi	53.6465°N 58.5536°W
12	The Cabox (Note: The summit of The Cabox is the highest point of the island of Newfoundland.) (Note: The Cabox is the easternmost summit of its elevation in Canada.)	Newfoundland and Labrador	Island of Newfoundland	812 m 2,664 ft	812 m 2,664 ft	501 km 311 mi	48.8331°N 58.4843°W
13	Mont Yapeitso (Note: The summit of Mont Yapeitso is the highest point of the Monts Otish.)	Quebec	Monts Otish	1135 m 3,725 ft	500 m 1,640 ft	467 km 290 mi	52.3223°N 70.4451°W
14	Mount Robson (Note: The summit of Mount Robson is the highest point of the Canadian Rockies.) (Note: Mount Robson is the easternmost summit of its elevation in Canada and the northernmost and westernmost summit of its elevation in the Rocky Mountains.)	British Columbia	Canadian Rockies	3959 m 12,989 ft	2829 m 9,281 ft	460 km 286 mi	53.1105°N 119.1566°W
15	Ulysses Mountain (Note: The summit of Ulysses Mountain is the highest point of the Far Northern Rockies.) (Note: Ulysses Mountain is the northernmost 3000-metre (9843-foot) summit of the Rocky Mountains.) (Mount Ulysses)	British Columbia	Muskwa Ranges	3024 m 9,921 ft	2294 m 7,526 ft	436 km 271 mi	57.3464°N 124.0928°W
16	Mont Jacques-Cartier (Note: The summit of Mont Jacques-Cartier is the highest point of the Canadian Appalachians.) (Note: Mont Jacques-Cartier is the southernmost summit of its elevation in Canada.)	Quebec	Chic-Choc Mountains	1268 m 4,160 ft	1093 m 3,585 ft	406 km 252 mi	48.9879°N 65.9483°W
17	Victoria Island high point	Nunavut	Victoria Island	655 m 2,149 ft	655 m 2,149 ft	375 km 233 mi	71.8528°N 112.6073°W
18	Kisimngiuqtuq Peak	Nunavut	Baffin Island	1905 m 6,250 ft	1605 m 5,266 ft	362 km 225 mi	70.7993°N 71.6502°W
19	Beitstad Peak	Nunavut	Ellesmere Island	2347 m 7,700 ft	2044 m 6,706 ft	354 km 220 mi	78.8007°N 79.5292°W
20	Mount Ratz (Note: The summit of Mount Ratz is the highest point of the Boundary Ranges.)	British Columbia	Coast Mountains	3090 m 10,138 ft	2430 m 7,972 ft	311 km 193.4 mi	57.3930°N 132.3031°W
21	Outlook Peak (Note: The summit of Outlook Peak is the highest point of Axel Heiberg Island.)	Nunavut	Axel Heiberg Island	2210 m 7,251 ft	2210 m 7,251 ft	268 km 166.3 mi	79.7397°N 91.4061°W
22	Devon Ice Cap high point (Note: The summit of Devon Ice Cap high point is the highest point of Devon Island.)	Nunavut	Devon Island	1920 m 6,300 ft	1920 m 6,300 ft	265 km 164.6 mi	75.3429°N 82.6186°W
23	Manuel Peak (Note: The summit of Manuel Peak is the highest point of the Richardson Mountains.)	Yukon	Richardson Mountains	1722 m 5,650 ft	1292 m 4,239 ft	260 km 161.6 mi	67.9833°N 136.5833°W
24	Howson Peak (Note: The summit of Howson Peak is the highest point of the Hazleton Mountains.)	British Columbia	Coast Mountains	2759 m 9,052 ft	1829 m 6,001 ft	254 km 158 mi	54.4185°N 127.7441°W
25	Fox Mountain (Note: The summit of Fox Mountain is the highest point of the Pelly Mountains.)	Yukon	Pelly Mountains	2404 m 7,887 ft	1444 m 4,738 ft	229 km 142.5 mi	61.9224°N 133.3677°W
26	Cap Mountain (Note: The summit of Cap Mountain is the highest point of the Franklin Mountains.)	Northwest Territories	Franklin Mountains	1577 m 5,175 ft	500 m 1,640 ft	228 km 141.5 mi	63.4063°N 123.2061°W
27	Mount Frank Rae (Note: The summit of Mount Frank Rae is the highest point of the Ogilvie Mountains.)	Yukon	Ogilvie Mountains	2362 m 7,750 ft	1367 m 4,486 ft	224 km 139.4 mi	64.4706°N 138.5553°W
28	Mount Nirvana (Note: The summit of Mount Nirvana is the highest point of the Northwest Territories of Canada.)	Northwest Territories	Mackenzie Mountains	2773 m 9,098 ft	1663 m 5,456 ft	220 km 136.8 mi	61.8752°N 127.6807°W
29	Durham Heights (Note: The summit of Durham Heights is the highest point of Banks Island.)	Nunavut	Banks Island	724 m 2,375 ft	724 m 2,375 ft	218 km 135.4 mi	71.1358°N 122.9531°W
30	Mont Raoul-Blanchard (Note: The summit of Mont Raoul-Blanchard is the highest point of the Laurentian Mountains.) (Note: Mont Raoul-Blanchard is the southernmost 1000-meter (3281-foot) summit of Canada.)	Quebec	Laurentian Mountains	1175 m 3,855 ft	790 m 2,592 ft	206 km 128.2 mi	47.3100°N 70.8312°W
31	Mount Fairweather (Note: Mount Fairweather lies on the international border between Alaska and British Columbia. The peak is the highest point of the Canadian Province of British Columbia and the southernmost and easternmost summit of its elevation in both Canada and the United States.) (Fairweather Mountain)	Alaska; British Columbia	Saint Elias Mountains	4671 m 15,325 ft	3961 m 12,995 ft	200 km 124.4 mi	58.9064°N 137.5265°W
32	Mount Macdonald (Note: The summit of Mount Macdonald is the highest point of the Bonnet Plume Mountains.) (Note: Mount Macdonald is the northernmost summit of its elevation in Canada.)	Yukon	Mackenzie Mountains	2760 m 9,055 ft	1555 m 5,102 ft	187.5 km 116.5 mi	64.7256°N 132.7781°W
33	Mont Veyrier (Note: The summit of Mont Veyrier is the highest point of the Monts Groulx.)	Quebec	Canadian Shield	1104 m 3,622 ft	500 m 1,640 ft	185.2 km 115.1 mi	51.5309°N 68.0763°W
34	Mount Moresby (Note: The summit of Mount Moresby is the highest point of Moresby Island.)	British Columbia	Moresby Island	1164 m 3,819 ft	1164 m 3,819 ft	184.3 km 114.5 mi	53.0191°N 132.0856°W
35	Grey Hunter Peak	Yukon	North Yukon Plateau	2214 m 7,264 ft	1519 m 4,984 ft	178.7 km 111 mi	63.1357°N 135.6359°W
36	Mount Columbia (Note: Mount Columbia on the Great Divide between British Columbia and Alberta is the highest point of the Columbia Icefield, the Province of Alberta, and the entire Beaufort Sea Drainage basin.)	Alberta; British Columbia	Canadian Rockies	3741 m 12,274 ft	2371 m 7,779 ft	158 km 98.2 mi	52.1473°N 117.4416°W
37	Skihist Mountain (Note: The summit of Skihist Mountain is the highest point of the Lillooet Range.)	British Columbia	Coast Mountains	2968 m 9,738 ft	2458 m 8,064 ft	157.1 km 97.6 mi	50.1878°N 121.9032°W
38	White Hill (Note: The summit of White Hill is the highest point of Cape Breton Island and the Canadian Province of Nova Scotia.) (Note: White Hill is the southernmost 500-meter (1640-foot) summit of Canada.)	Nova Scotia	Cape Breton Island	535 m 1,755 ft	535 m 1,755 ft	151.6 km 94.2 mi	46.7022°N 60.5989°W
39	Mount Crysdale	British Columbia	Misinchinka Ranges	2429 m 7,969 ft	1554 m 5,098 ft	147.3 km 91.5 mi	55.9383°N 123.4210°W
40	Qiajivik Mountain	Nunavut	Baffin Island	1905 m 6,250 ft	1729 m 5,673 ft	143.8 km 89.3 mi	72.1809°N 75.9090°W
41	Mount Assiniboine (Note: Mount Assiniboine is the southernmost and easternmost summit of its elevation in Canada.)	Alberta; British Columbia	Canadian Rockies	3616 m 11,864 ft	2082 m 6,831 ft	141.8 km 88.1 mi	50.8696°N 115.6509°W
42	McBeth-Inugsuin Peak (Peak 39-18)	Nunavut	Baffin Island	1721 m 5,646 ft	1564 m 5,131 ft	138.5 km 86.1 mi	69.6524°N 69.3059°W
43	Simpson Peak	British Columbia	Stikine Plateau	2170 m 7,119 ft	985 m 3,232 ft	136.6 km 84.9 mi	59.7234°N 131.4480°W
44	Devils Paw (Note: The summit of Devils Paw is the highest point of the Juneau Icefield.)	Alaska; British Columbia	Coast Mountains	2593 m 8,507 ft	1703 m 5,587 ft	136.3 km 84.7 mi	58.7289°N 133.8402°W
45	Mount Carleton (Note: The summit of Mount Carleton is the highest point of the Canadian Province of New Brunswick.)	New Brunswick	Notre Dame Mountains	820 m 2,690 ft	625 m 2,051 ft	134.7 km 83.7 mi	47.3780°N 66.8761°W
46	Golden Hinde (Note: The summit of Golden Hinde is the highest point of Vancouver Island.)	British Columbia	Vancouver Island	2197 m 7,208 ft	2197 m 7,208 ft	134.3 km 83.4 mi	49.6627°N 125.7470°W
47	Mount Jancowski	British Columbia	Coast Mountains	2729 m 8,953 ft	2079 m 6,821 ft	124 km 77.1 mi	56.3372°N 129.9817°W
48	Shedin Peak (Note: The summit of Shedin Peak is the highest point of the Skeena Mountains.)	British Columbia	Skeena Mountains	2588 m 8,491 ft	1798 m 5,899 ft	118.2 km 73.4 mi	55.9392°N 127.4799°W
49	Man O'War Peak (Note: The summit of Man O'War Peak is the highest point of the Kiglapait Mountains.)	Newfoundland and Labrador	Kiglapait Mountains	1050 m 3,445 ft	974 m 3,196 ft	103.9 km 64.6 mi	56.9686°N 61.6692°W
50	Thudaka Mountain (Note: The summit of Thudaka Mountain is the highest point of Cassiar Mountains.)	British Columbia	Cassiar Mountains	2748 m 9,016 ft	1739 m 5,705 ft	103.5 km 64.3 mi	57.9272°N 126.8485°W
51	Gros Morne (Note: Gros Morne is the easternmost 500-meter (1640-foot) summit of Canada.)	Newfoundland and Labrador	Island of Newfoundland	806 m 2,644 ft	693 m 2,272 ft	98.8 km 61.4 mi	49.5942°N 57.7838°W
52	Sharktooth Mountain	British Columbia	Cassiar Mountains	2668 m 8,753 ft	1653 m 5,423 ft	98.4 km 61.2 mi	58.5876°N 127.9625°W
53	Brave Mountain (Note: The summit of Brave Mountain is the highest point of the Kaumajet Mountains.) (Note: Brave Mountain is the easternmost summit of its elevation in Canada.)	Newfoundland and Labrador	Kaumajet Mountains	1234 m 4,050 ft	1219 m 3,999 ft	90.4 km 56.1 mi	57.8814°N 62.0263°W
54	Mount Sir Alexander (Note: Mount Sir Alexander is the northernmost and westernmost 3000-meter (9843-foot) summit and ultra-prominent summit of the Rocky Mountains.)	British Columbia	Canadian Rockies	3275 m 10,745 ft	1762 m 5,781 ft	87.8 km 54.5 mi	53.9360°N 120.3869°W
55	Dunn Peak (Note: The summit of Dunn Peak is the highest point of the Shuswap Highland.)	British Columbia	Columbia Mountains	2636 m 8,648 ft	1531 m 5,023 ft	87.1 km 54.1 mi	51.4372°N 119.9546°W
56	Sentinel Peak (Note: The summit of Sentinel Peak is the highest point of the Murray Range.) (Note: Sentinel Peak is the northernmost and westernmost 2000-meter (6562-foot) summit of the Rocky Mountains.)	British Columbia	Canadian Rockies	2513 m 8,245 ft	1452 m 4,764 ft	86.6 km 53.8 mi	54.9080°N 121.9610°W
57	Touak Peak (Note: Touak Peak is the easternmost summit of its elevation in Canada.) (Peak 1840)	Nunavut	Baffin Island	1840 m 6,037 ft	1617 m 5,305 ft	84.9 km 52.8 mi	66.1519°N 63.4918°W
58	Tsaydaychuz Peak	British Columbia	Coast Mountains	2758 m 9,049 ft	1826 m 5,991 ft	82.8 km 51.4 mi	53.0212°N 126.6401°W
59	Mount Porsild	Yukon	Coast Mountains	2545 m 8,350 ft	1655 m 5,430 ft	82 km 51 mi	60.0840°N 136.0154°W
60	Mont Saint-Pierre (Note: The summit of Mont Saint-Pierre is the highest point of the central Notre Dame Mountains.)	Quebec	Notre Dame Mountains	906 m 2,972 ft	716 m 2,347 ft	75.1 km 46.6 mi	48.4189°N 67.7988°W
61	Mount Sylvia	British Columbia	Muskwa Ranges	2940 m 9,646 ft	1559 m 5,115 ft	73.8 km 45.9 mi	58.0820°N 124.4688°W
62	Angna Mountain (Note: Angna Mountain is the easternmost ultra-prominent summit of Canada.)	Nunavut	Baffin Island	1710 m 5,610 ft	1510 m 4,954 ft	73.7 km 45.8 mi	66.5595°N 62.0273°W
63	Mount Farnham (Note: The summit of Mount Farnham is the highest point of the Purcell Mountains.) (Note: Mount Farnham is the southernmost summit of its elevation in Canada.)	British Columbia	Columbia Mountains	3493 m 11,460 ft	2123 m 6,965 ft	72.7 km 45.2 mi	50.4888°N 116.4871°W
64	Monarch Mountain (Note: The summit of Monarch Mountain is the highest point of the Monarch Icefield.)	British Columbia	Coast Mountains	3555 m 11,663 ft	2925 m 9,596 ft	71.4 km 44.4 mi	51.8995°N 125.8760°W
65	Whitecap Mountain (Note: The summit of Whitecap Mountain is the highest point of the Bendor Range.)	British Columbia	Coast Mountains	2918 m 9,573 ft	1533 m 5,030 ft	71.4 km 44.4 mi	50.7162°N 122.5085°W
66	Seven Sisters Peaks	British Columbia	Coast Mountains	2747 m 9,012 ft	1862 m 6,109 ft	68.8 km 42.7 mi	54.9678°N 128.2319°W
67	Alsek Peak	Yukon	Saint Elias Mountains	2740 m 8,990 ft	2025 m 6,644 ft	68.5 km 42.5 mi	60.0325°N 137.5915°W
68	Ferriston Peak	British Columbia	Omineca Mountains	2438 m 7,999 ft	1126 m 3,694 ft	67 km 41.6 mi	57.1089°N 125.9053°W
69	Mount Odin (Note: The summit of Mount Odin is the highest point of the Gold Range.)	British Columbia	Columbia Mountains	2971 m 9,747 ft	2409 m 7,904 ft	65.4 km 40.7 mi	50.5518°N 118.1293°W
70	Mount Goodsir (Note: The summit of Mount Goodsir is the highest point of the Ottertail Range.)	British Columbia	Canadian Rockies	3567 m 11,703 ft	1917 m 6,289 ft	64.1 km 39.8 mi	51.2021°N 116.3975°W
71	Wedge Mountain	British Columbia	Coast Mountains	2892 m 9,488 ft	2249 m 7,379 ft	63.9 km 39.7 mi	50.1330°N 122.7933°W
72	Mount Dawson	British Columbia	Columbia Mountains	3377 m 11,079 ft	2045 m 6,709 ft	63.4 km 39.4 mi	51.1516°N 117.4206°W
73	Mount Sir Sandford (Note: The summit of Mount Sir Sandford is the highest point of the Columbia Mountains.)	British Columbia	Columbia Mountains	3519 m 11,545 ft	2703 m 8,868 ft	62 km 38.5 mi	51.6566°N 117.8676°W
74	Mount Edziza	British Columbia	Coast Mountains	2793 m 9,163 ft	1763 m 5,784 ft	61.8 km 38.4 mi	57.7156°N 130.6345°W
75	Kootenay Mountain (Note: The summit of Kootenay Mountain is the highest point of the Nelson Range.)	British Columbia	Columbia Mountains	2456 m 8,058 ft	1801 m 5,909 ft	60 km 37.3 mi	49.2407°N 116.8226°W
76	Mount Tod	British Columbia	Thompson Plateau	2155 m 7,070 ft	1523 m 4,997 ft	57.9 km 36 mi	50.9166°N 119.9407°W
77	Chatsquot Mountain	British Columbia	Coast Mountains	2365 m 7,759 ft	1981 m 6,499 ft	57.7 km 35.8 mi	53.1422°N 127.4773°W
78	Scud Peak	British Columbia	Coast Mountains	2987 m 9,800 ft	2172 m 7,126 ft	57.4 km 35.7 mi	57.2412°N 131.1676°W
79	Atna Peak	British Columbia	Coast Mountains	2724 m 8,937 ft	1828 m 5,997 ft	56.8 km 35.3 mi	53.9398°N 128.0456°W
80	Pukeashun Mountain	British Columbia	Columbia Mountains	2301 m 7,549 ft	1696 m 5,564 ft	56.4 km 35.1 mi	51.2046°N 119.2353°W
81	Buckwell Peak	British Columbia; Yukon	Saint Elias Mountains	2721 m 8,927 ft	1971 m 6,467 ft	56.4 km 35 mi	59.4188°N 136.7653°W
82	Mount Buxton (Note: The summit of Mount Buxton is the highest point of Calvert Island.)	British Columbia	Calvert Island	1017 m 3,337 ft	1017 m 3,337 ft	56.3 km 35 mi	51.6000°N 127.9833°W
83	Mount Forrest	British Columbia	Omineca Mountains	2175 m 7,136 ft	1191 m 3,907 ft	55.3 km 34.3 mi	56.0242°N 124.9139°W
84	Whiting Peak	British Columbia	Coast Mountains	2524 m 8,281 ft	1669 m 5,476 ft	53.9 km 33.5 mi	58.1389°N 132.9346°W
85	Gladsheim Peak (Note: Gladsheim Peak is the southernmost summit of its elevation in Canada.)	British Columbia	Columbia Mountains	2830 m 9,285 ft	2056 m 6,745 ft	53.4 km 33.2 mi	49.7867°N 117.6272°W
86	Fleet Peak	British Columbia	Omineca Mountains	2337 m 7,667 ft	838 m 2,749 ft	52.8 km 32.8 mi	56.7802°N 126.2714°W
87	Mount Harrison (Note: Mount Harrison is the southernmost and easternmost 3000-meter (9843-foot) summit of Canada.)	British Columbia	Canadian Rockies	3360 m 11,024 ft	1770 m 5,807 ft	52.1 km 32.4 mi	50.0604°N 115.2057°W
88	Hubris Peak	British Columbia	Coast Mountains	2445 m 8,022 ft	1640 m 5,381 ft	51.9 km 32.2 mi	56.5518°N 130.9733°W
89	Mount Monashee (Note: The summit of Mount Monashee is the highest point of the Monashee Mountains.)	British Columbia	Columbia Mountains	3274 m 10,741 ft	2404 m 7,887 ft	51.8 km 32.2 mi	52.3853°N 118.9399°W
90	Mount Sir Wilfrid Laurier (Note: The summit of Mount Sir Wilfrid Laurier is the highest point of the Cariboo Mountains.)	British Columbia	Columbia Mountains	3516 m 11,535 ft	2728 m 8,950 ft	51.7 km 32.1 mi	52.8015°N 119.7315°W
91	Hudson Bay Mountain	British Columbia	Coast Mountains	2589 m 8,494 ft	1609 m 5,279 ft	51 km 31.7 mi	54.8116°N 127.3396°W
92	Mount Priestley	British Columbia	Coast Mountains	2366 m 7,762 ft	1945 m 6,381 ft	50.4 km 31.3 mi	55.2297°N 128.8759°W
93	Mount Valpy	British Columbia	Coast Mountains	2219 m 7,280 ft	2014 m 6,608 ft	49.4 km 30.7 mi	54.2750°N 129.0564°W
94	Mount Joffre (Note: Mount Joffre is the easternmost summit of its elevation in Canada.)	Alberta; British Columbia	Canadian Rockies	3433 m 11,263 ft	1505 m 4,938 ft	49.2 km 30.6 mi	50.5285°N 115.2069°W
95	Mount Forbes (Note: The summit of Mount Forbes is the highest point of the entire Hudson Bay drainage basin.) (Note: Mount Forbes is the easternmost summit of its elevation in Canada.)	Alberta	Canadian Rockies	3617 m 11,867 ft	1649 m 5,410 ft	47.4 km 29.5 mi	51.8600°N 116.9316°W
96	Mount Edith Cavell	Alberta	Canadian Rockies	3363 m 11,033 ft	2033 m 6,670 ft	47.2 km 29.3 mi	52.6672°N 118.0569°W
97	Pass Mountain (Note: The summit of Pass Mountain is the highest point of the Wernecke Mountains.)	Yukon	Mackenzie Mountains	2515 m 8,250 ft	1524 m 5,000 ft	46.9 km 29.1 mi	64.5140°N 133.6254°W
98	Vile Peak	British Columbia	Skeena Mountains	2189 m 7,182 ft	1551 m 5,089 ft	46.5 km 28.9 mi	56.2711°N 128.3401°W
99	Mount Queen Bess (Note: The summit of Mount Queen Bess is the highest point of the Homathko Icefield.)	British Columbia	Coast Mountains	3298 m 10,820 ft	2355 m 7,726 ft	45.5 km 28.2 mi	51.2714°N 124.5682°W
100	Mount Vancouver (Note: Mount Vancouver is the easternmost summit of its elevation in Canada.)	Yukon	Saint Elias Mountains	4812 m 15,787 ft	2712 m 8,898 ft	44 km 27.4 mi	60.3589°N 139.6980°W
101	Mount Thomlinson	British Columbia	Skeena Mountains	2451 m 8,041 ft	1661 m 5,449 ft	44 km 27.4 mi	55.5439°N 127.4864°W
102	Mount Lucania (Note: The summit of Mount Lucania is the highest point of the northern Saint Elias Mountains.) (Note: Mount Lucania is the northernmost summit of its elevation in Canada.)	Yukon	Saint Elias Mountains	5260 m 17,257 ft	3080 m 10,105 ft	43 km 26.7 mi	61.0215°N 140.4661°W
103	Chutine Peak	British Columbia	Coast Mountains	2903 m 9,524 ft	1758 m 5,768 ft	42.6 km 26.5 mi	57.7753°N 132.3346°W
104	Mount Cooper (Note: The summit of Mount Cooper is the highest point of the Goat Range.)	British Columbia	Columbia Mountains	3094 m 10,151 ft	2319 m 7,608 ft	42.5 km 26.4 mi	50.1797°N 117.1992°W
105	Kates Needle	Alaska; British Columbia	Coast Mountains	3053 m 10,016 ft	1383 m 4,537 ft	41.8 km 26 mi	57.0449°N 132.0451°W
106	Mount Saint Elias (Note: Mount Saint Elias is the second highest major summit of both Canada and the United States.)	Alaska; Yukon	Saint Elias Mountains	5489 m 18,009 ft	3429 m 11,250 ft	41.3 km 25.6 mi	60.2927°N 140.9307°W
107	Gribbel Peak (Note: The summit of Gribbel Peak is the highest point of Gribbell Island.)	British Columbia	Gribbell Island	1077 m 3,533 ft	1077 m 3,533 ft	40.4 km 25.1 mi	53.3833°N 128.9667°W
108	Peak 2233	British Columbia	Omineca Mountains	2233 m 7,326 ft	1153 m 3,783 ft	40.3 km 25 mi	57.1500°N 126.5500°W
109	Mount Cairnes	Yukon	Saint Elias Mountains	2820 m 9,252 ft	2000 m 6,562 ft	40.2 km 25 mi	60.8683°N 138.2764°W
110	Silverthrone Mountain (Note: The summit of Silverthrone Mountain is the highest point of the Ha-Iltzuk Icefield.)	British Columbia	Coast Mountains	2864 m 9,396 ft	974 m 3,196 ft	40.1 km 24.9 mi	51.5180°N 126.1133°W
111	Lehua Mountain	British Columbia	Coast Mountains	2469 m 8,100 ft	1659 m 5,443 ft	40 km 24.9 mi	56.4910°N 130.7710°W
112	Mount Henri	British Columbia	Omineca Mountains	2219 m 7,280 ft	1364 m 4,475 ft	39.9 km 24.8 mi	56.5093°N 124.7240°W
113	Sittakanay Peak (Bel Canto Peak)	British Columbia	Coast Mountains	2415 m 7,923 ft	1710 m 5,610 ft	38.9 km 24.1 mi	58.4786°N 133.3623°W
114	Mount Saugstad	British Columbia	Coast Mountains	2908 m 9,541 ft	1850 m 6,070 ft	38.6 km 24 mi	52.2542°N 126.5148°W
115	Kwatna Peak	British Columbia	Coast Mountains	2290 m 7,513 ft	2225 m 7,300 ft	36.9 km 22.9 mi	52.0706°N 126.9630°W
116	Razorback Mountain (Note: The summit of Razorback Mountain is the highest point of the Niut Range.)	British Columbia	Coast Mountains	3183 m 10,443 ft	2153 m 7,064 ft	36.5 km 22.7 mi	51.5905°N 124.6912°W
117	Mount La Pérouse (Note: The summit of Mount La Pérouse is the highest point of Graham Island.)	British Columbia	Graham Island	1127 m 3,698 ft	1127 m 3,698 ft	36.5 km 22.7 mi	53.2240°N 132.5110°W
118	Mount Clemenceau (Note: The summit of Mount Clemenceau is the highest point of the Clémenceau Icefield.)	British Columbia	Canadian Rockies	3664 m 12,021 ft	1494 m 4,902 ft	35.9 km 22.3 mi	52.2475°N 117.9578°W
119	Mount Judge Howay	British Columbia	Coast Mountains	2262 m 7,421 ft	1627 m 5,338 ft	35.7 km 22.2 mi	49.5072°N 122.3218°W
120	Oscar Peak	British Columbia	Coast Mountains	2336 m 7,664 ft	2099 m 6,886 ft	35.5 km 22 mi	54.9289°N 129.0594°W
121	Kaza Mountain	British Columbia	Columbia Mountains	2543 m 8,343 ft	1573 m 5,161 ft	35.5 km 22 mi	53.0711°N 121.0089°W
122	Howser Spire	British Columbia	Columbia Mountains	3412 m 11,194 ft	1299 m 4,262 ft	35.4 km 22 mi	50.7296°N 116.8134°W
122	Victoria Peak	British Columbia	Vancouver Island	2159 m 7,083 ft	1845 m 6,053 ft	35.4 km 22 mi	50.0547°N 126.1008°W
122	Mount Van der Est	British Columbia	Coast Mountains	1801 m 5,909 ft	1502 m 4,928 ft	35.4 km 22 mi	50.5565°N 125.2832°W
125	Gataga Peak	British Columbia	Muskwa Ranges	2533 m 8,310 ft	1515 m 4,970 ft	35.3 km 21.9 mi	58.0697°N 125.7010°W
126	Cond Peak (Note: The summit of Cond Peak is the highest point of the Kokanee Range.) (Note: Cond Peak is the southernmost summit of its elevation in Canada.)	British Columbia	Columbia Mountains	2801 m 9,190 ft	1720 m 5,643 ft	35.3 km 21.9 mi	49.7462°N 117.1419°W
127	Peak 08-46	Nunavut	Ellesmere Island	2181 m 7,156 ft	1745 m 5,725 ft	35.1 km 21.8 mi	80.1370°N 76.7763°W
128	Rugged Mountain	British Columbia	Vancouver Island	1861 m 6,106 ft	1571 m 5,154 ft	35.1 km 21.8 mi	50.0252°N 126.6778°W
129	Mount Tatlow	British Columbia	Coast Mountains	3063 m 10,049 ft	1613 m 5,292 ft	34.4 km 21.4 mi	51.3843°N 123.8641°W
130	Mount Hubbard	Alaska; Yukon	Saint Elias Mountains	4557 m 14,951 ft	2457 m 8,061 ft	34.4 km 21.3 mi	60.3194°N 139.0726°W
131	Hkusam Mountain	British Columbia	Vancouver Island	1645 m 5,397 ft	1508 m 4,948 ft	34.2 km 21.3 mi	50.3349°N 125.8407°W
132	Faisal Peak	British Columbia	Coast Mountains	2239 m 7,346 ft	1669 m 5,476 ft	34 km 21.1 mi	56.8857°N 130.5798°W
133	Chase Mountain	British Columbia	Omineca Mountains	2218 m 7,277 ft	1120 m 3,675 ft	33.9 km 21.1 mi	56.5691°N 125.2647°W
134	Mount Cronin	British Columbia	Skeena Mountains	2396 m 7,861 ft	1571 m 5,154 ft	33.3 km 20.7 mi	54.9301°N 126.8638°W
135	Kispiox Mountain	British Columbia	Skeena Mountains	2096 m 6,877 ft	1561 m 5,121 ft	33.1 km 20.6 mi	55.3985°N 127.9435°W
136	Dalton Peak	Yukon	Saint Elias Mountains	2329 m 7,641 ft	1549 m 5,082 ft	32.9 km 20.4 mi	60.4767°N 137.1728°W
137	Brian Boru Peak	British Columbia	Coast Mountains	2507 m 8,225 ft	1832 m 6,010 ft	32.8 km 20.4 mi	55.0739°N 127.5742°W
138	North Pinnacle (Note: The summit of North Pinnacle is the highest point of the Whatshan Range.)	British Columbia	Columbia Mountains	2573 m 8,442 ft	1667 m 5,469 ft	31.8 km 19.74 mi	50.1953°N 118.2290°W
139	Monmouth Mountain (Note: The summit of Monmouth Mountain is the highest point of the Lillooet Icefield.) (Mount Monmouth)	British Columbia	Coast Mountains	3182 m 10,440 ft	1602 m 5,256 ft	31.6 km 19.6 mi	50.9924°N 123.7900°W
140	Good Hope Mountain (Note: The summit of Good Hope Mountain is the highest point of the Bugaboos.)	British Columbia	Coast Mountains	3242 m 10,636 ft	1497 m 4,911 ft	31.2 km 19.38 mi	51.1425°N 124.1719°W
141	Mount Brazeau	Alberta	Canadian Rockies	3525 m 11,565 ft	1475 m 4,839 ft	30.8 km 19.14 mi	52.5515°N 117.3549°W
142	Mount Chown (Note: Mount Chown is the northernmost and westernmost summit of its elevation in the Rocky Mountains.)	Alberta	Canadian Rockies	3316 m 10,879 ft	1746 m 5,728 ft	30.7 km 19.05 mi	53.3971°N 119.4173°W
143	Morton Peak	British Columbia	Columbia Mountains	2250 m 7,382 ft	1695 m 5,561 ft	30.5 km 18.94 mi	50.7653°N 118.8430°W
144	Mount Irish	British Columbia	Omineca Mountains	2280 m 7,480 ft	1170 m 3,839 ft	29.5 km 18.31 mi	57.3875°N 125.9664°W
145	Mount Monkley	British Columbia	Coast Mountains	1967 m 6,453 ft	1529 m 5,016 ft	29.3 km 18.23 mi	54.8914°N 129.6477°W
146	Corsan Peak	British Columbia	Coast Mountains	1934 m 6,345 ft	1609 m 5,279 ft	28.4 km 17.64 mi	51.0175°N 126.4058°W
147	Canoona Peak (Note: The summit of Canoona Peak is the highest point of Princess Royal Island.)	British Columbia	Princess Royal Island	1104 m 3,622 ft	1104 m 3,622 ft	27.9 km 17.31 mi	53.0048°N 128.5904°W
148	Mount Lester Jones	British Columbia	Coast Mountains	2408 m 7,900 ft	1658 m 5,440 ft	27.7 km 17.21 mi	58.7174°N 133.2306°W
149	Thunder Mountain	British Columbia	Coast Mountains	2664 m 8,740 ft	1694 m 5,558 ft	27.6 km 17.14 mi	52.5531°N 126.3698°W
150	Mount Aylesworth	Alaska; British Columbia	Saint Elias Mountains	2830 m 9,285 ft	1420 m 4,659 ft	27.1 km 16.81 mi	59.9242°N 138.7985°W

== Gallery ==
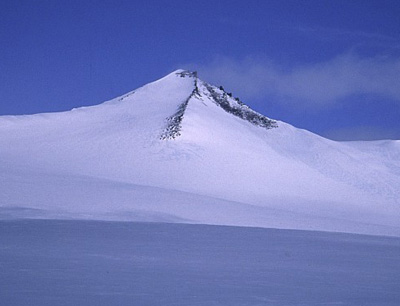
1. Barbeau Peak is the highest summit of Ellesmere Island and Nunavut.

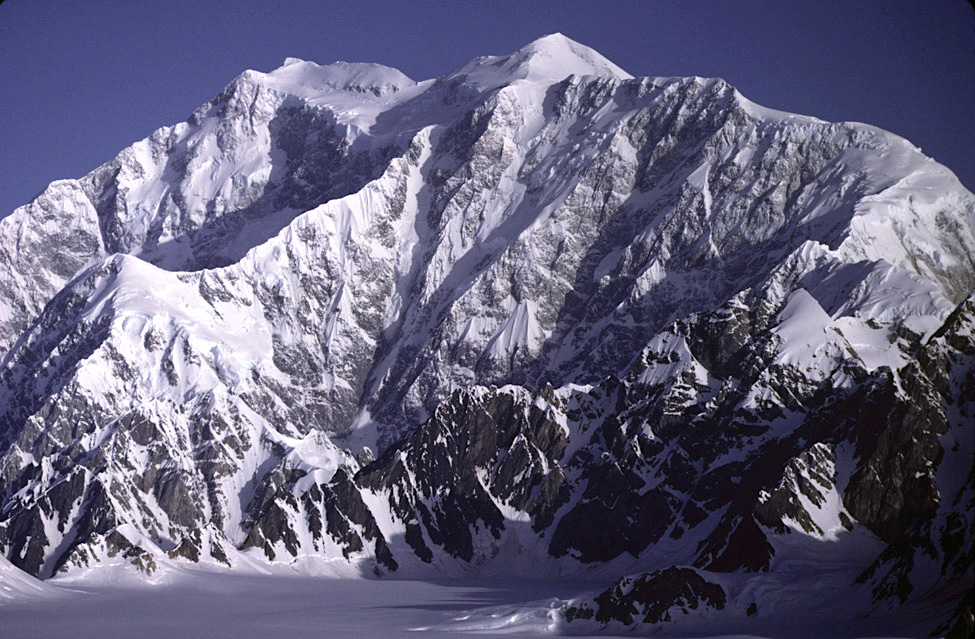
5. Mount Logan in Yukon is the highest summit of Canada.

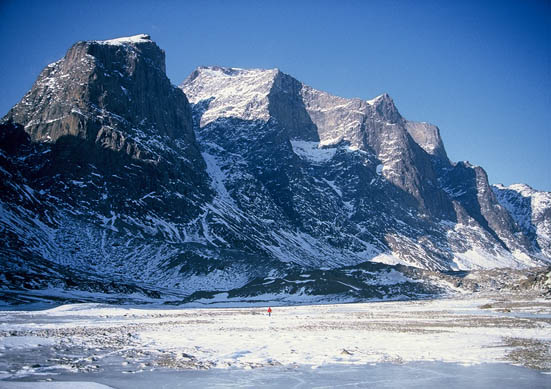
7. Mount Odin is the highest summit of Baffin Island.

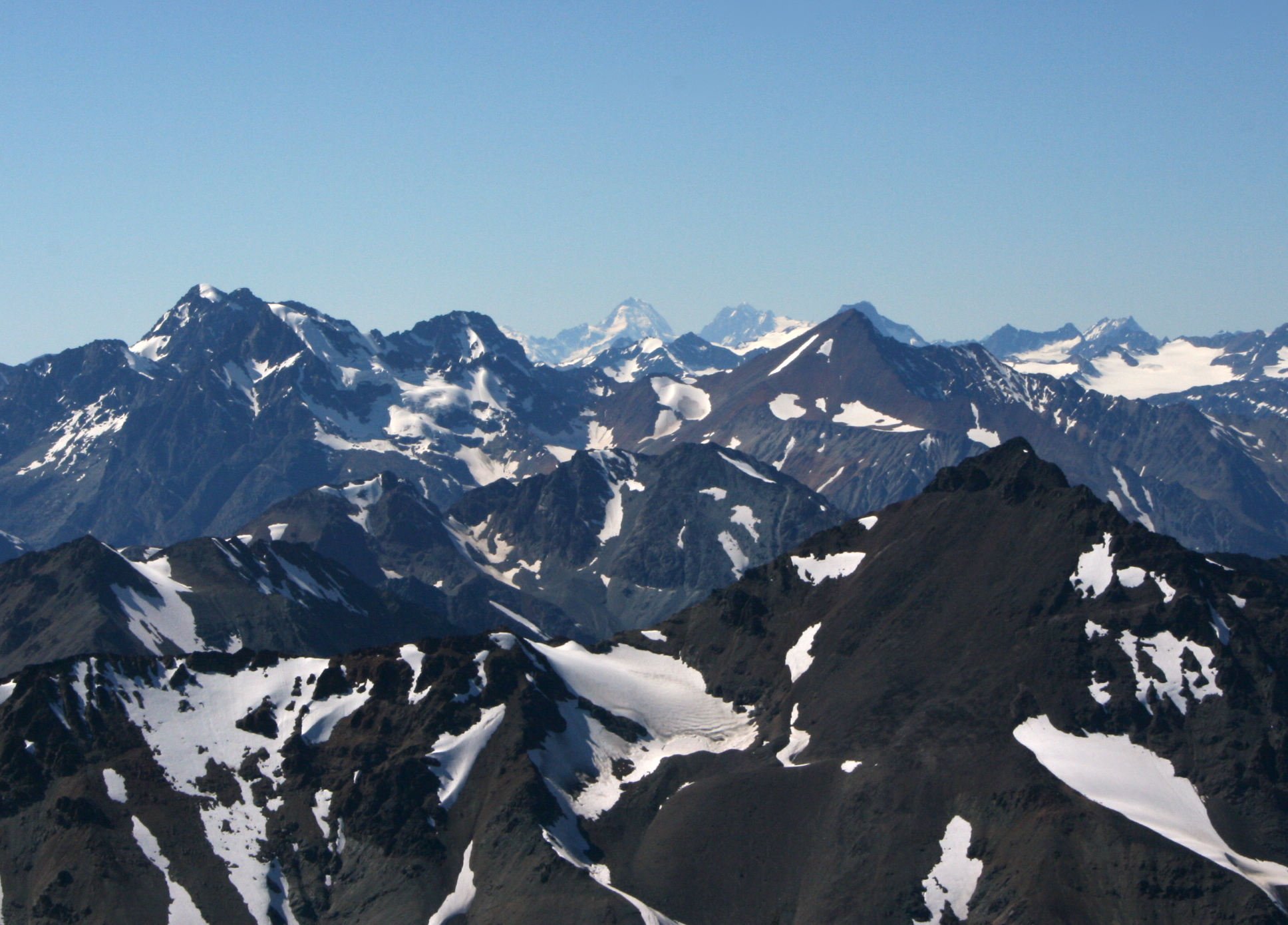
8. Mount Waddington is the highest summit of the Coast Mountains of British Columbia.

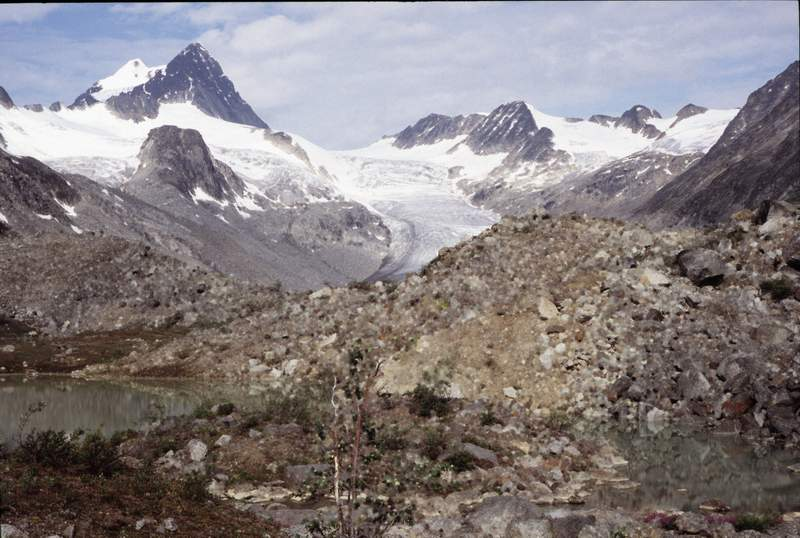
10. Keele Peak is the highest summit of the Mackenzie Mountains of Yukon.

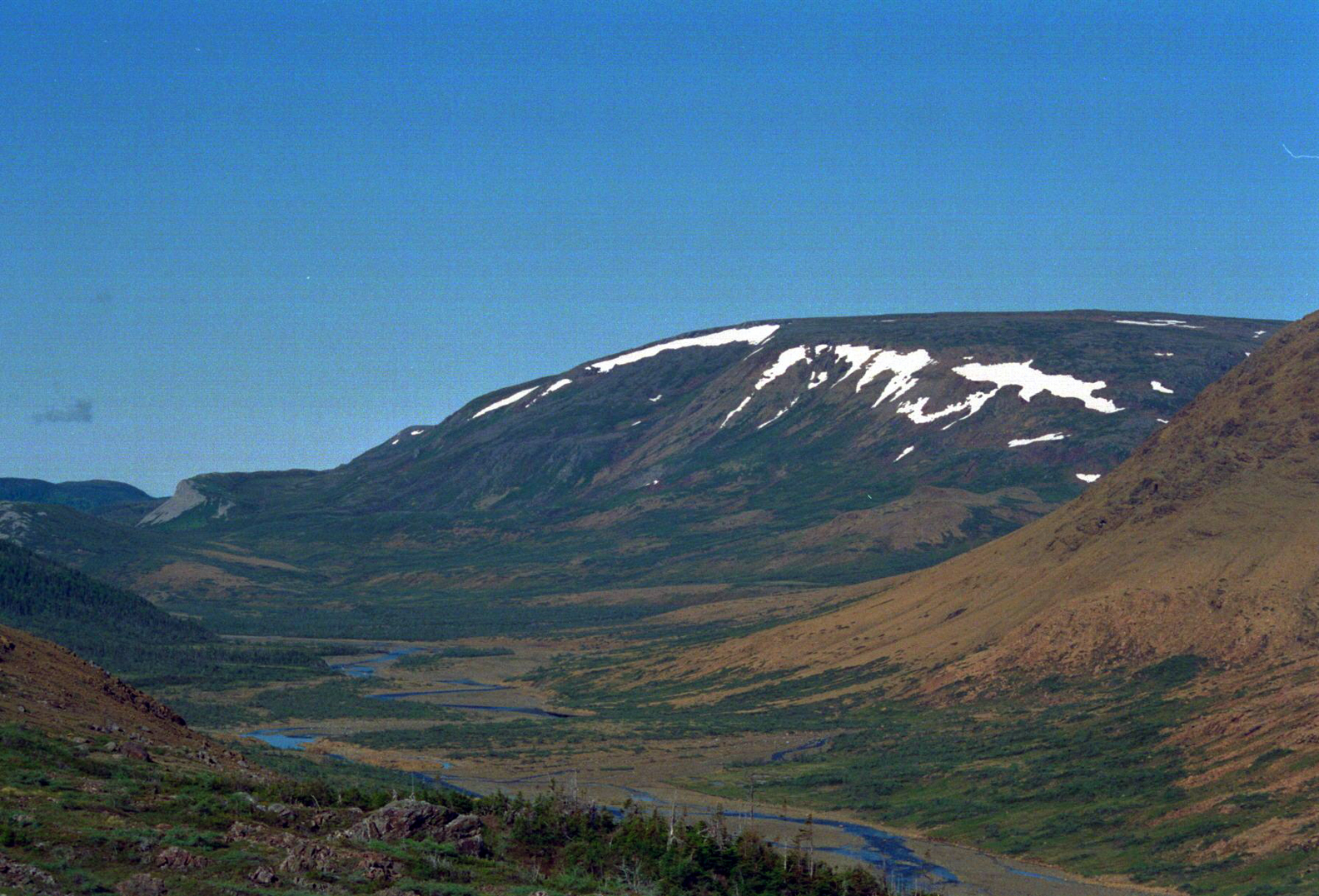
12. The Cabox is the highest summit of Newfoundland.

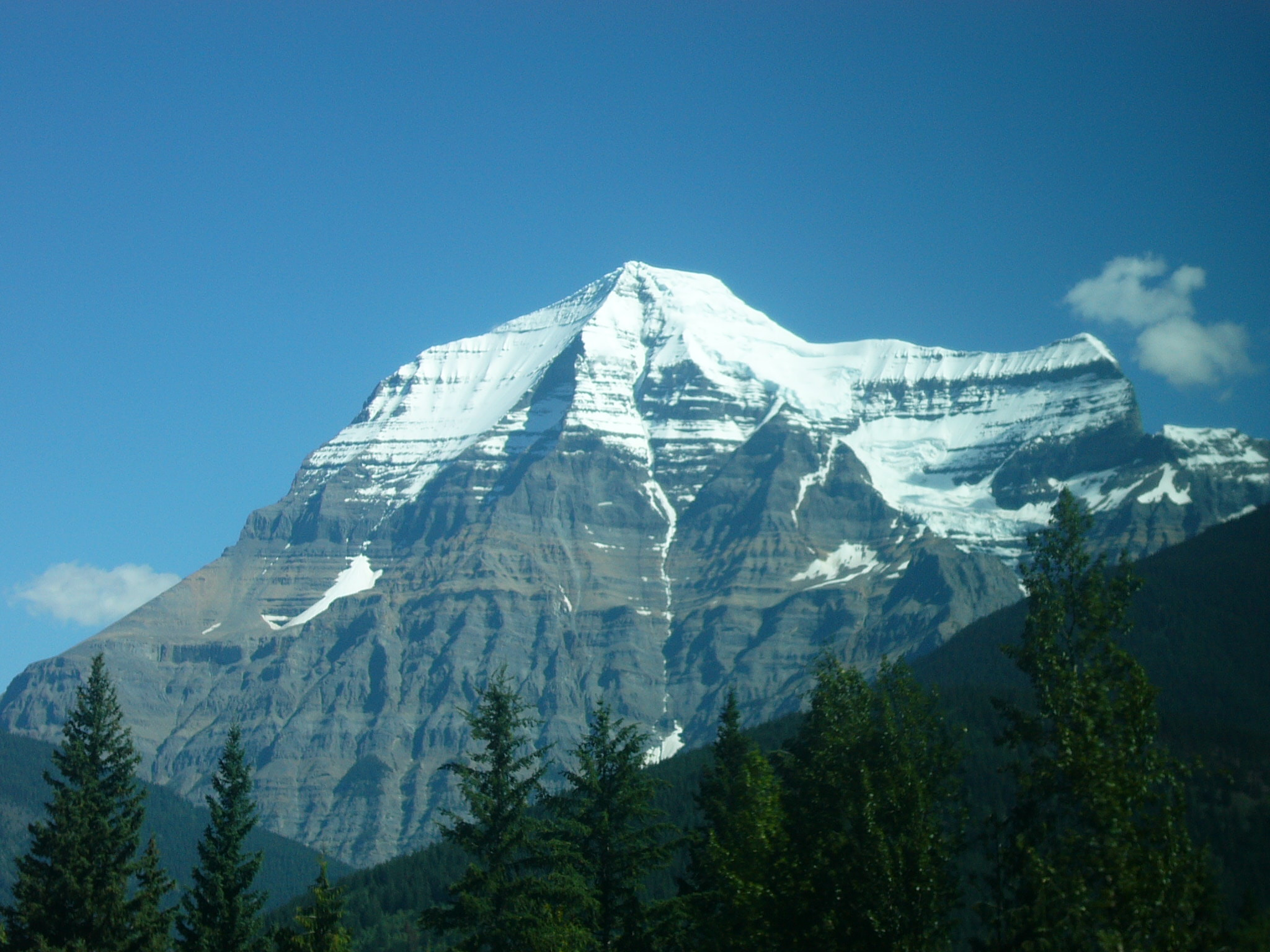
14. Mount Robson in British Columbia is the highest summit of the Canadian Rockies.

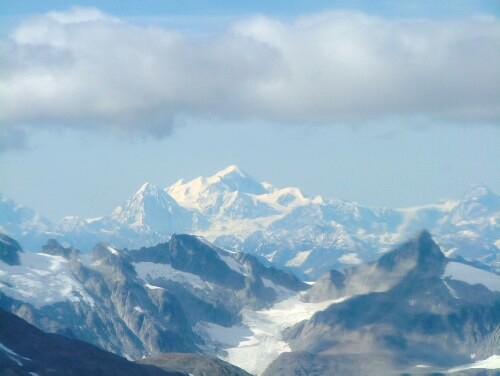
31. Mount Fairweather on the Alaska border is the highest summit of British Columbia.

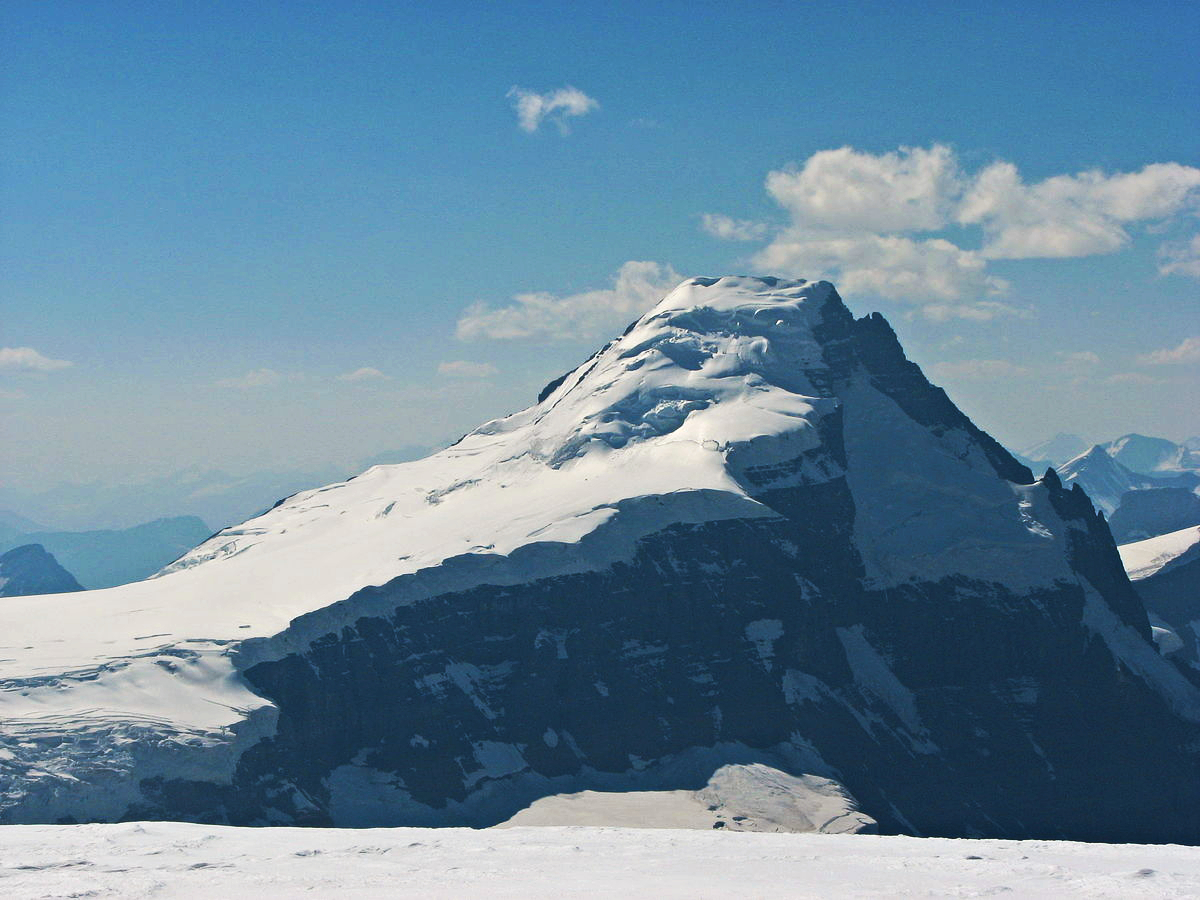
36. Mount Columbia on the British Columbia border is the highest summit of Alberta.

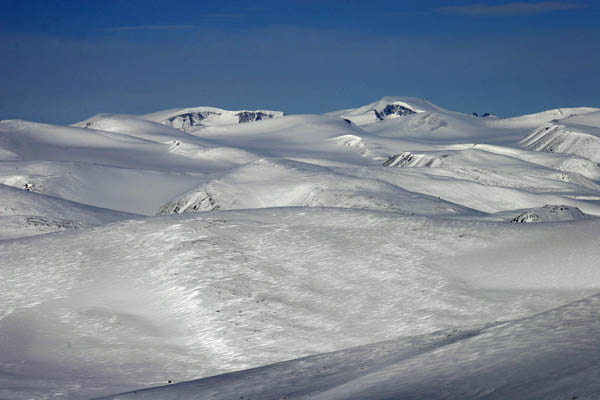
40. Qiajivik Mountain is the highest summit of northern Baffin Island.

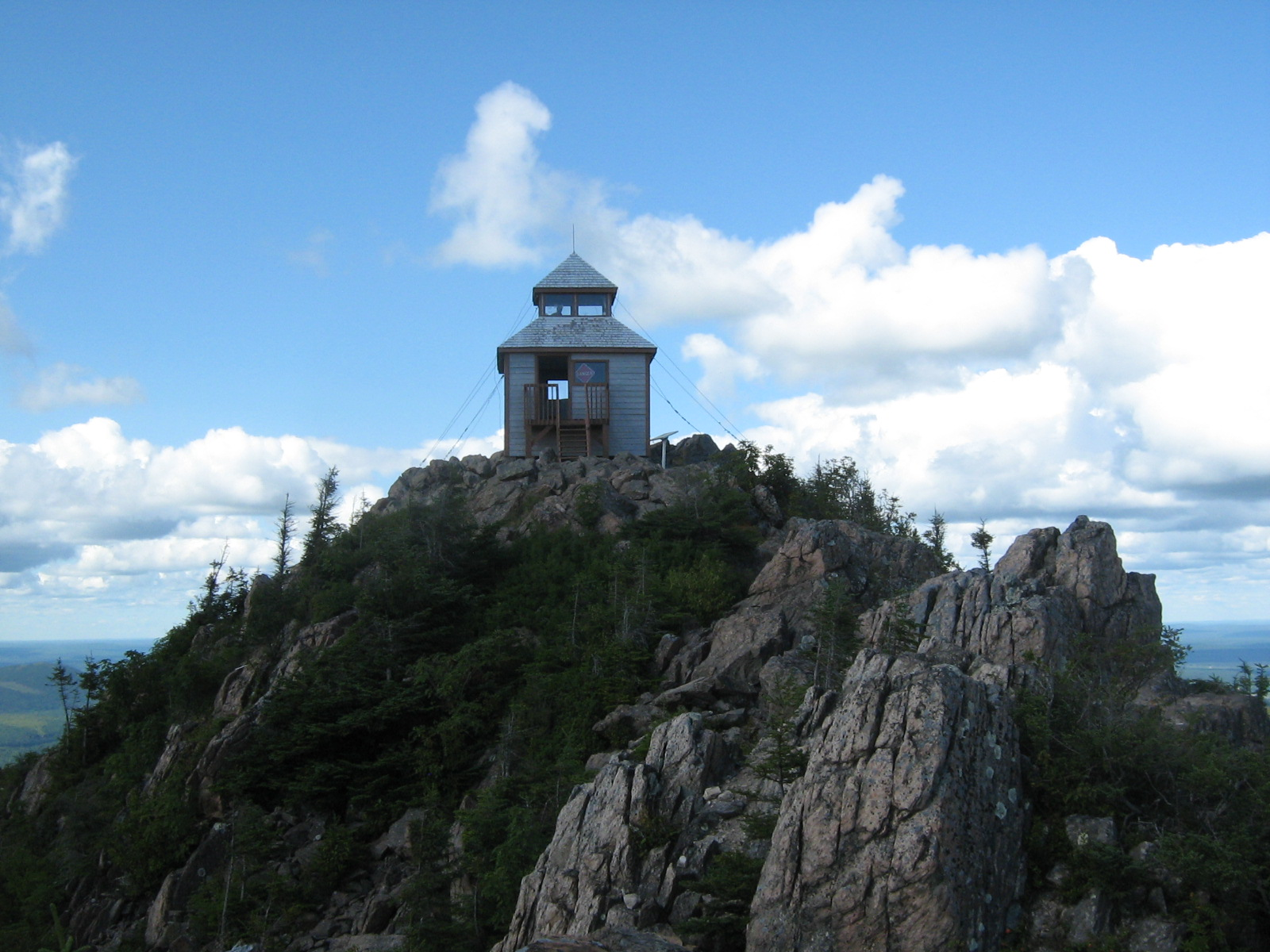
45. Mount Carleton is the highest summit of New Brunswick.

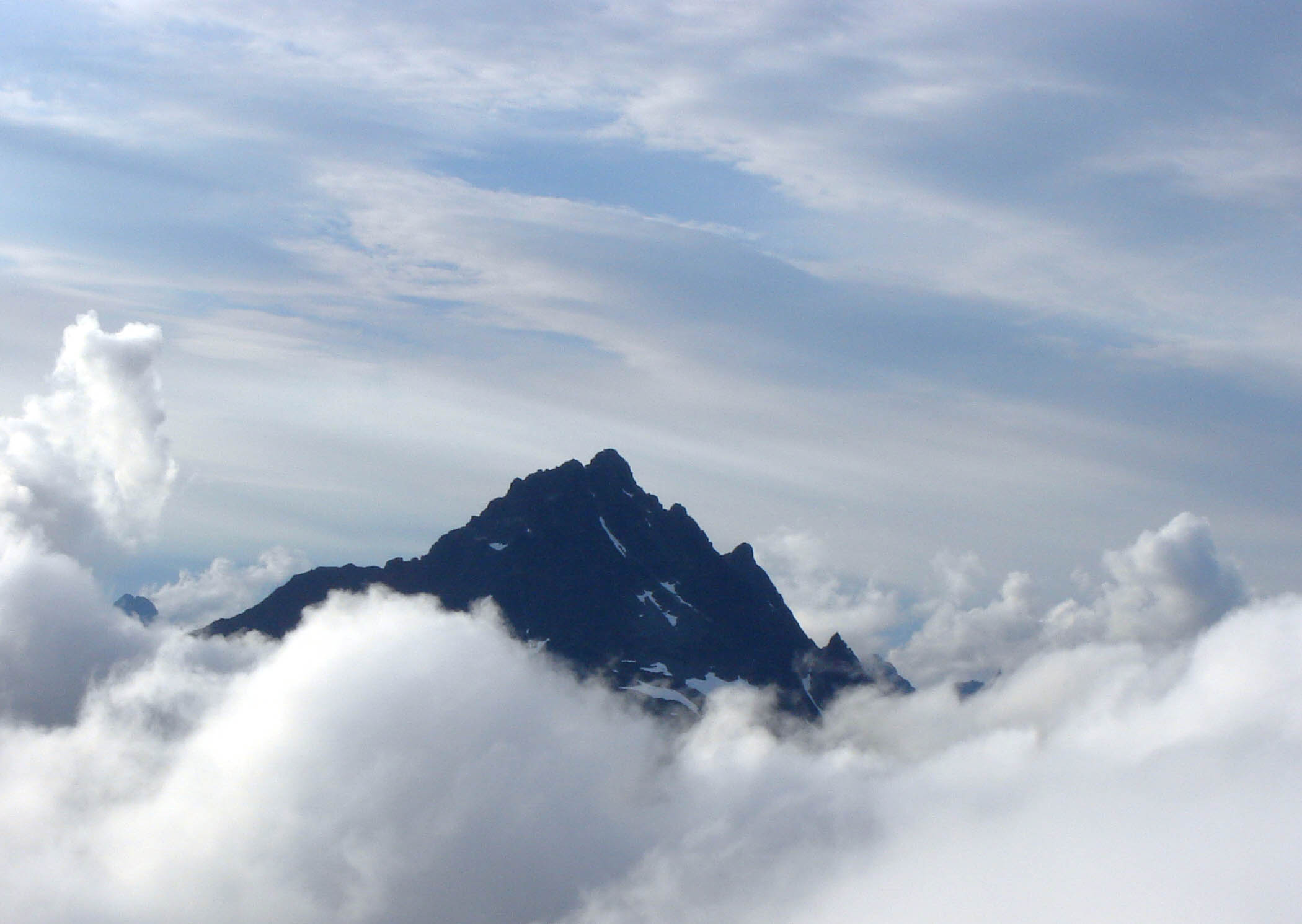
46. The Golden Hinde is the highest summit of Vancouver Island.

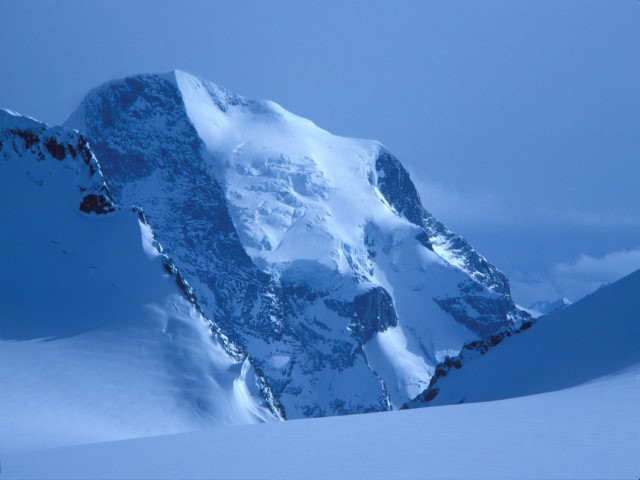
73. Mount Sir Sandford is the highest summit of the Sir Sandford Range of British Columbia.

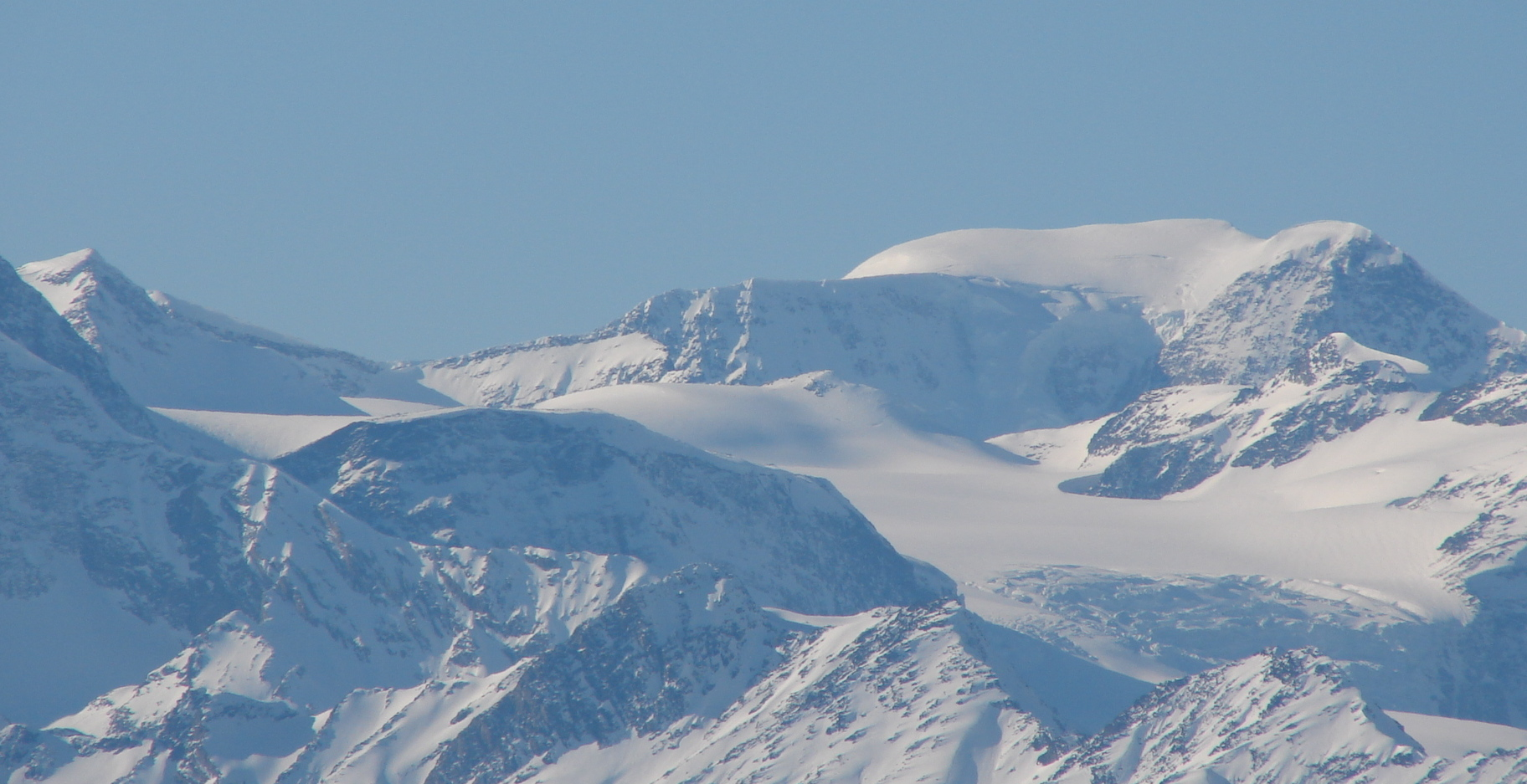
90. Mount Sir Wilfrid Laurier is the highest summit of the Cariboo Mountains of British Columbia.

== See also ==
- List of mountain peaks of North America
  - List of mountain peaks of Greenland
  - List of mountain peaks of Canada
    - List of the highest major summits of Canada
      - List of the major 4000-metre summits of Canada
      - List of the major 3000-metre summits of Canada
    - List of the most prominent summits of Canada
      - List of the ultra-prominent summits of Canada
    - List of the most isolated major summits of Canada
    - List of extreme summits of Canada
  - List of mountain peaks of the Rocky Mountains
  - List of mountain peaks of the United States
  - List of mountain peaks of México
  - List of mountain peaks of Central America
  - List of mountain peaks of the Caribbean
- Canada
  - Geography of Canada
    - Category:Mountains of Canada
      - commons:Category:Mountains of Canada
- Physical geography
  - Topography
    - Topographic elevation
    - Topographic prominence
    - Topographic isolation
