= Mount Macdonald (Yukon) =

Mountain in Yukon, Canada

- Location within Yukon Location within Canada

Highest point
- Elevation: 2,760 m (9,060 ft)
- Prominence: 1,560 m (5,120 ft)
- Coordinates: 64°43′32″N 132°46′41″W

Geography
- Location: Mackenzie Mountains, Yukon Territory, Canada
- Parent range: Mackenzie Mountains

Climbing
- Easiest route: Scramble

Mount Macdonald (2,760 metres (9,060 ft) is the highest peak in the Northwest Mackenzie Mountains of Yukon Territory, Canada. Located in a very remote section of the Yukon, Mount Macdonald is the tallest peak for 187 kilometres (116 mi).

== See also ==
- List of the most isolated major summits of Canada
- List of extreme summits of Canada
