= Long Range Mountains =

Mountain range in western Newfoundland, Canada

- Mekapiisk (Mi'kmaq)
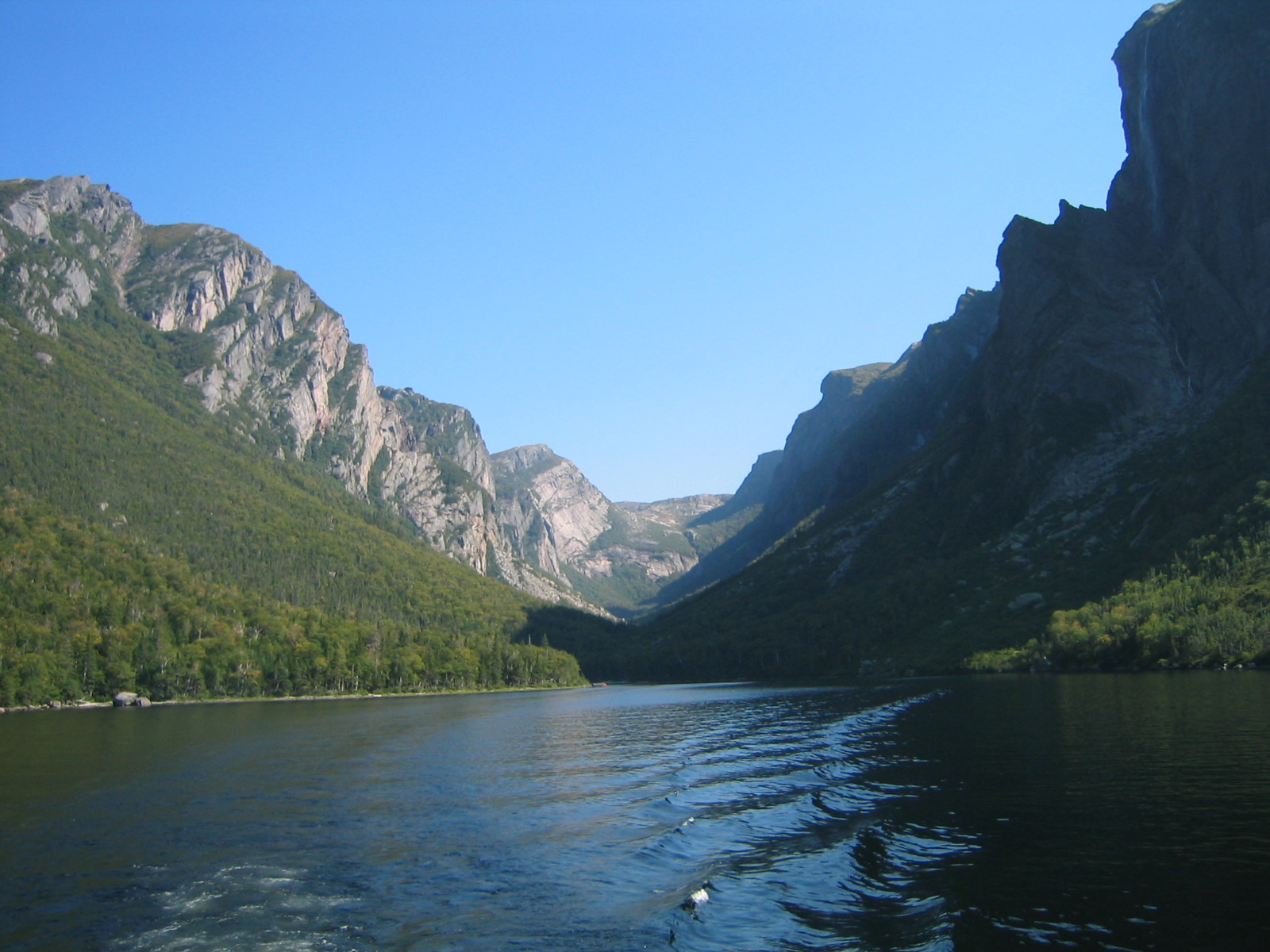
- Western Brook Pond, a fjord in the Long Range Mountains. (Gros Morne National Park, Newfoundland)

Highest point
- Peak: The Cabox
- Elevation: 812 m (2,664 ft)
- Coordinates: 48°49′59″N 58°29′03″W

Geography
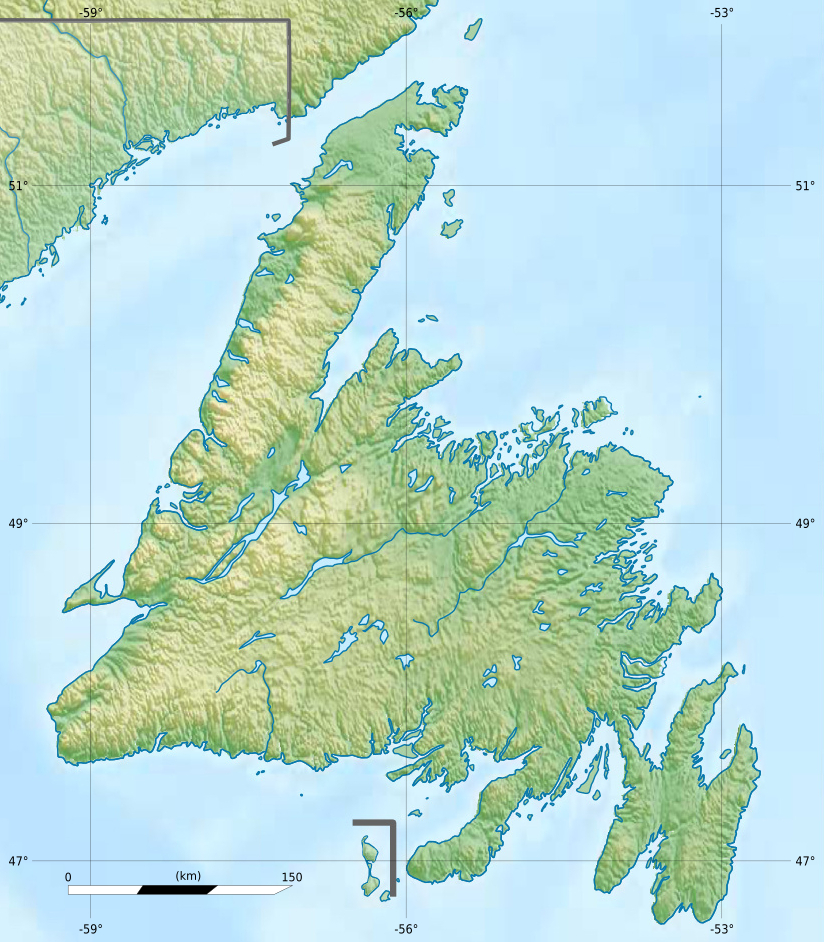
- Location within Newfoundland
- Country: Canada
- Province: Newfoundland and Labrador
- Range coordinates: 49°19′30″N 57°48′15″W
- Parent range: Appalachian Mountains

The Long Range Mountains are a series of mountains along the west coast of the Canadian island of Newfoundland. The Long Range Mountains are a subrange which forms the northernmost section of the Appalachian mountain chain on the eastern seaboard of North America.

In 2003 it was announced that the International Appalachian Trail would be extended through the Long Range Mountains. A portion of the trail opened in 2006.

== Description ==
The Great Northern Peninsula of Western Newfoundland contains the Highlands, the largest external basement massif of the Grenville Orogeny in the Appalachian Orogen. This Precambrian basement is known as the Long Range Inlier, Long Range Complex or Basement Gneiss Complex, consisting of quartz-feldspar gneisses and granites that are up to 1,550 million years in age. The Long Range dikes are mafic in composition and have an age of about 605 million years.

Running along the Gulf of St. Lawrence, the range includes the following sections:

- Anguille Mountains,
- Lewis Hills,
- Tablelands (a section of the Earth's mantle exposed at the surface)
- main section of the Long Range Mountains (running northeast from the Tablelands through Gros Morne National Park)

== Highest peaks ==
Rank	Name	m	ft
1	The Cabox	812	2671
2	Gros Morne	807	2644
3	Blue Mountain	800	2625
4	Big Level	795	2608
5	Round Hill	763	2653
6	Rocky Harbour Hill	756	2480
7	Mount Saint Gregory	686	2251
8	Gros Paté	673	2208
9	Big Hill	659	2162
10	Old Crow	649	2129

== Gallery ==
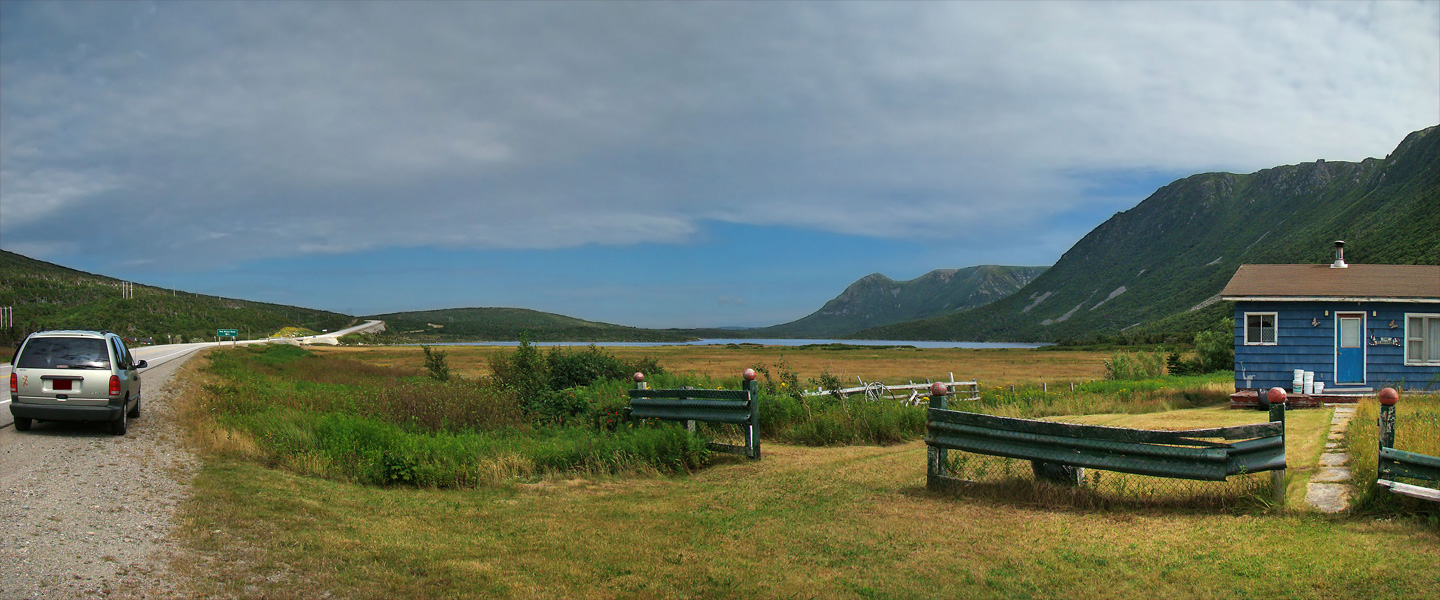
Table Mountain (518 m [1,699 ft]) along the Trans-Canada Highway

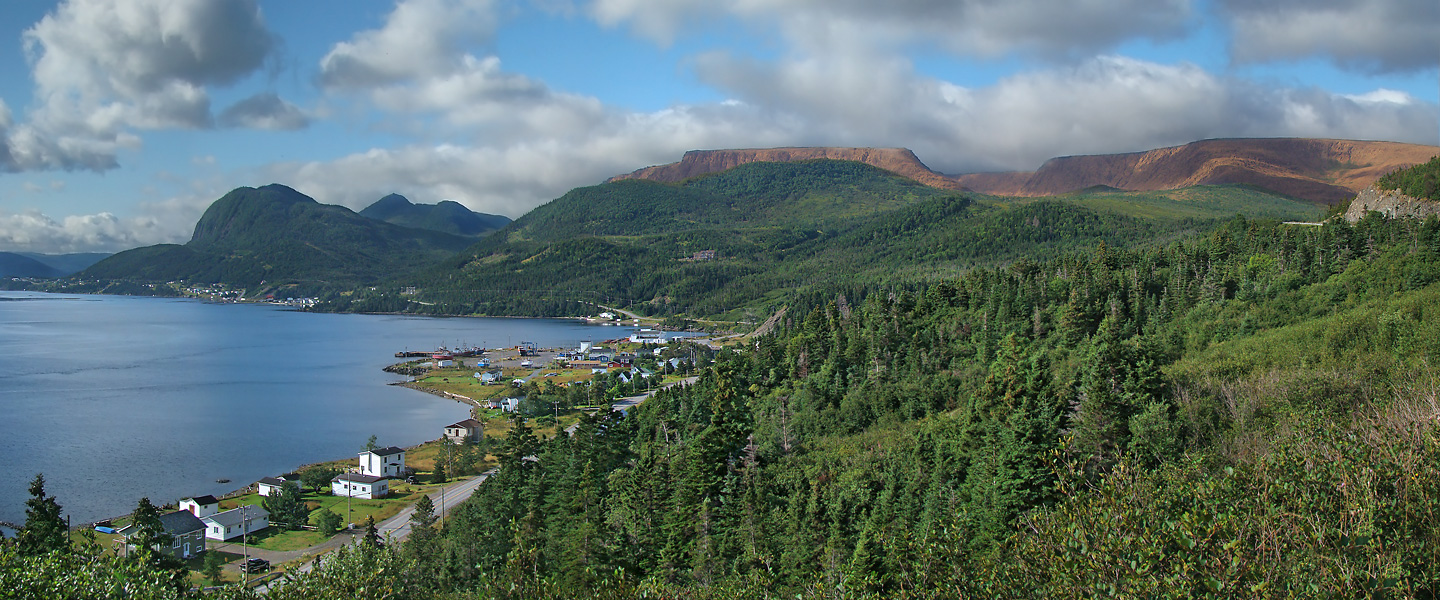
The Long Range Mountains in Gros Morne National Park

== See also ==
- Avalonia
- List of subranges of the Appalachian Mountains
