= Gros Morne (Newfoundland) =

Mountain in western Newfoundland

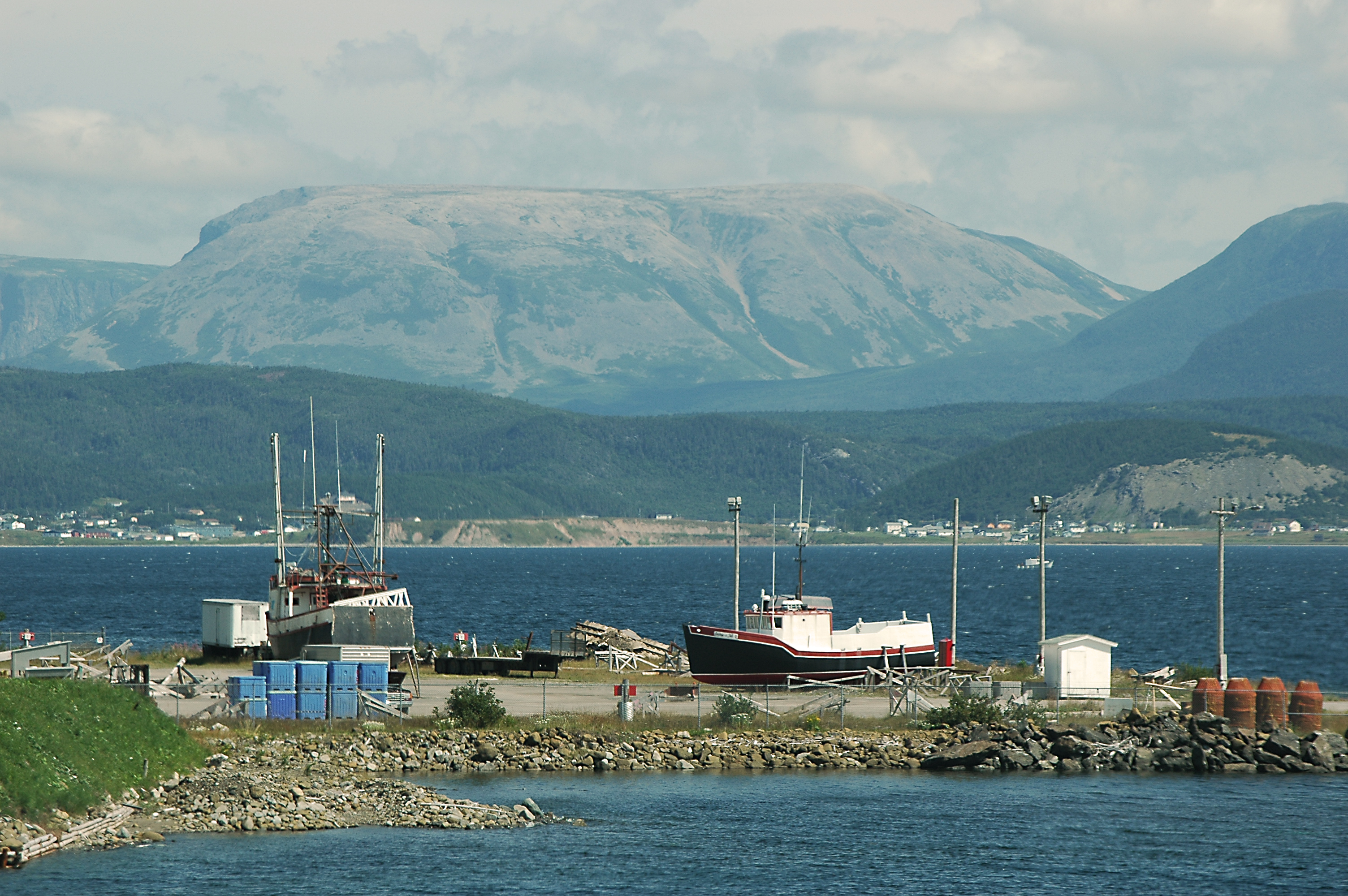
- Gros Morne in 2007

Highest point
- Elevation: 806 m (2,644 ft)
- Prominence: 707 m (2,320 ft)
- Coordinates: 49°35′37″N 57°47′01″W

Geography
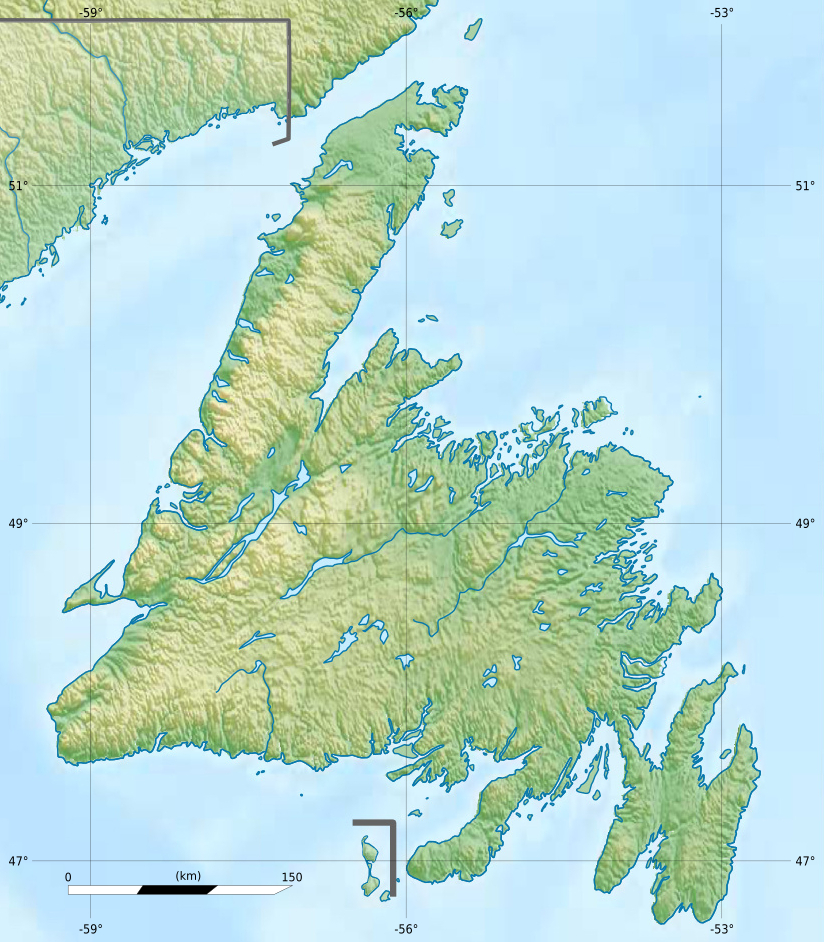
- Location within Newfoundland
- Location: Newfoundland, Canada
- Parent range: Long Range Mountains
- Topo map: NTS 12H12 Gros Morne

Climbing
- Easiest route: class 3 scramble

Gros Morne is a mountain located in western Newfoundland, near the coastal community of Rocky Harbour in Gros Morne National Park. At 806 m (2,644 ft) high, it is the second highest peak on Newfoundland, exceeded only by The Cabox.

== Description ==
Gros Morne has a weathered rock dome summit consisting of quartzite.

== Fauna ==
Gros Morne hosts multiple alpine species like rock ptarmigan, arctic hare, and caribou.

== Access ==
Gros Morne is accessible via the James Callaghan Trail, a 17km hiking path named for British Prime minister James Callaghan. The trail was established in 1977. The summit portion of trail closes between May 1 and June 28 for wildlife protection.

== See also ==
- Mountain peaks of Canada
