= Cond Peak =

Mountain in the country of Canada

- Location within British Columbia Location within Canada
- Interactive map of Cond Peak

Highest point
- Elevation: 2,801 m (9,190 ft)
- Prominence: 1,720 m (5,640 ft)
- Listing: Mountains of British Columbia
- Coordinates: 49°44′46″N 117°8′31″W

Geography
- Location: British Columbia, Canada
- District: Kootenay Land District
- Parent range: Columbia Mountains
- Topo map: NTS 82F11 Kokanee Peak

Cond Peak is a mountain summit located in the Columbia Mountains of British Columbia, Canada. The mountain was named for Lieutenant Frederick Thomas Piercy Cond, who served in the Royal Naval Reserve during World War I.
