= The Cabox =

Highest mountain on Newfoundland, Canada

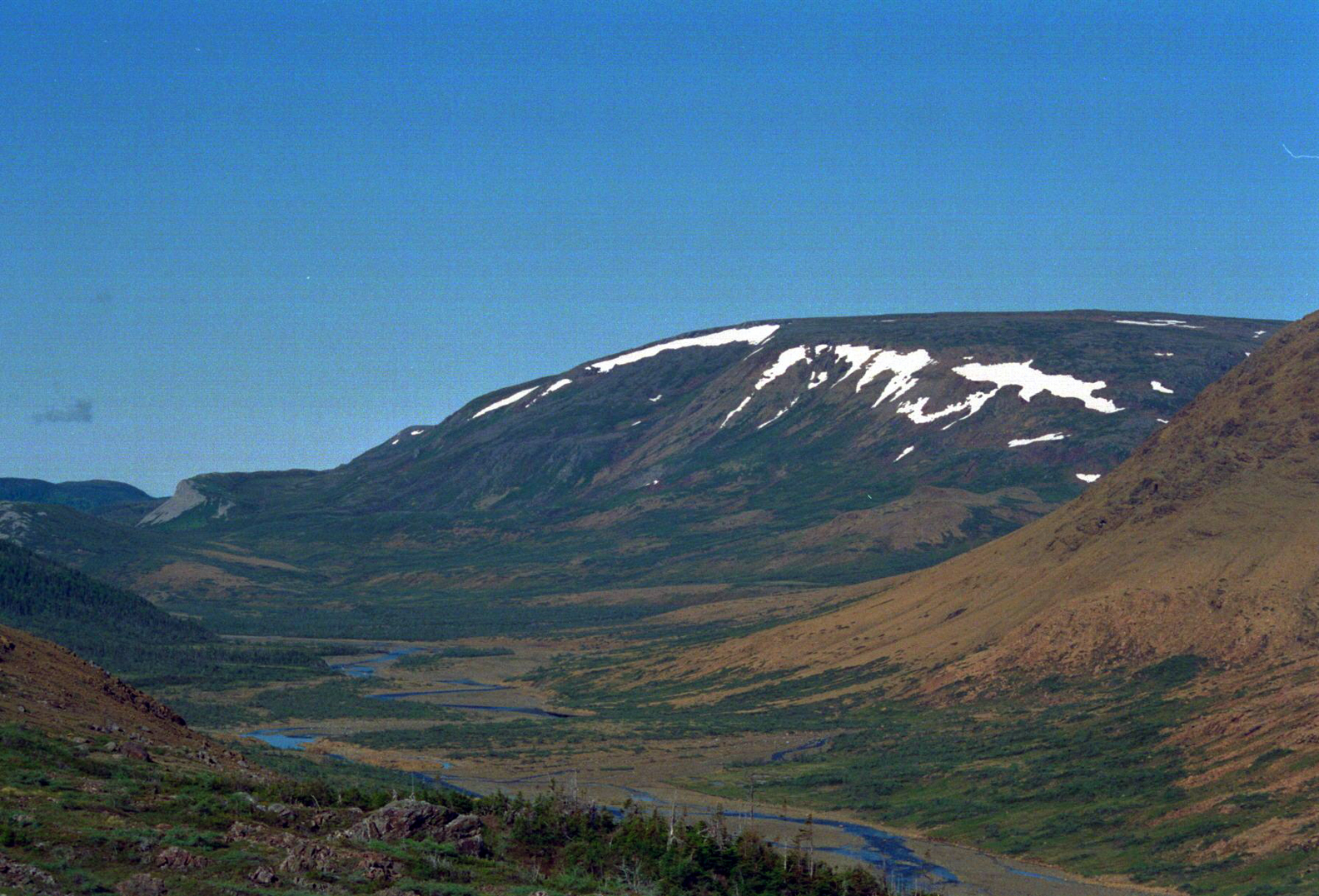

Highest point
- Elevation: 812 m (2,664 ft)
- Prominence: 812 m (2,664 ft)
- Listing: North America isolated peaks 32nd; Canada most isolated peaks 12th
- Coordinates: 48°49′59″N 58°29′03″W

Geography
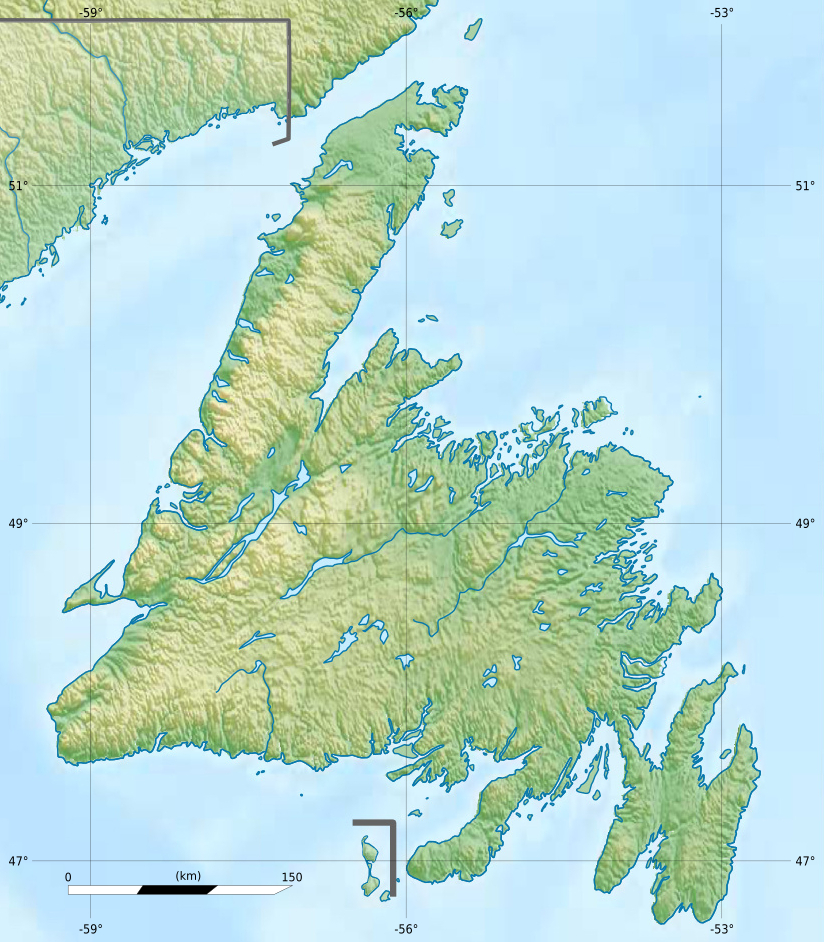
- Location within Newfoundland
- Location: Newfoundland, Canada
- Parent range: Long Range Mountains
- Topo map: NTS 12B16 Georges Lake

Climbing
- First ascent: William Seaward (1832)
- Easiest route: class 2 scramble

The Cabox is the highest mountain on the island of Newfoundland, located on the western part of the island near the coastal town of Stephenville. It is 812 m (2,664 ft) high and the central peak of the Lewis Hills of the Long Range Mountains, which are a subrange in the Appalachian Mountains.

== See also ==
- Mountain peaks of Canada
