= List of mountains of Canada =

Most mountain peaks of Canada lie in the west, specifically in British Columbia, Alberta, and the Yukon. Mountains can be found all over British Columbia while those in Alberta are mainly situated on the eastern side of the Canadian Rockies. The Saint Elias Mountains in the Yukon hold some of country's highest mountains, including the highest, Mount Logan at 5,959 metres (19,551 ft).

== Alberta ==
Media related to Mountains of Alberta at Wikimedia Commons

Highest peaks

Mountain/Peak	metres	feet	Mountain range	Notes
Mount Columbia	3,747	12,293	Winston Churchill Range	Second highest in Canadian Rockies
Twin Peaks massif	3,684	12,087	Winston Churchill Range	Can be skied to the summit
Mount Alberta	3,619	11,873	Winston Churchill Range	Ice axe used in first ascent (1925) on exhibit at Jasper Yellowhead Museum
Mount Assiniboine	3,616	11,864	Canadian Rockies	Matterhorn of the Rockies
Mount Forbes	3,612	11,850	Canadian Rockies	Highest in Banff National Park
Mount Temple	3,543	11,624	Bow Range	First 11,000' mountain to be climbed in the Canadian Rockies (1894)
Mount Brazeau	3,525	11,565	Brazeau Range	South of Maligne Lake
Mount Kitchener	3,505	11,499	Winston Churchill Range	Originally named Mount Douglas
Mount Lyell	3,504	11,496	Lyell Group	Five distinct peaks
Snow Dome	3,456	11,339	Winston Churchill Range	A hydrological apex of North America

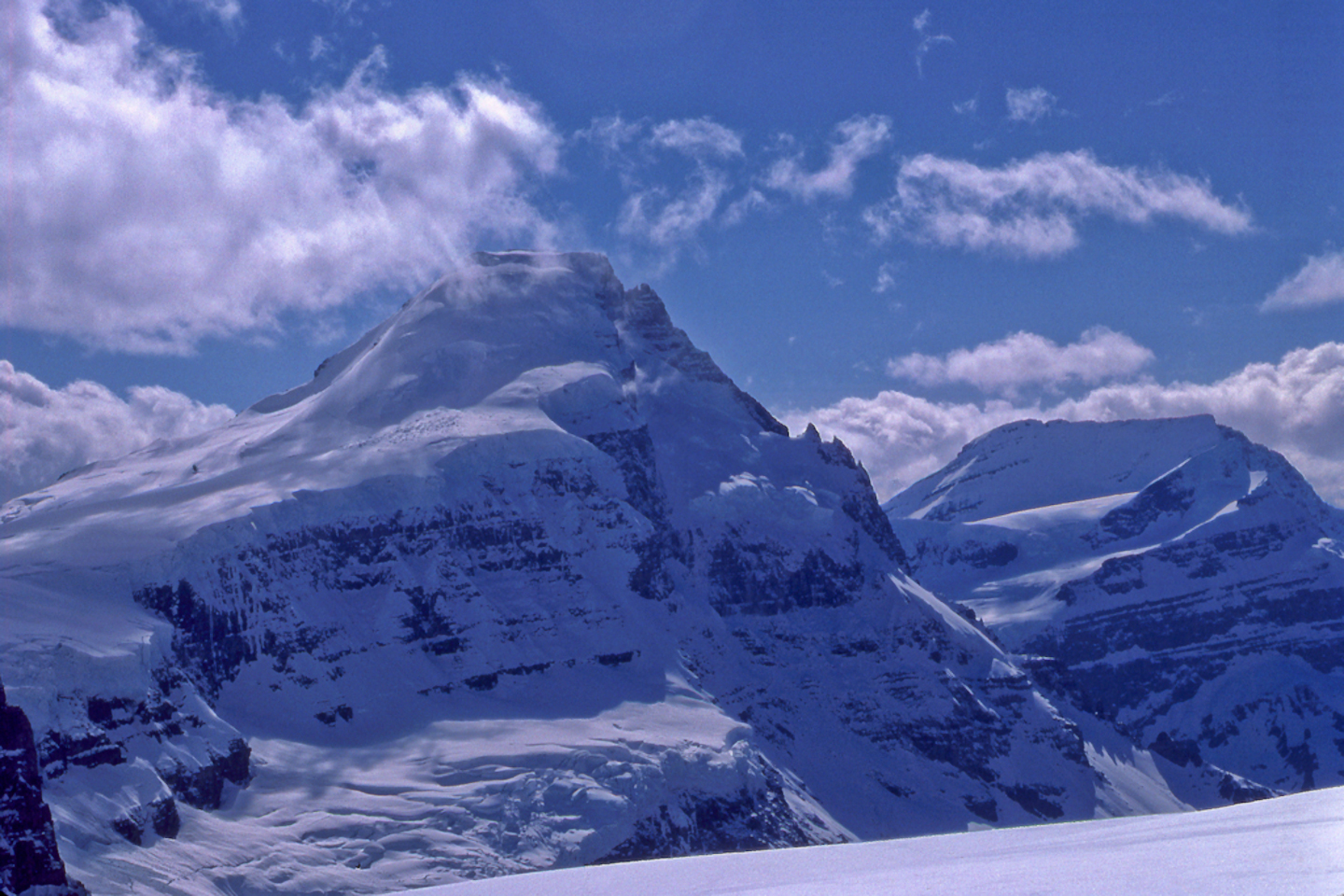
Mount Columbia & King Edward in background

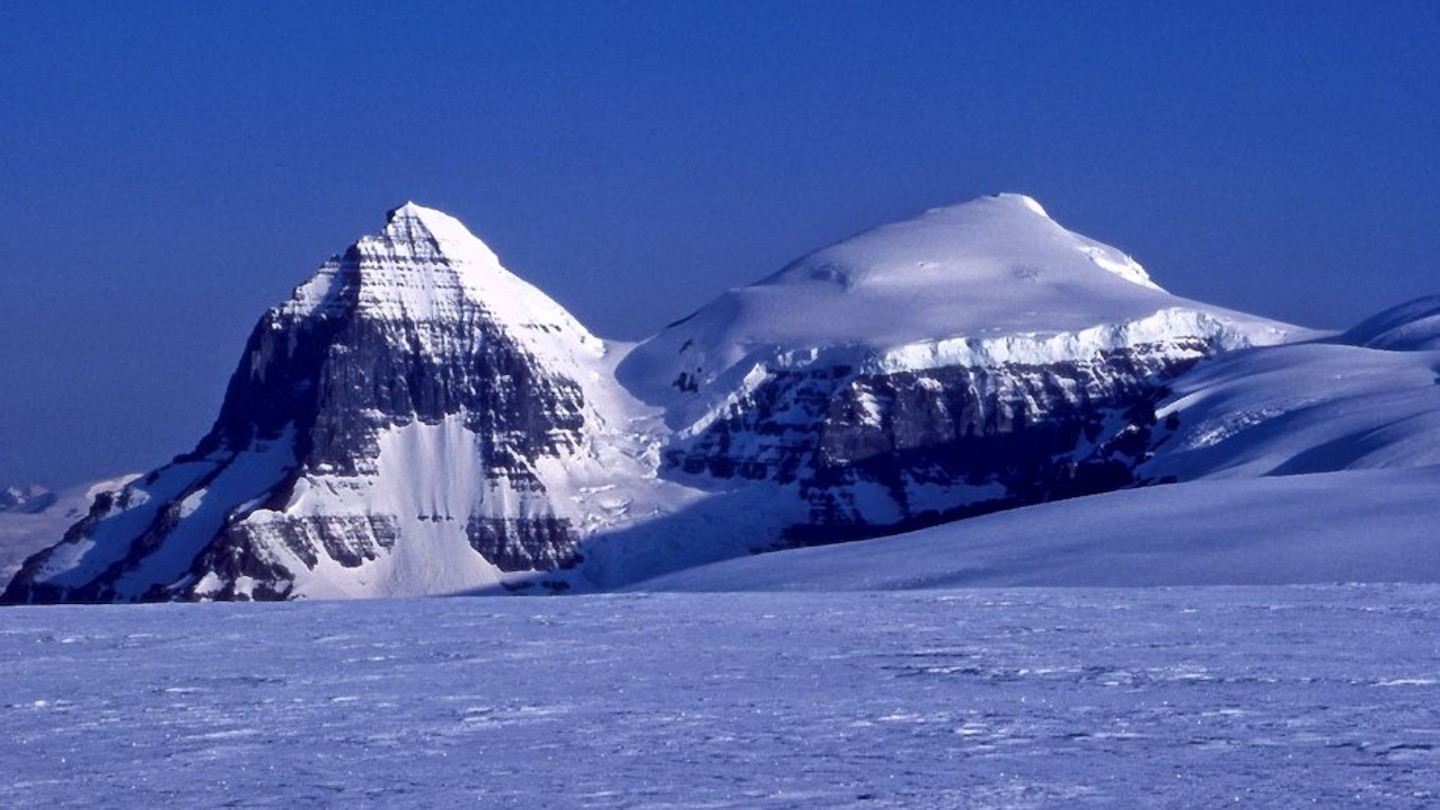
The Twins massif - South Twin and North Twin (l-r)

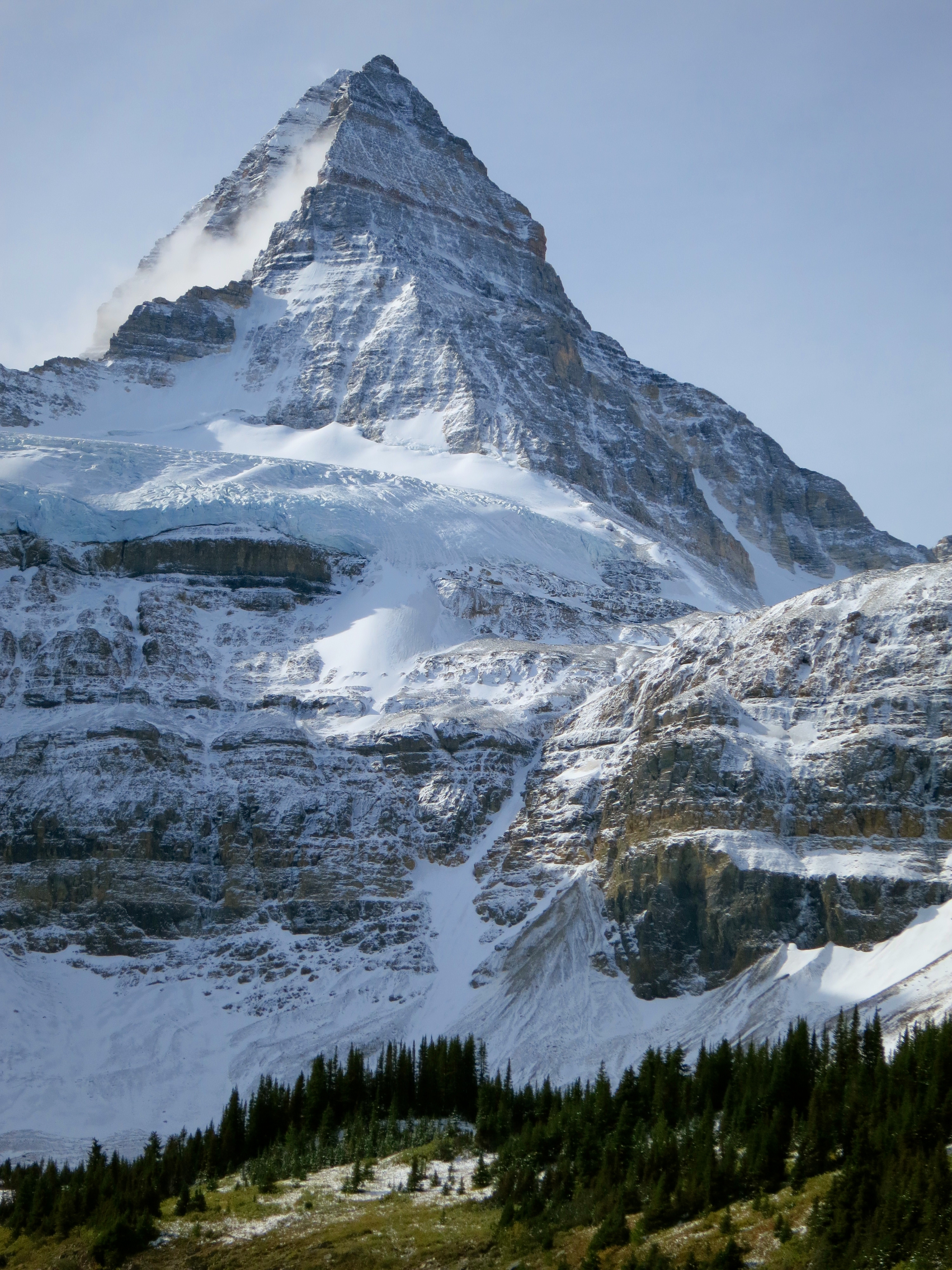
Mount Assiniboine seen from above Lake Magog

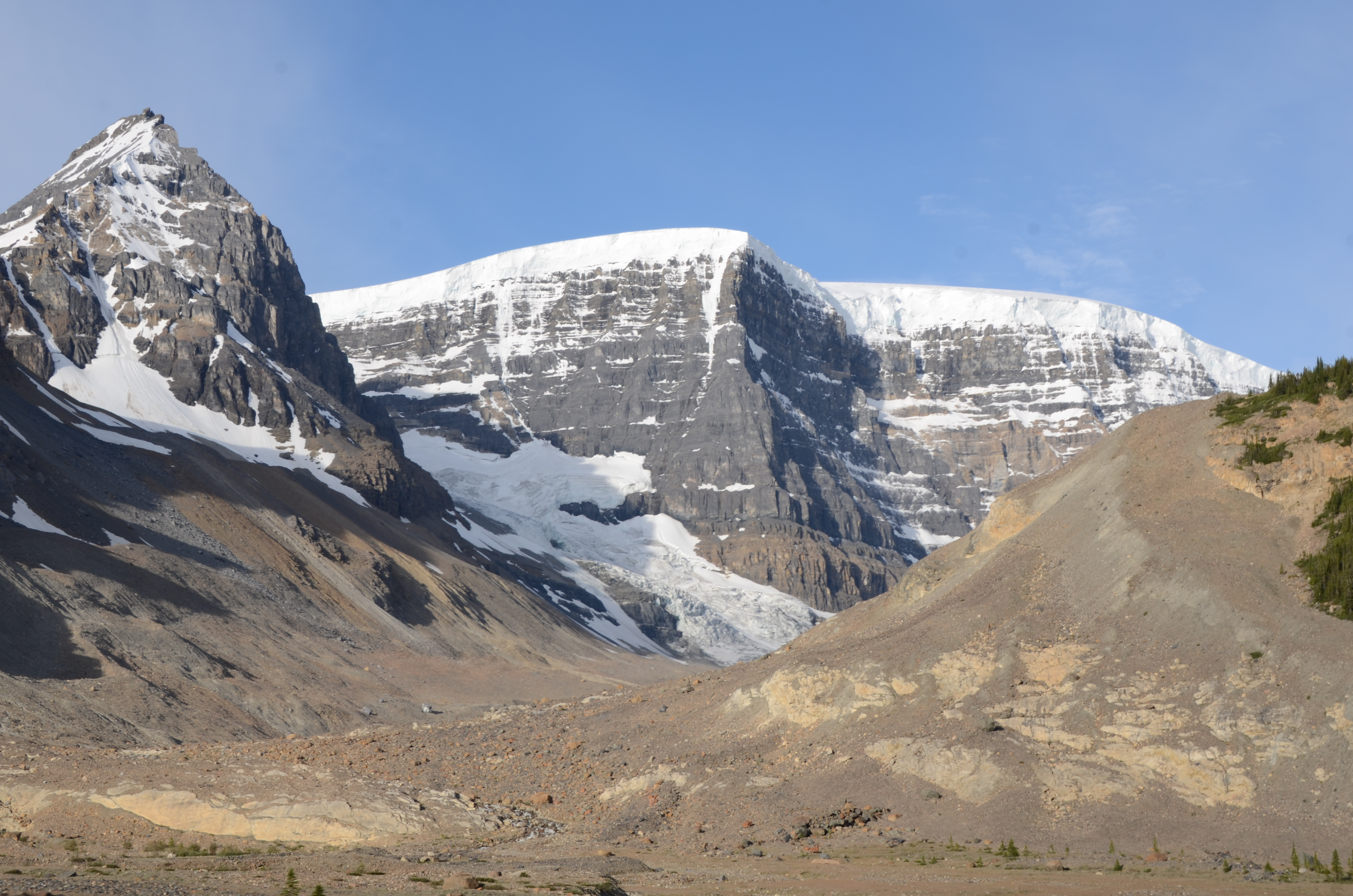
Snow Dome seen from Icefields Parkway

== British Columbia ==
Media related to Mountains of British Columbia at Wikimedia Commons

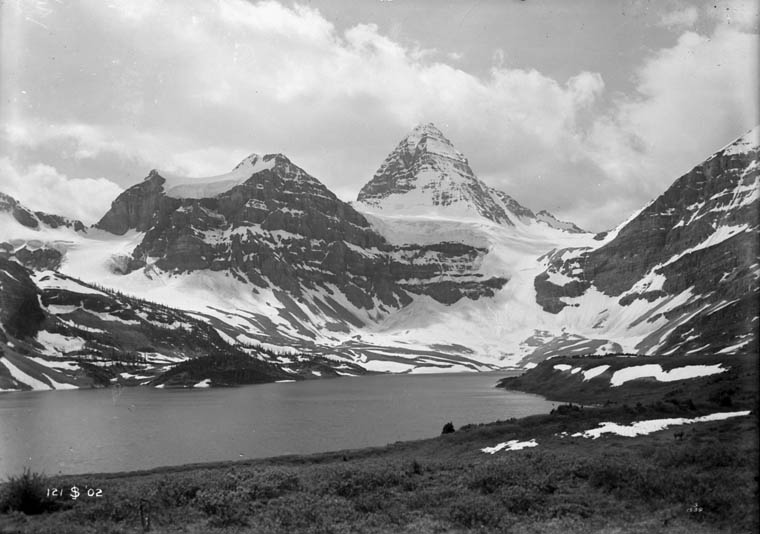
Mount Assiniboine

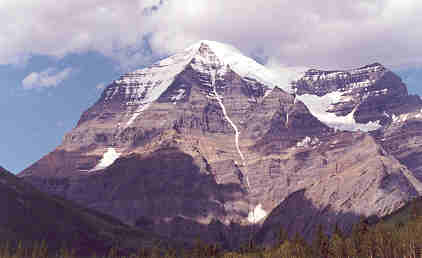
Mount Robson, highest in Canadian Rockies

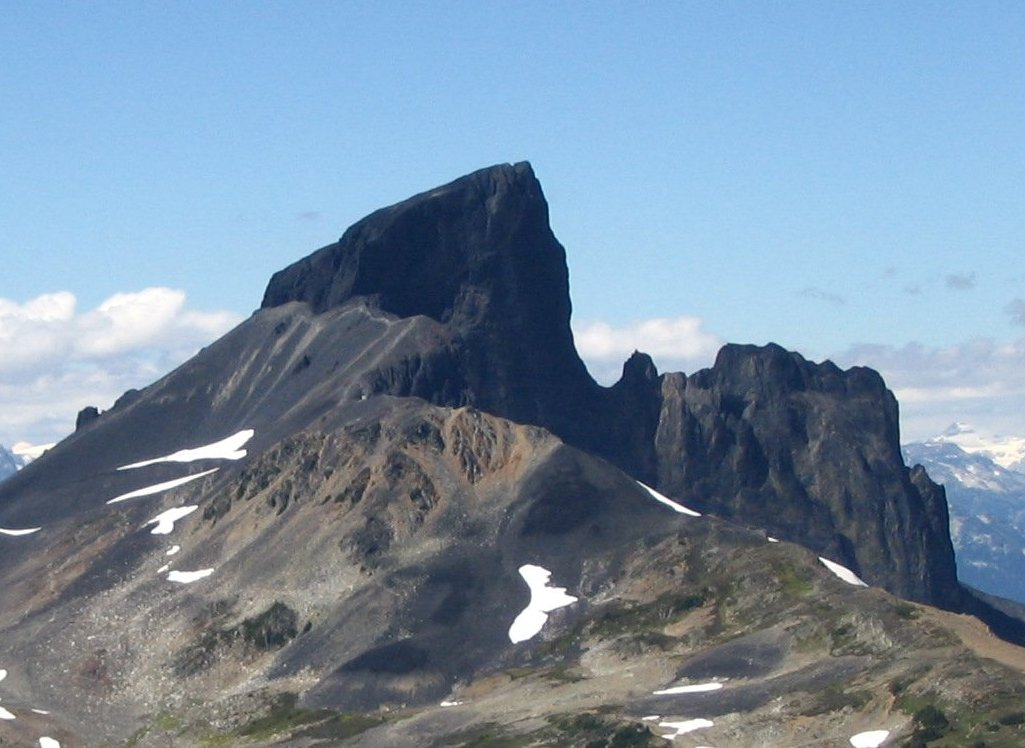
The Black Tusk

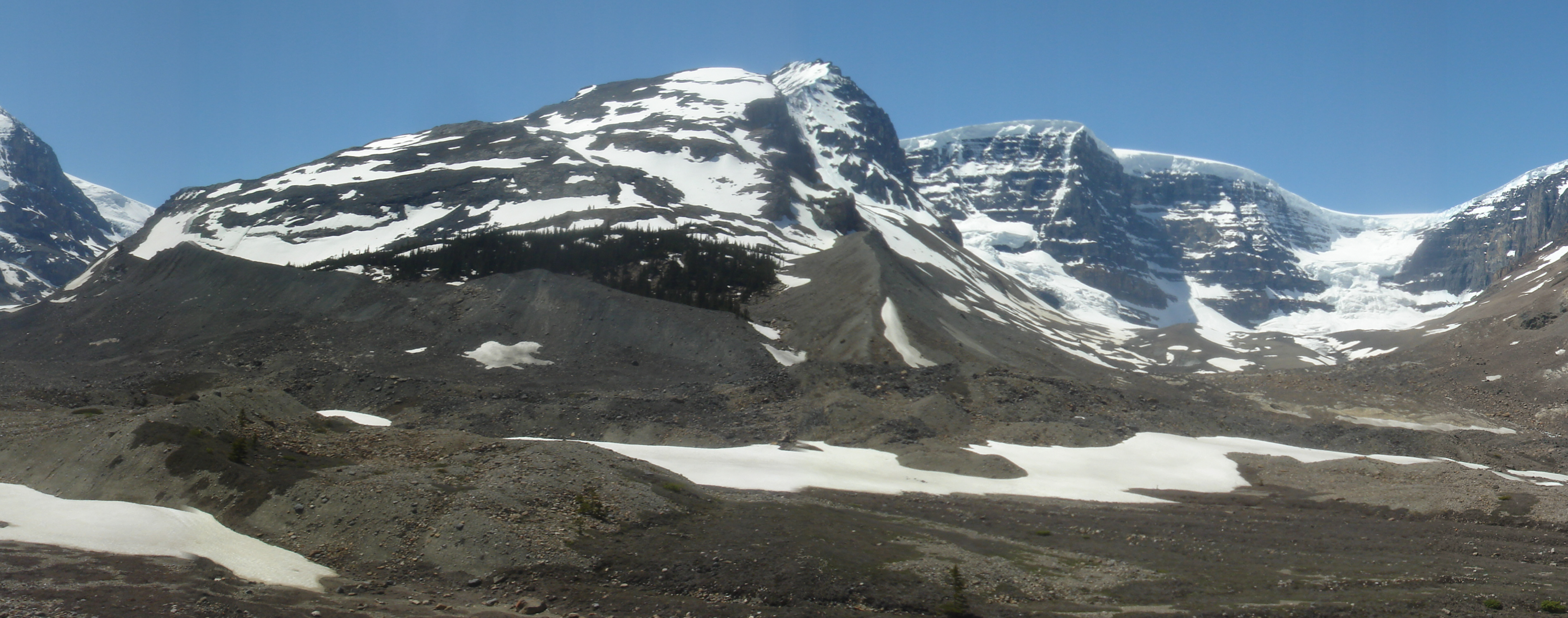
Snow Dome and Dome Glacier

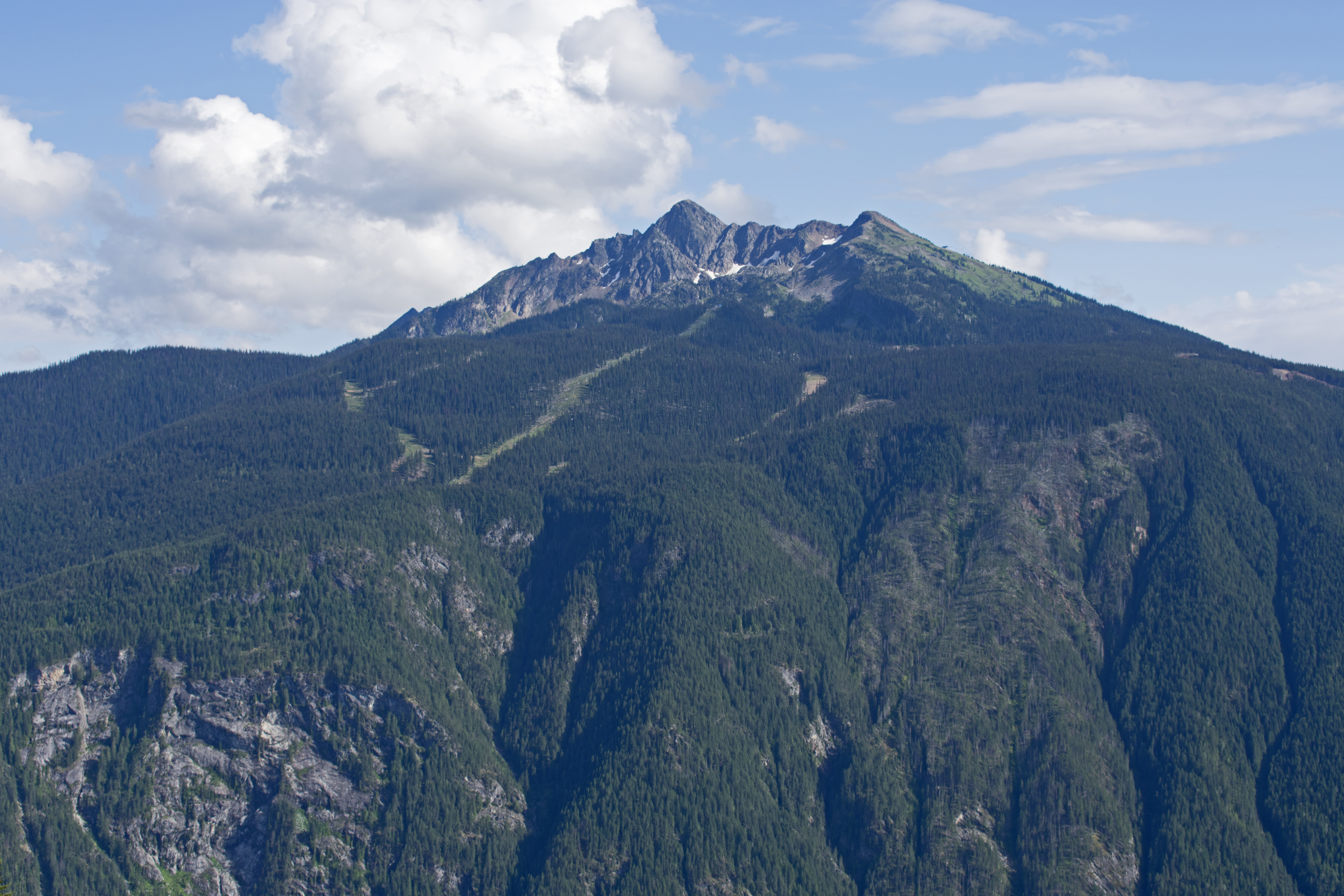
Mount Mackenzie

== Manitoba ==
- Baldy Mountain (Manitoba), highest summit in Manitoba
- Hart Mountain (Manitoba), highest summit of the Porcupine Hills

== New Brunswick ==
- Mount Carleton, highest summit in New Brunswick and the Maritimes
- Big Bald Mountain
- Christmas Mountains, a series of mountains named after different Christmas themes
- Notre Dame Mountains
- Colonels Mountain
- Sugarloaf Mountain
- Crabbe Mountain
- Poley Mountain
- Sagamook Mountain
- Mount Head

== Newfoundland and Labrador ==
=== Newfoundland ===
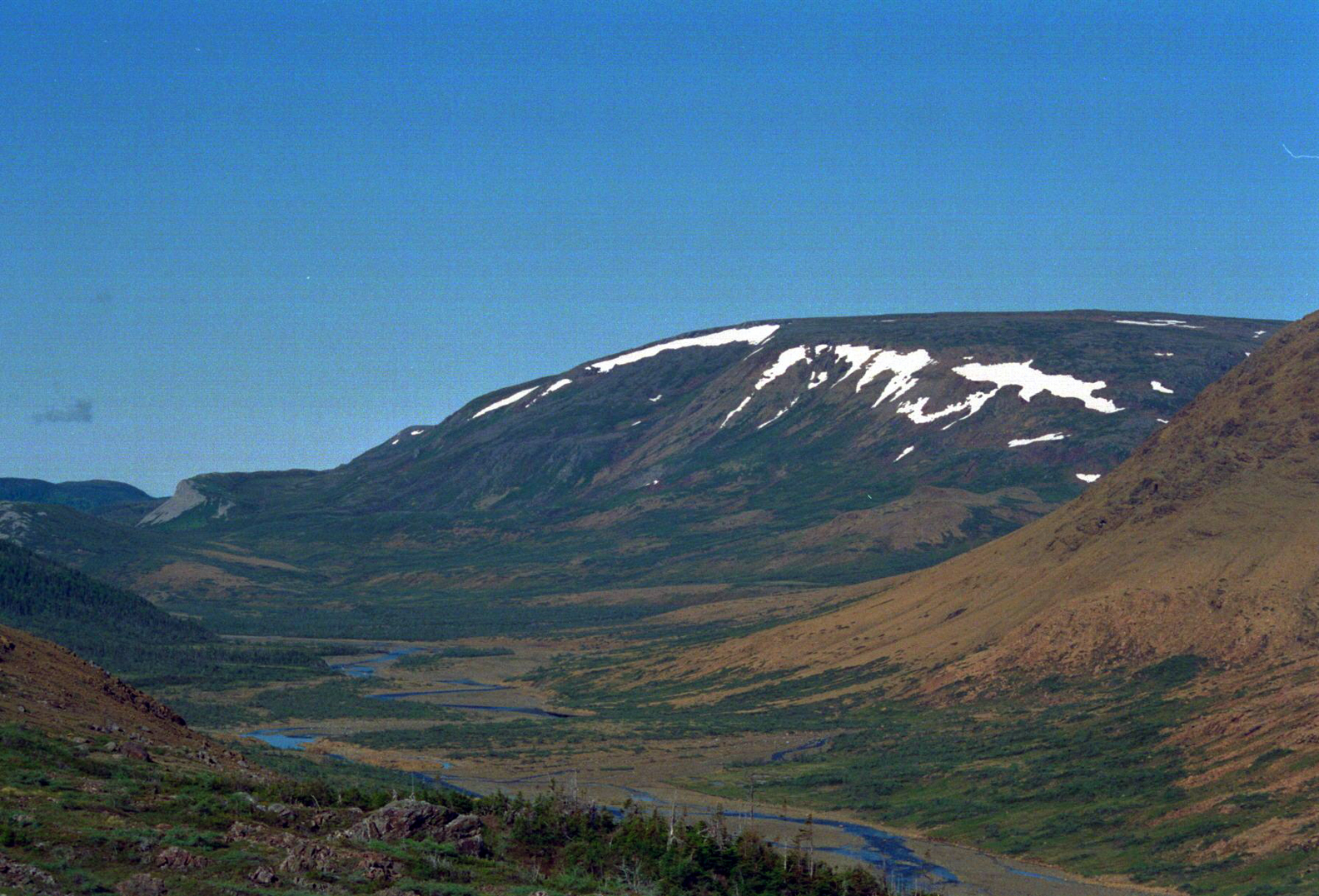
The Cabox, the highest mountain on the island of Newfoundland

- Cabox, the: highest summit of the Lewis Hills and the Island of Newfoundland
- Gros Morne
- Mount Musgrave
- Peter Snout
- Pic a Tenerife

=== Labrador ===
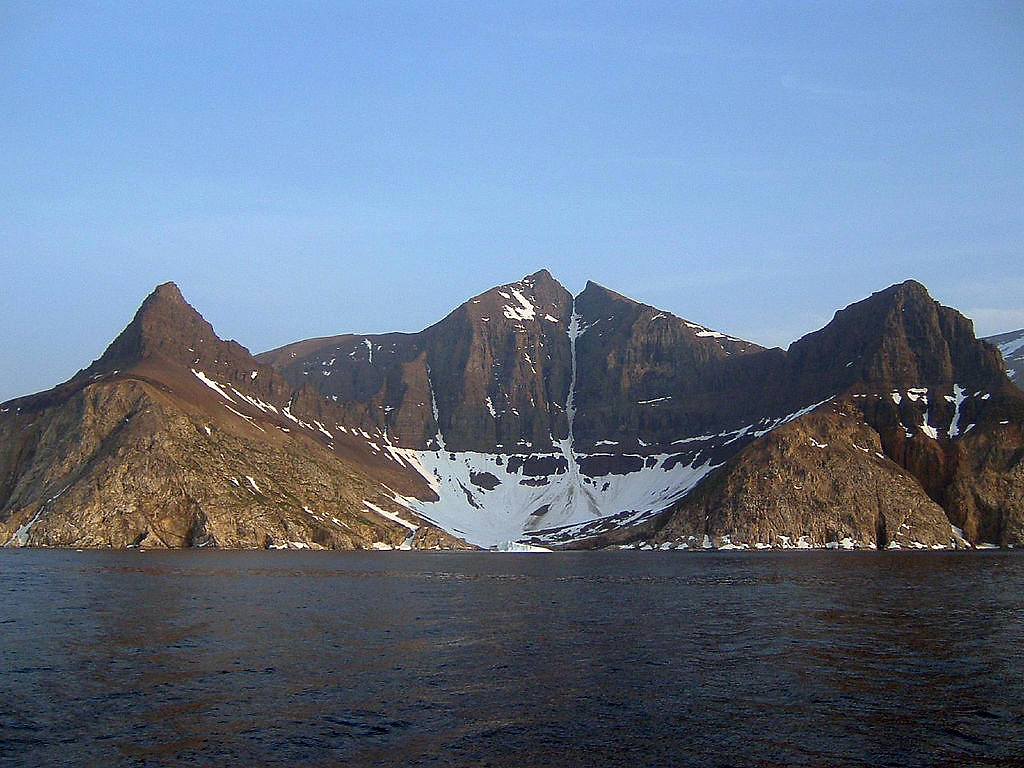
Bishop's Mitre, Labrador

- Bishop's Mitre
- Brave Mountain, highest summit of the Kaumajet Mountains
- Cirque Mountain
- Man O'War Peak
- Mealy Mountains High Point
- Mount Caubvik, highest summit of the Torngat Mountains, in the province of Newfoundland and Labrador, and of Atlantic Canada
- Peak 3400 Map 14E2

== Northwest Territories ==
- Cap Mountain, highest summit of the Franklin Mountains
- Mount Nirvana, highest summit of the Mackenzie Mountains and the Northwest Territories
- Mount Sir James MacBrien

== Nova Scotia ==
- North Mountain (Nova Scotia)
- Nuttby Mountain, highest summit of the Cobequid Hills
- South Mountain (Nova Scotia)
- White Hill (Nova Scotia), highest summit of the Cape Breton Highlands and Nova Scotia

== Nunavut ==
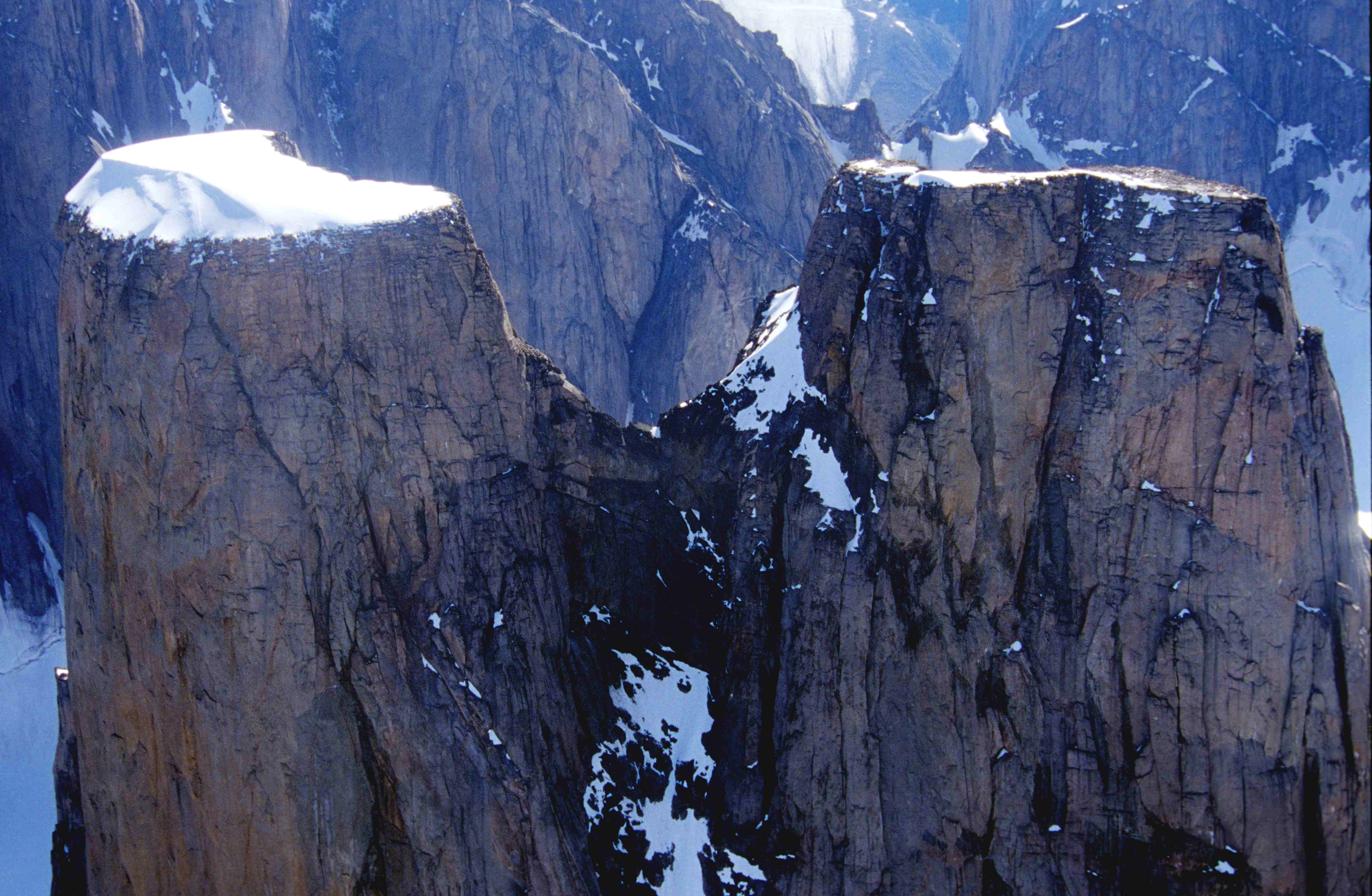
Twin peaks of Mount Asgard

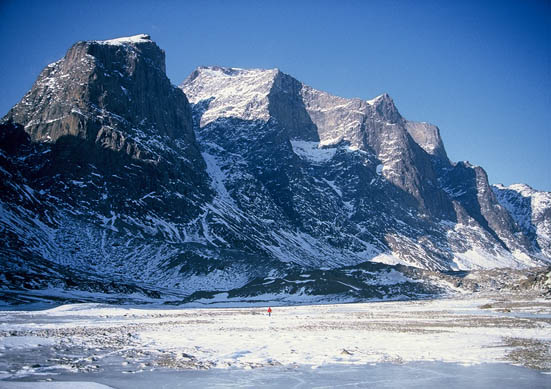
Mount Odin snow and ice

- Angilaaq Mountain, highest summit of Bylot Island
- Angna Mountain
- Arrowhead Mountain
- Barbeau Peak, highest summit of Ellesmere Island and Nunavut
- Breidablik Peak
- Commonwealth Mountain
- Devon Ice Cap High Point, highest summit of Devon Island
- Durham Heights
- Highpointer Peak
- Kisimngiuqtuq Peak
- Malik Mountain
- Melville Hills High Point, highest summit of the Melville Hills and continental Nunavut
- Melville Island High Point, highest summit of Melville Island
- Midgard Mountain
- Midnight Sun Peak
- Mount Arthur (Nunavut)
- Mount Asgard
- Mount Ayles
- Mount Baldr
- Mount Battle
- Mount Beaufort
- Mount Biederbick
- Mount Eugene
- Mount Odin, highest summit of Baffin Island
- Mount Oxford (Nunavut)
- Mount Thor
- Mount Whisler
- Outlook Peak, highest summit of Axel Heiberg Island
- Peak 08-46
- Peak 09-30
- Peak 35-44
- Peak 39-18
- Penny Highland
- Porsild Mountains
- Qiajivik Mountain (key-a-jiv-ick)
- Sillem Island High Point
- South Ellesmere Ice Cap High Point
- Stokes Mountain
- Torngarsoak Mountain
- Tupeq Mountain
- Ukpik Peak
- Victoria Island High Point, highest summit of Victoria Island
- White Crown Mountain

== Ontario ==
- Caribou Mountain
- High Rock
- Ishpatina Ridge, highest point of land in Ontario
- Maple Mountain
- Mount McKay
- Rib Mountain
- Silver Peak (Ontario)
- Tip Top Mountain

== Prince Edward Island ==
- Prince Edward Island High Point, highest summit of the province of Prince Edward Island

== Quebec ==
- Mont Brome, highest summit of the Collines Montérégiennes
- Mont D'Iberville (Mount Caubvick), highest summit of the Monts Torngat and the Province of Quebec
- Mont du Lac à Moïse, part of the Grands-Jardins National Park, Charlevoix Regional County Municipality
- Mont du Lac des Cygnes, part of the Grands-Jardins National Park, Charlevoix Regional County Municipality
- Mont Jacques-Cartier, highest summit of the Monts Chic-Chocs, and the Canadian Appalachians
- Mont Raoul Blanchard, highest summit of the Laurentian Mountains
- Mont Saint-Grégoire
- Mont Saint-Hilaire
- Mont Saint-Pierre
- Mont Tremblant
- Mont Wright, Quebec
- Mont Yapeitso
- Mount Babel (Quebec)
- Mount Royal
- Mount Albert (Quebec)
- Mount Valin
- Mont Mégantic
- Mont Orford
- Mont Gosford, highest summit in south of the Province of Quebec
- Mont Owl's Head
- Mont Sutton
- Mont Saint-Pierre, Quebec
- Mont des Pics, Quebec
- Mont Xalibu
- Mont Joseph-Fortin, Quebec
- Mont Richardson, Quebec
- Mont Olivine, Quebec
- Mont Logan, Quebec
- Mont Lyall, Quebec
- Montagne aux Érables, in Montmagny Regional County Municipality
- Montagne des Érables, in Charlevoix
- Mount Édouard, in Le Fjord-du-Saguenay (MRC)

== Saskatchewan ==
- Allan Hills
- Beaver Hills
- Mount Blackstrap
- Cub Hills
- Cypress Hills, highest summit in Saskatchewan
- The Dirt Hills
- Frenchman Butte
- Meadow Lake Escarpment
- Minichinas Hills
- Moose Mountain Upland
- Nut Mountain
- Old Man on His Back Plateau
- Pasquia Hills
- Porcupine Hills
- Thunder Hills
- Touchwood Hills
- Waskesiu Upland
- Wood Mountain Hills

== Yukon ==
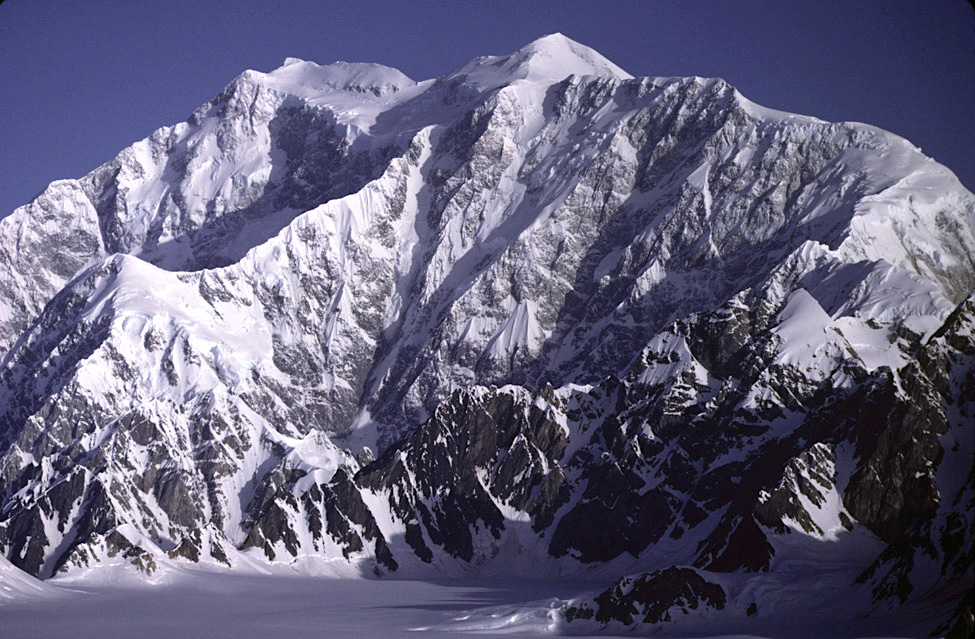
Mount Logan, Highest in Canada

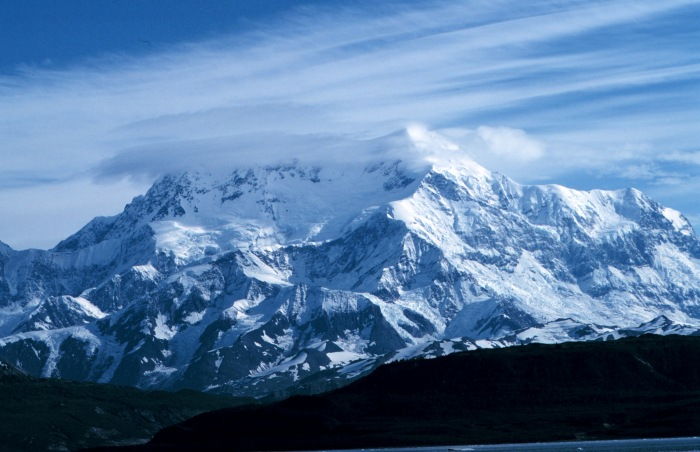
Mount Saint Elias, 2nd highest in Canada

== See also ==
- Outline of Canada
- Bibliography of Canada
- Canada
  - Geography of Canada
    - Category:Mountains of Canada
- Physical geography
  - Topography
    - Topographic elevation
    - Topographic isolation
    - Topographic prominence
    - Topographic summit
- Lists of mountains by region
  - List of mountain peaks of North America
    - List of mountain peaks of Greenland
    - Mountain peaks of Canada
      - List of mountains of Canada
      - List of volcanoes in Canada
      - The 100 Highest major mountain peaks of Canada
      - The 142 Ultra-prominent mountain peaks of Canada
      - The 100 Most topographically isolated major mountain peaks of Canada
    - List of mountain peaks of the Rocky Mountains
    - List of mountain peaks of the United States
    - List of mountain peaks of Mexico
    - List of mountain peaks of Central America
    - List of mountain peaks of the Caribbean
