= Mount Olivine (Quebec) =

Mount in Gaspésie, in Quebec, Canada

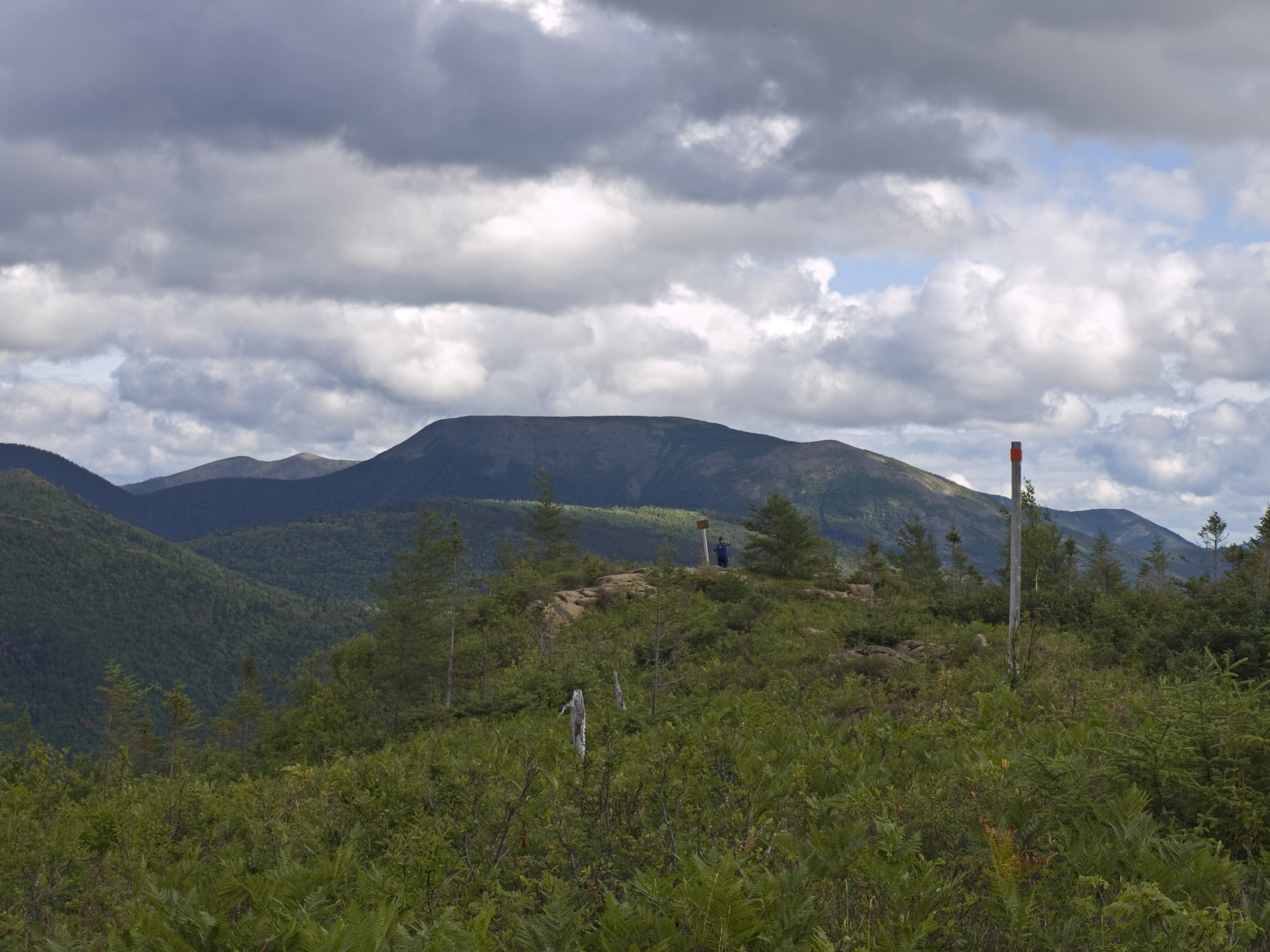

Highest point
- Elevation: 670 m (2,200 ft)
- Coordinates: 48.91272°N 66.11364°W

Geography
- Country: Canada
- Province: Quebec
- Administrative region: Gaspésie–Îles-de-la-Madeleine
- MRC: La Haute-Gaspésie Regional County Municipality
- Parent range: Chic-Choc Mountains

The Mont Olivine is a mountain in Gaspésie National Park, in the unincorporated territory of Mont-Albert, in the La Haute-Gaspésie Regional County Municipality (MRC), in the region of Gaspésie–Îles-de-la-Madeleine, in Quebec, in Canada.

Mount Olivine is one of the Chic-Choc Mountains.

== Main activities ==
The intermediate level hiking trail to the top of Mount Olivine is 10.93 kilometres (6.79 mi) with an elevation of 481 metres (1,578 ft) (approximately 5:30 hours hiking or 9:45 hours snowshoeing in winter). The summit is at 663 metres (2,175 ft).

Mount Olivine is one of the few mountains in the area accessible by snowshoeing in winter.

The trailhead starts at the Discovery and Visitors Center of Gaspésie National Park. Hikers then take the La Grande Traversée trail (westbound), and pay attention to the signs indicating the direction of Mont Olivine. By first following the Sainte-Anne River, the trail turns out to be relatively flat. From the third kilometer, very close to the Devil's Fall, the ascent becomes more demanding.

After the first big stage of the climb, the hikers arrive at an intersection where the left path leads to the top of Mount Olivine. Along the way, hikers can admire the Mount Albert plateau. The return of the hike is done by doing the reverse route.

== Toponymy ==
The toponym "Mont Olivine" refers to the fact that a prospector found olivine near Mont Albert. Olivine is a green mineral very rich in magnesium, from the group of silicates.

The toponym "Mont Olivine" was formalized on February 7, 1989 at the place name bank of the Commission de toponymie du Québec.

== See also ==
- List of mountains of Quebec
