= Mount Lyall (Quebec) =

Mount in Gaspésie, in Quebec, Canada

- Mont Lyall
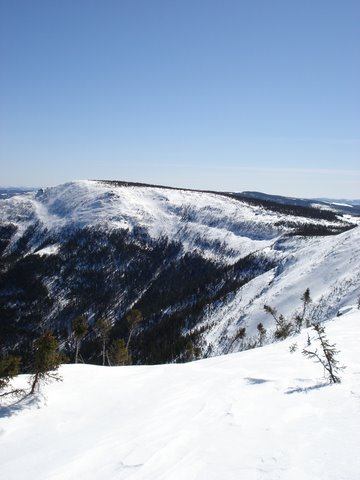
- Cirque du Mont Lyall

Highest point
- Elevation: 936 m (3,071 ft)
- Listing: Mountains of Quebec
- Coordinates: 48°47′26″N 66°05′28″W

Geography
- Location within Quebec
- Country: Canada
- Province: Quebec
- Administrative region: Gaspésie–Îles-de-la-Madeleine
- MRC: La Haute-Gaspésie Regional County Municipality
- Protected area: Gaspésie National Park
- Parent range: Chic-Choc Mountains
- Topo map: NTS 22B16 Mont Albert

Mont Lyall is a mountain in Gaspésie National Park, in the unorganized territory of Mont-Albert, in the La Haute-Gaspésie Regional County Municipality, in the region of Gaspésie–Îles-de-la-Madeleine, in Quebec, Canada. It is part of the Chic-Choc Mountains. Mont Lyall is located on an outcrop of land on the west shore of Lac Saint-Anne.

== Mount Lyall agate mine ==
The Mont Lyall Agate Mine is located in Lemieux Township on the site of an ancient volcano that existed 350 million years ago. Valérien Côté was the discoverer-founder of this fine stone mine. He started his geological research in 1974. Between 1979 and 1981, there was deforestation of an area of 700 hectares (2 3/4 mi^{2}) to facilitate prospecting; many excavations were carried out by a D-8 bulldozer. The first significant indication of fine stones was discovered in 1981.

This mining park welcomes visitors alone, as a couple, as a family or in a group for a prospector experience of about 2 to 3 hours. The site has two open-air quarries full of geodes of various sizes. The activity consists of prospecting and collecting geodes. The cut stones expose cavities of crystals and minerals including agate, jasper, carnelian and quartz of different colors (amethyst, citrine, rose quartz, smoky, black), etc. The stone cutting service is offered on site. The public can visit this open pit mine since 1993. Mr. Jean-Paul Cameron, a retiree from Cap-Chat, was the first host camp leader.

== Trail to the top ==
From the Mont Lyall parking lot, a marked path leads to the summit. This pedestrian ascent begins quite slowly in the forest area until the ridge line. Then, the slope becomes more accentuated at the halfway point and includes a large turn. At the top, there are several secondary tracks allowing to admire the panorama; all lead to a marked trail back.

== Mountain skiing ==
In 1990, the installations began at Mont Lyall for the practice of mountain skiing thanks to the COOP Accès Chic-Chocs. Development work continued over the years thanks to the financial participation of several partners, in particular the MRC de La Haute-Gaspésie Regional County Municipality, the CLD de la Haute-Gaspésie, the government of Quebec, the FQME, Sépaq and Mountain Equipment Co-op (MEC). The development of the developed ski area aims to improve the quality of the skiers' experience, in particular the development of new undergrowth, by building daily shelters, and to improve emergency plans and measures.

Skiers can climb the mountain by various climbs: the ascent of the Fortress, the ascent of the Trail (which is an area conducive to avalanches), the Lavoie route and l'Autre Montée.

== Toponymy ==
The toponym "Mont Lyall" evokes the memory of T.O. Lyall, of the company "Lyall Construction" of Montreal. Mineral rights in the region had been granted to it around 1928. The toponym was formalized on December 5, 1968, at the Place Names Bank of the Commission de toponymie du Québec.
