= Mount Arthur =

Mount Arthur may refer to:

- Mount Arthur (Antarctica) in Antarctica
- Mount Arthur (New Zealand) in New Zealand
- Mount Arthur (Nunavut) in Nunavut, Canada
- Mount Arthur (Tasmania) in Tasmania, Australia
- Mount Arthur (British Columbia) in British Columbia, Canada
- Mount Arthur (Washington) in the Olympic Mountains, USA
- Mount Arthur coal mine in Muswellbrook, Australia
