= Breiðablik =

Breiðablik (sometimes anglicised to Breithablik or Breidablik) is the home of the god Baldur in Nordic mythology.

The name can also refer to:

== Locations ==
- Breidablik Peak, a mountain in Canada
- Breidablick, Washington, a community in the USA

== Sports ==
- Breiðablik (sports club), a sports club in Kópavogur, Iceland
  - Breiðablik men's basketball, department of the Breiðablik sports club
  - Breiðablik women's basketball, department of the Breiðablik sports club
  - Breiðablik (men's football), department of the Breiðablik sports club
  - Breiðablik (women's football), department of the Breiðablik sports club
