= Bishop's Mitre =

Bishop's Mitre could refer to:

- several types of headdress, notably :
  - a traditional, ceremonial head-dress of bishops and some other clergy in Christian Churches. See mitre.
  - a variety of types of headdress worn by European Grenadiers from the 17th Century.
- Bishop's Mitre, a mountain in Labrador, Canada
- the Bishop's Mitre, the shieldbug Aelia acuminata
