= Crown Mountain =

Crown Mountain may refer to:

- A mountain near Urbenville, New South Wales, Australia
- Crown Mountain (Antarctica)
- Crown Mountain (North Shore Mountains), British Columbia, Canada
- Crown Mountain (Vancouver Island, British Columbia), Canada
- A mountain in Dahlonega, Georgia, United States
- Crown Mountain (Lewis and Clark County, Montana), a mountain in Lewis and Clark County, Montana
- Crown Mountain (Texas), United States
- Crown Mountain (United States Virgin Islands)

== See also ==
- The Crown (mountain), in the Karakoram mountain range in China
- Copple Crown Mountain, Brookfield, New Hampshire
- Iron Crown Mountain, near Haenertsburg, South Africa
- White Crown Mountain, Axel Heiberg Island, Nunavut, Canada
