= Mount Joseph-Fortin =

Mount in Gaspésie, in Quebec, Canada

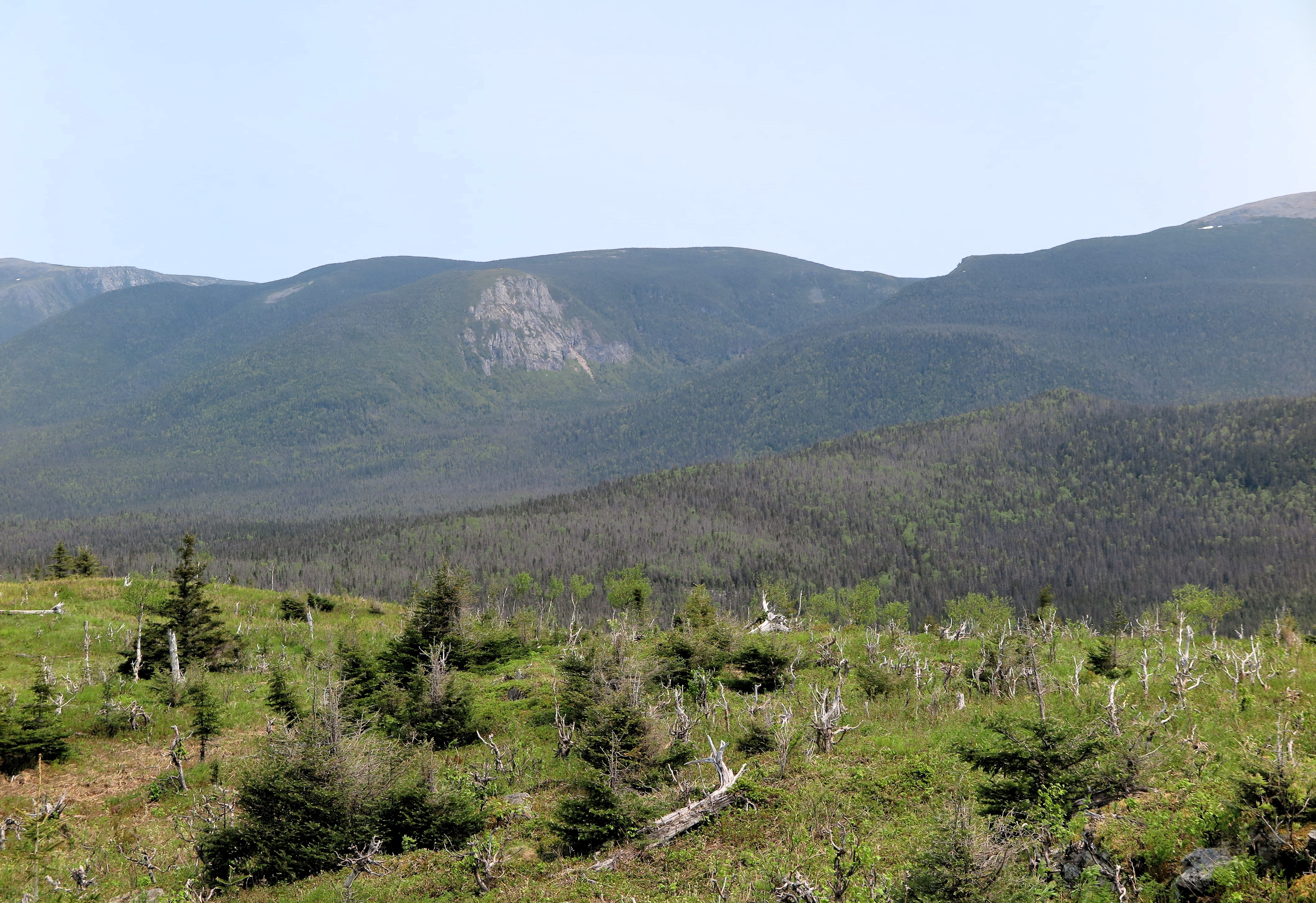

Highest point
- Elevation: 1,080 m (3,540 ft)
- Coordinates: 48.94667°N 66.01944°W

Geography
- Country: Canada
- Province: Quebec
- Administrative region: Gaspésie–Îles-de-la-Madeleine
- MRC: La Haute-Gaspésie Regional County Municipality
- Parent range: Chic-Choc Mountains

Mont Joseph-Fortin is a mountain in Gaspésie National Park, in the unorganized territory of Mont-Albert, in La Haute-Gaspésie Regional County Municipality, in the region of Gaspésie–Îles-de-la-Madeleine, in Quebec, in Canada.

== Main activities ==
The hiking trail leading to the top of Mont Joseph-Fortin is 9.8 kilometres (6.1 mi) (about 4 hours) and 11.18 kilometres (6.95 mi) (round trip) to reach the summit of mount Richardson. At the start of the ascent, the path is common to both mountains; it is generally rocky. The ascent is steep in places.

== Toponymy ==
The toponym "Mont Joseph-Fortin" had been proposed to the Commission de toponymie du Québec by the administration. A native of Sainte-Anne-des-Monts, Joseph Fortin worked as a coureur de bois and mountain guide for the entire territory of the park. Fortin was a member of Fernald's expeditions in 1905 and 1906 and 1923. He was recognized for his ability to herbalise and assimilate the Latin names of plants. This toponym emphasizes the efforts of an authentic mountain guide. He died on May 30, 1960.

The toponym "Mont Joseph-Fortin" was made official on February 7, 1989, at the place name bank of the Commission de toponymie du Québec.

== Related article ==
- Gaspésie National Park
- List of mountains of Quebec
