= Cycas curranii =

Conservation status
- Critically Endangered (IUCN 3.1)

Scientific classification
- Kingdom: Plantae
- Clade: Tracheophytes
- Clade: Gymnospermae
- Division: Cycadophyta
- Class: Cycadopsida
- Order: Cycadales
- Family: Cycadaceae
- Genus: Cycas
- Species: C. curranii

Binomial name
- Cycas curranii (J.Schust.) K.D.Hill

Species of cycad

Cycas curranii (Curran's pitogo) is a species of cycad endemic to the Philippines.

== Range ==
There are two subpopulations of Cycas curranii.

- Mount Beaufort in the Malinao River watershed, Palawan
- Bongabon and Mansalay, Mindoro Oriental province

In Palawan, it is also found in Puerto Princesa, and Aborlan, and Narra.
