= Minichinas Hills =

Hills in Saskatchewan, Canada

Coordinates: 52°35′N 105°56′W

The Minichinas Hills are a group of hills located in east-central parkland region of Saskatchewan, Canada. The hills are covered with forests of poplar and willows; moreover, there are also some prairie and small lakes. There are many animals that live in and around these hills such as moose, elk, hawks, bald eagles, geese, ducks and lynx; cougars and black bears have also been spotted. The hills are an important breeding ground for birds that migrate to the southern United States. There are several partnerships between Ducks Unlimited Inc, The Tennessee Wildlife Resources Agency, US Fish and Wildlife Service, and Ducks Unlimited Canada to help preserve this area. These hills start from the south, near Kenaston and continue north-east toward Dana, then stop to the north at St. Isidore-de-Bellevue which is a distance of about 100 kilometres.

== See also ==
- List of mountains of Saskatchewan
