= Cod Island =

Island in Newfoundland and Labrador, Canada

- Cod Island (Newfoundland and Labrador)

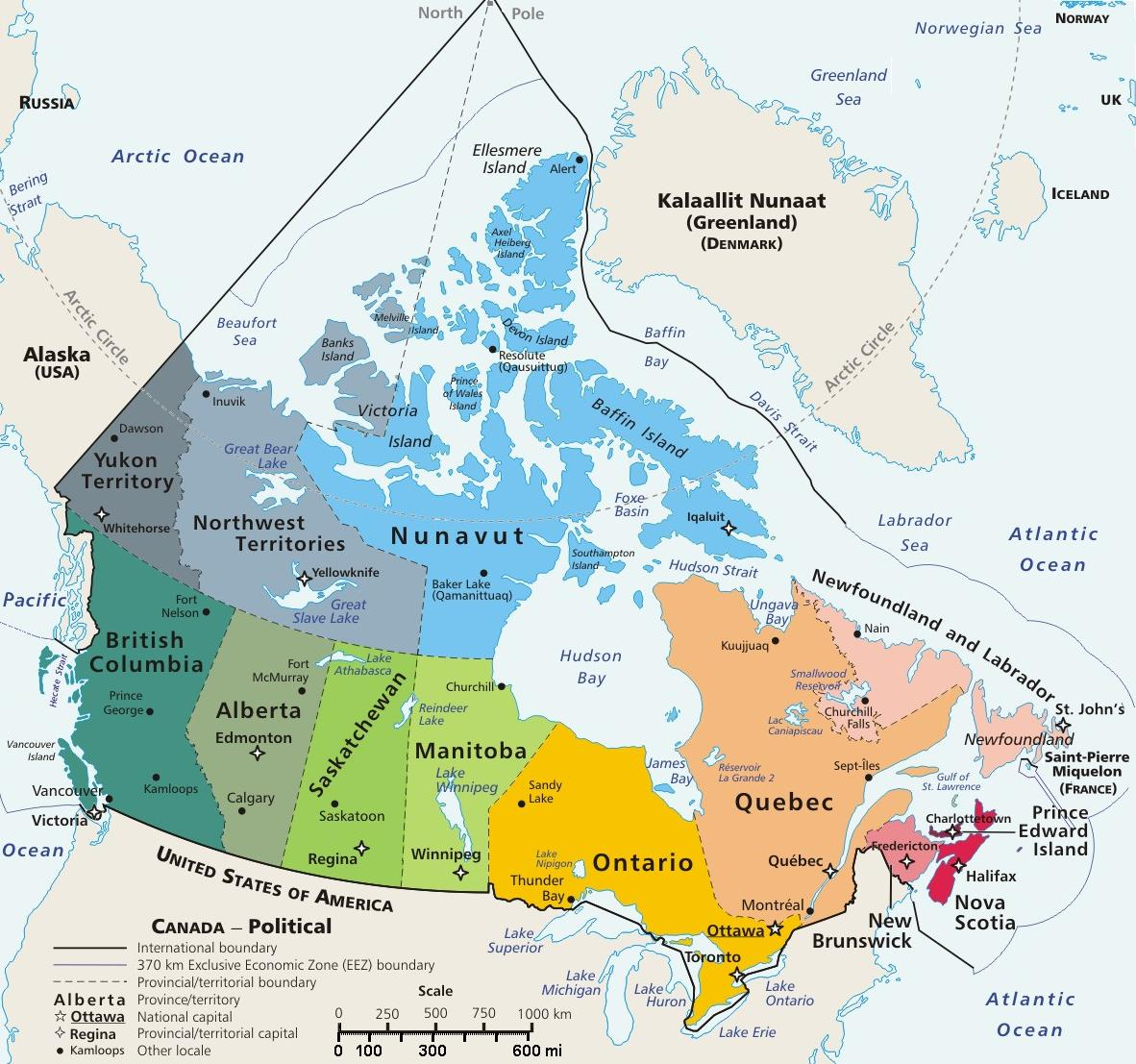
- Location within CanadaGeo

Geography
- Location: Labrador Sea, Eastern Canada
- Coordinates: 57°47′00″N 61°46′50″W
- Area: 133 km^{2} (51 sq mi)
- Highest elevation: 914 m (2999 ft)
- Highest point: Cod Island High Point

Administration
- Canada
- Province: Newfoundland and Labrador

Demographics
- Population: Uninhabited

Additional information
- Time zone: AST (UTC−04:00)
  - Summer (DST): ADT (UTC−03:00)

Cod Island is an uninhabited island in the northern coast of Newfoundland and Labrador, Canada. It is located in the province of Newfoundland and Labrador, in the eastern part of the country, 1,700 kilometers northeast of the capital Ottawa. The total area of the island is 133 square kilometres.

Early hydrographers referred to the island as Ogua-Lik. On March 7, 1957, the island received its current name.

== Background ==
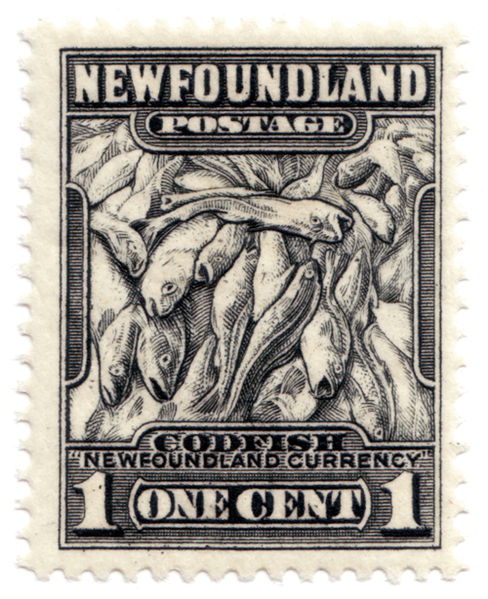
Cod postage stamp, Newfoundland

Cod island takes it name from the Atlantic cod which may be found in the area.

During the 17th and 18th centuries in the New World, especially in Massachusetts and Newfoundland, cod became a major commodity, creating trade networks and cross-cultural exchanges.

== Geography ==
Cod Island has hilly terrain with three of its peaks partially composing the Kaumajet Mountains. The island's highest point is 914 meters above sea level. It extends 15.7 kilometres in the north-south direction, and 15.4 kilometres in the east-west direction.

The area around Cod Island consists mainly of grasslands. The area around Cod Island is almost uninhabited, with less than two inhabitants per square kilometre. The annual average temperature in the area is -5 °C.

=== Table Hill ===
Table Hill is a hill on the southside of Cod Island. The top of Table Hill is 819 meters above sea level, or 551 meters above the surrounding terrain. The width at the base is 6.1 km.

The island has two dome shaped hills besides Table Hill.
