= Kaumajet Mountains =

Mountain range in Labrador, Canada

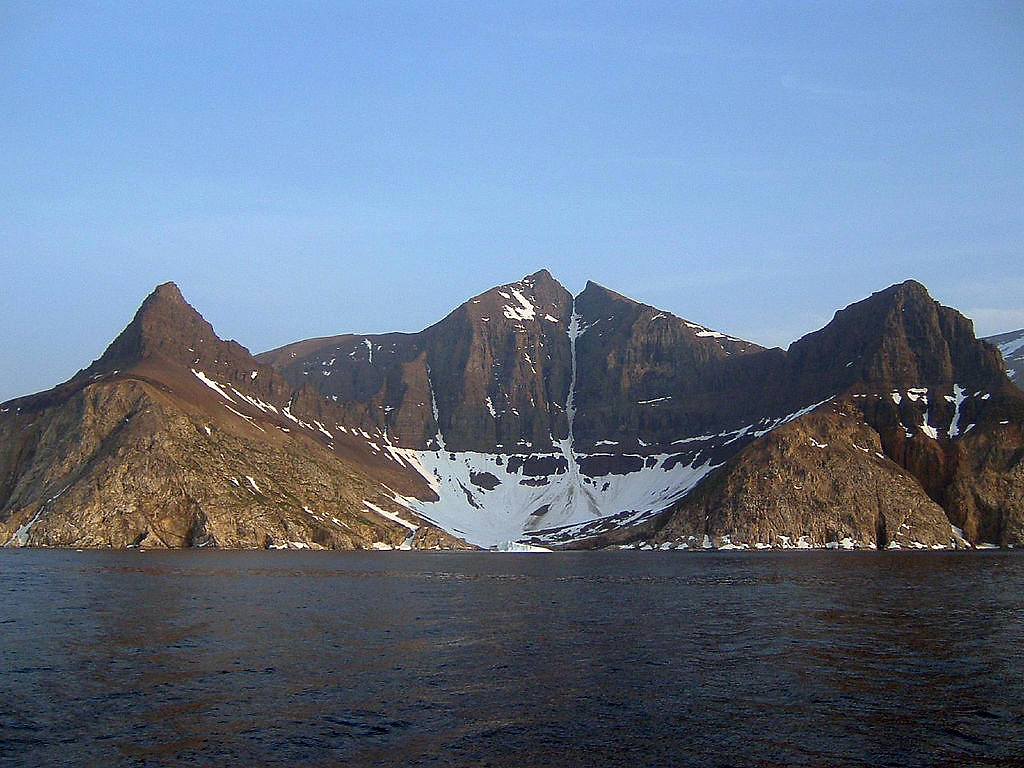
- Bishop's Mitre

Highest point
- Peak: Brave Mountain
- Elevation: 1,300 m (4,300 ft)
- Coordinates: 57°52′53″N 62°01′35″W

Geography
- Location within Newfoundland and Labrador
- Country: Canada
- Region: Labrador
- Range coordinates: 57°48′N 61°51′W
- Parent range: Arctic Cordillera

The Kaumajet Mountains are a dramatic compact mountain range rising directly out of the sea on the northern Labrador coast. The mountain range has one 4,000-foot (1,200 m) peak, the highest island peak on the east coast of North America between the Caribbean and Hudson Strait, and several peaks with very high prominence. The highest mountain in the Kaumajet Mountains is Brave Mountain at 1,300 m (4,265 ft).

Highest Peaks of the Kaumajet Mountains
Rank	Name	m	ft
1	Brave Mountain	1300	4265
2	Bishop's Mitre	1113	3652
3	The Finger	1006+	3300+
4	Peak 3300 (14F/13)	1006+	3300+
5	Cod Island High Point	914+	3000+
6	Cod Island Peak	823+	2700+
7	Cod Island Peak	792+	2600+
8	Drachart Island High Point	726+	2500+

== See also ==
- List of mountain ranges
