= Seal Bight =

Unincorporated community

- Settlement
- Interactive map of Seal Bight
- Coordinates: 52°27′23″N 55°40′56″W
- Country: [Canada]]
- Province: Newfoundland and Labrador
- Region: Labrador
- Area: Murray Harbour
- Time zone: AST (UTC−04:00)
  - Summer (DST): ADT (UTC−03:00)
- Area code(s): 709, 879

Seal Bight is a settlement on Murray Harbour in Newfoundland and Labrador.
