= Mount Battle =

Mountain in Nunavut, Canada

- Location within Nunavut

Highest point
- Elevation: 1,329 m (4,360 ft)
- Coordinates: 66°40′18.1″N 65°03′11.9″W

Geography
- Location: Baffin Island, Nunavut, Canada
- Parent range: Baffin Mountains
- Topo map: NTS 26I11 Mount Asgard

Mount Battle is a mountain located 65 km (40 mi) northeast of Pangnirtung on Baffin Island, Nunavut, Canada. It is part of the Baffin Mountains which in turn form part of the Arctic Cordillera mountain system.

Mount Battle is named for Ben Battle, a geomorphologist from McGill University, who drowned crossing a melt water-swollen stream near Glacier Lake during the 1953 Arctic Institute of North America research-mountaineering expedition.
