= Brave Mountain =

Mountain in Labrador, Canada

- Location within Newfoundland and Labrador

Highest point
- Elevation: 1,300 m (4,300 ft)
- Prominence: 1,270 m (4,170 ft)
- Coordinates: 57°52′53″N 62°01′35″W

Geography
- Location: Labrador, Canada
- Parent range: Kaumajet Mountains
- Topo map: NTS 14E16 Finger Hill

Brave Mountain is a steep mountain, located less than 3 km (2 mi) southwest of Bishop's Mitre in northern Labrador, Canada. It is the highest peak of the Kaumajet Mountains, with an elevation of 1,300 m (4,265 ft), as well as the highest island peak on the Atlantic coast of North America.
