= Bishop's Mitre (Labrador) =

Mountain in Labrador, Canada

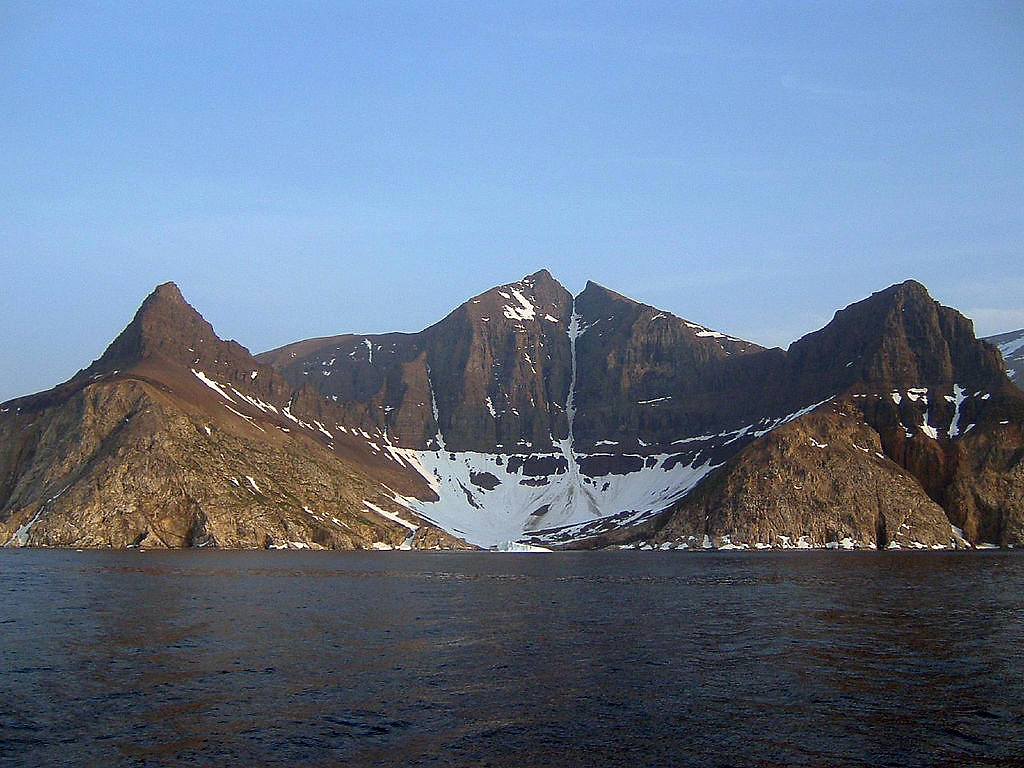
- Bishop's Mitre

Highest point
- Elevation: 1,087 m (3,566 ft)peakvisor
- Prominence: 294 m (965 ft)
- Coordinates: 57°53′46″N 61°58′59″W

Geography
- Location within Newfoundland and Labrador
- Location: Labrador, Canada
- Parent range: Kaumajet Mountains
- Topo map: NTS 14F13 Mugford Harbour

Climbing
- Easiest route: class 3 scramble

Bishop's Mitre is a mountain located 3 km (9,843 ft) east of Brave Mountain on the northern coast of Labrador in the Kaumajet Mountains. Noteworthy for the river carved down its middle, its appearance is like a steep tower, which lies on the north point of Grimmington Island, between Seal Bight and Cod Bag Harbour.
