= Peter Snout =

Mountain in Newfoundland, Canada

Highest point
- Elevation: 496 m (1,627 ft)
- Coordinates: 47°53′59″N 57°56′27″W

Geography
- Location: Newfoundland
- Country: Canada
- Province: Newfoundland and Labrador
- Parent range: Blue Hills of Couteau
- Topo map: NTS 11P13 Peter Snout

Climbing
- Easiest route: class 2 scramble

Peter Snout is a mountain located in southwestern Newfoundland, Canada. It is 496 m (1,627 ft) high and is the central peak of the Blue Hills of Couteau, which are a range in the Appalachian Mountains.

== See also ==
- Mountain peaks of Canada
