= Mount Arthur (Antarctica) =

Mountain in Ross Dependency, Antarctica

Mount Arthur (67°39′S 49°52′E) is a mountain, 1,290 m, just west of Mount Douglas at the west end of the Scott Mountains, Enderby Land in Antarctica. Plotted from air photos taken from ANARE (Australian National Antarctic Research Expeditions) aircraft in 1956. Named by Antarctic Names Committee of Australia (ANCA) for J. Arthur, electrical fitter at Mawson station in 1960.
