= White Crown Mountain =

Mountain in Nunavut, Canada

Highest point
- Elevation: 2,048 m (6,719 ft)
- Prominence: 298 m (978 ft)
- Coordinates: 79°55′36″N 092°19′18″W

Geography
- Location: Axel Heiberg Island, Nunavut, Canada
- Parent range: Princess Margaret Range
- Topo map: NTS 59G16 White Crown Mountain

White Crown Mountain is a mountain in the Princess Margaret Range on Axel Heiberg Island, Nunavut, Canada. It is located on the southwestern edge of the Muller Icecap and is surrounded by glaciers.
