= Mount Arthur (Nunavut) =

Mountain in Nunavut, Canada

- Location within Nunavut

Highest point
- Elevation: 1,310 m (4,300 ft)
- Coordinates: 81°19′59″N 74°46′01″W

Geography
- Location: Nunavut, Canada
- Parent range: Arctic Cordillera
- Topo map: NTS 340D7 Mount Sherwood

Climbing
- First ascent: July 1882

Mount Arthur is a mountain located on Ellesmere Island, Nunavut, Canada in the Quttinirpaaq National Park. First mapped by the Lady Franklin Bay Expedition, it was named for Chester A. Arthur the 21st President of the United States.
