= Breidablik Peak =

Mountain in Nunavut, Canada

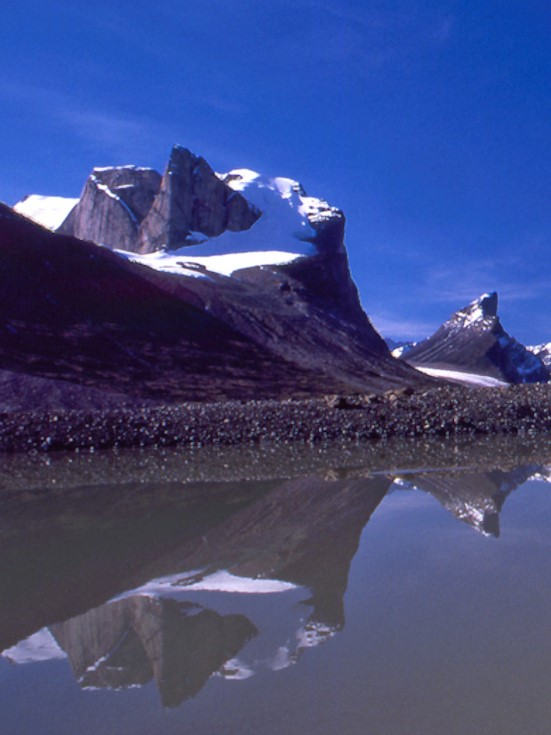
- Breidablik and Thor Peaks, Auyuittuq N. P.

Highest point
- Elevation: 1,650 m (5,410 ft)
- Prominence: 130 m (430 ft)
- Coordinates: 66°34′01.2″N 65°13′58.8″W

Geography
- Location: Baffin Island, Nunavut, Canada
- Parent range: Baffin Mountains
- Topo map: NTS 26I11 Mount Asgard

Breidablik Peak is a mountain on Baffin Island, located 51 km (32 mi) northeast of Pangnirtung, Nunavut, Canada. It lies in the southern Baffin Mountains which in turn form part of the Arctic Cordillera mountain system. Like Mounts Odin and Asgard and other peaks in the Arctic Cordillera, its name comes from Norse mythology. It is named after Breidablik, the home of Baldr.
