= Mount Beaufort =

Mountain in Nunavut, Canada

- Location within Nunavut

Highest point
- Elevation: 400 m (1,300 ft)
- Coordinates: 81°54′N 63°30′W

Geography
- Location: Nunavut, Canada
- Parent range: Arctic Cordillera
- Topo map: NTS 120D13 Cape Beechey

Mount Beaufort is a mountain located on Ellesmere Island, Nunavut, Canada and was named after Francis Beaufort. The mountain was first sighted by Elisha Kane in 1845 and named Mount Francis Beaufort.
