= Mount Albert (Quebec) =

Mountain in Quebec, Canada

Mont Albert
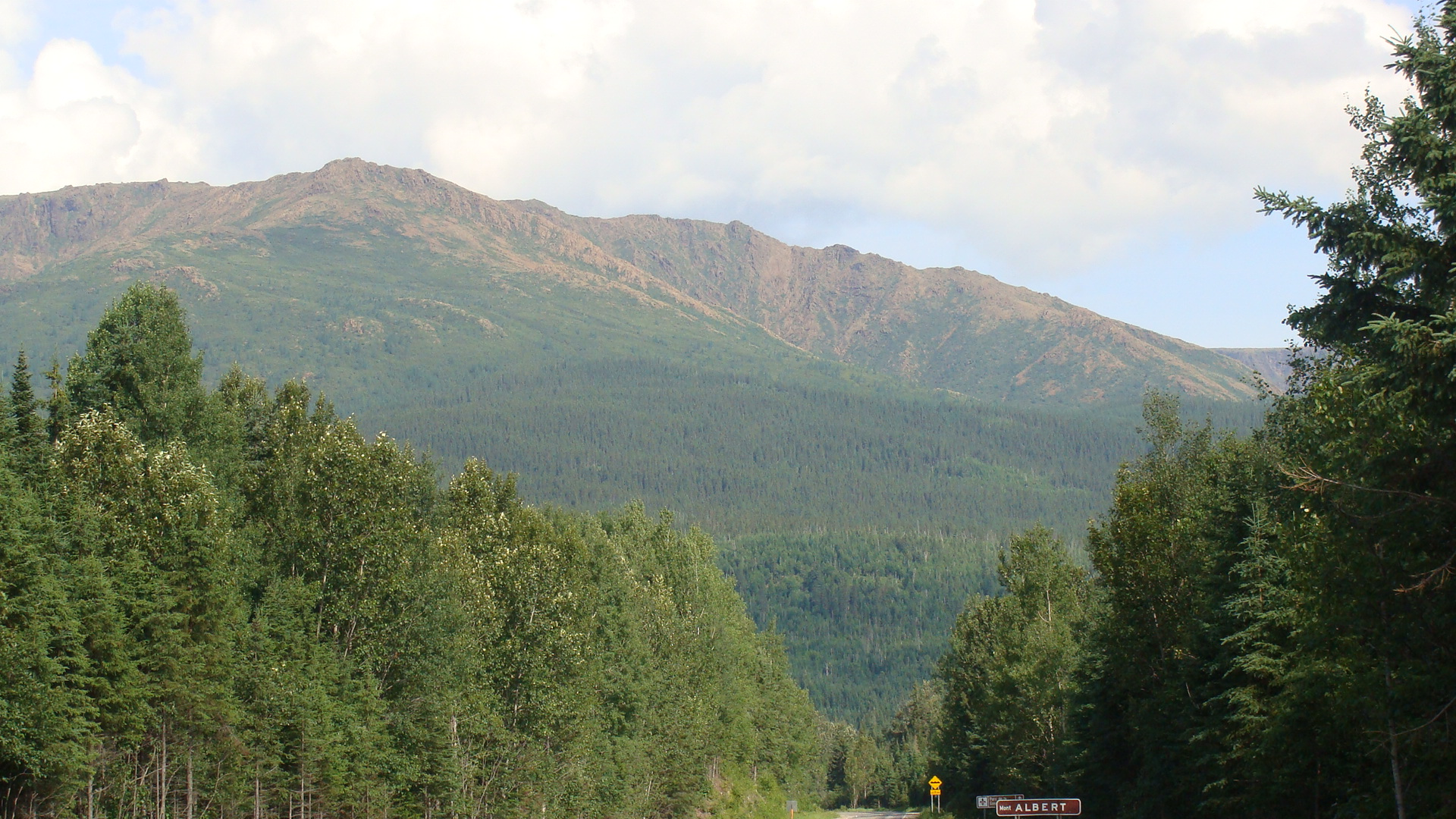

Highest point
- Elevation: 1,151 m (3,776 ft)
- Prominence: 740m
- Listing: Quebec 1000 meter peaks List of mountains in Canada
- Coordinates: 48°55′17″N 66°11′42″W

Geography
- Location within Quebec
- Interactive map of Mont Albert
- Location: Mont-Albert, Quebec, Canada
- Parent range: Chic-Choc Mountains
- Topo map: NTS 22B16 Mont Albert

Climbing
- First ascent: August 26, 1845 by Alexander Murray

Mont Albert (English: Mount Albert) is a mountain in the Chic-Choc range in the Gaspésie National Park in the Gaspé Peninsula of eastern Quebec, Canada. At 1,151 m (3,776 ft), it is one of the highest mountains in southern Quebec, and is popular for hiking.

Mount Albert was named in honour of Prince Albert of Saxe-Coburg and Gotha, husband of Queen Victoria, because geologist Alexander Murray made the first recorded ascent of the mountain on the Prince's birthday, 26 Aug. 1845.

== Geography ==
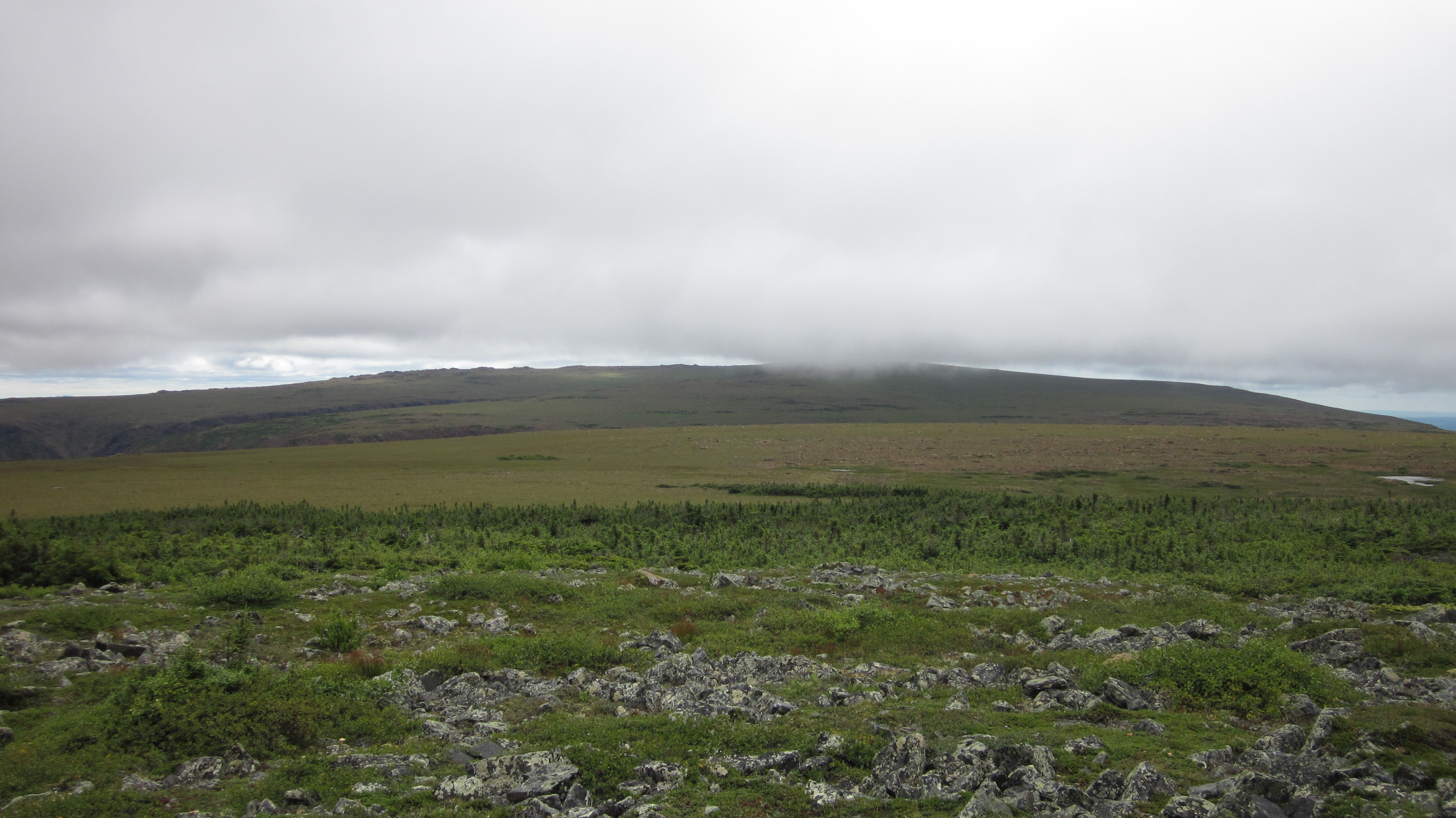
Southern summit of Mount Albert and Moses's table.

The summit of Mount Albert is a plateau 13 km^{2} (5.02 sq mi) in area called La Table à Moïse, or Moses's Table. It includes two summits, Albert North (1,070 m (3,510 ft)) and Albert South (1,151–1,154 m (3,776–3,786 ft)). Each of the summits is situated at either side of the plateau.

The principal component of Mont Albert is an unusual kind of bedrock called serpentine; this originated as oceanic crust and was then uplifted during the formation of the Appalachian Mountains about 480 million years ago. The nearly flat serpentine tableland on the mountain's summit is an alpine tundra area above the tree line, and supports a quite distinctive flora with many kinds of endemic and highly disjunct plants.

The ascent of Mount Albert from near sea level is challenging, but popular with hikers, offering a view of the St. Lawrence and the Côte-Nord, the river's north shore, part of the ancient bedrock of the Canadian Shield.

== Gallery ==
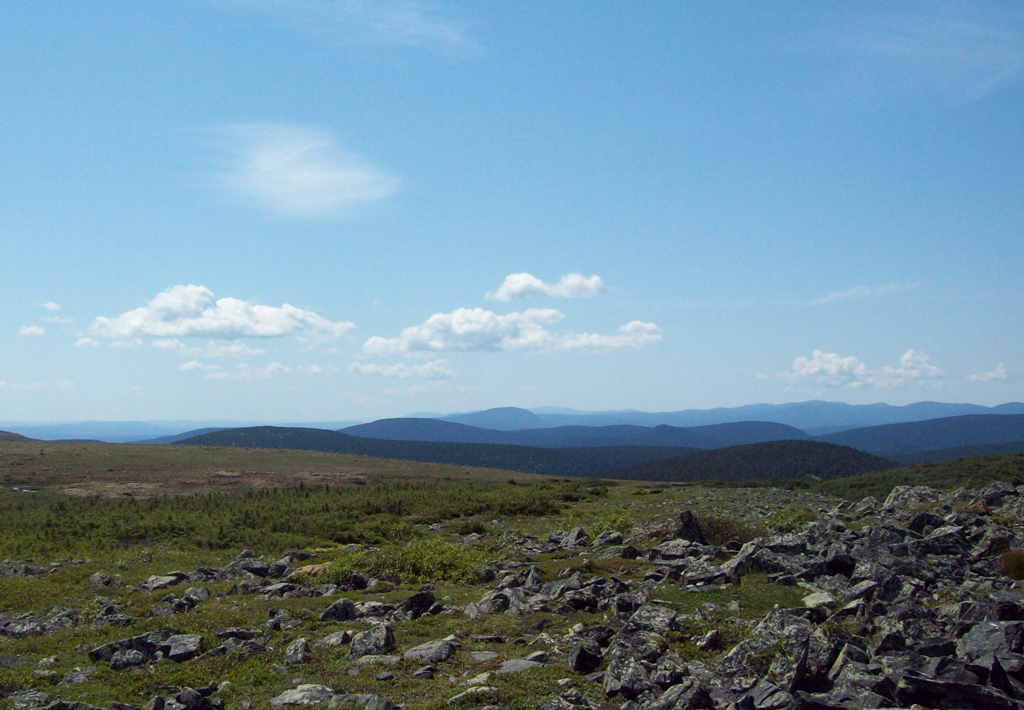
Plateau at the summit of Mount Albert

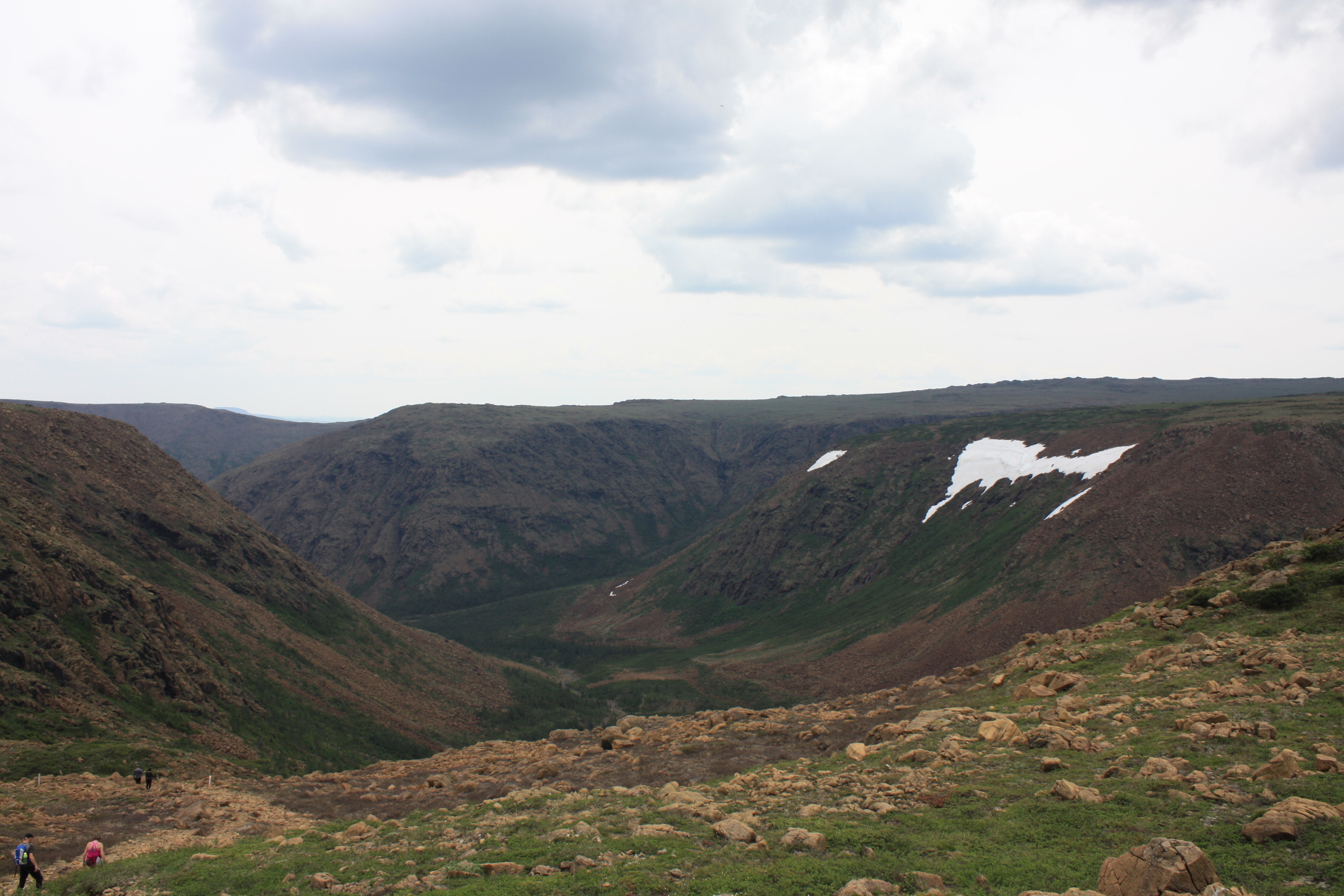
Grande Cuve of Mount Albert

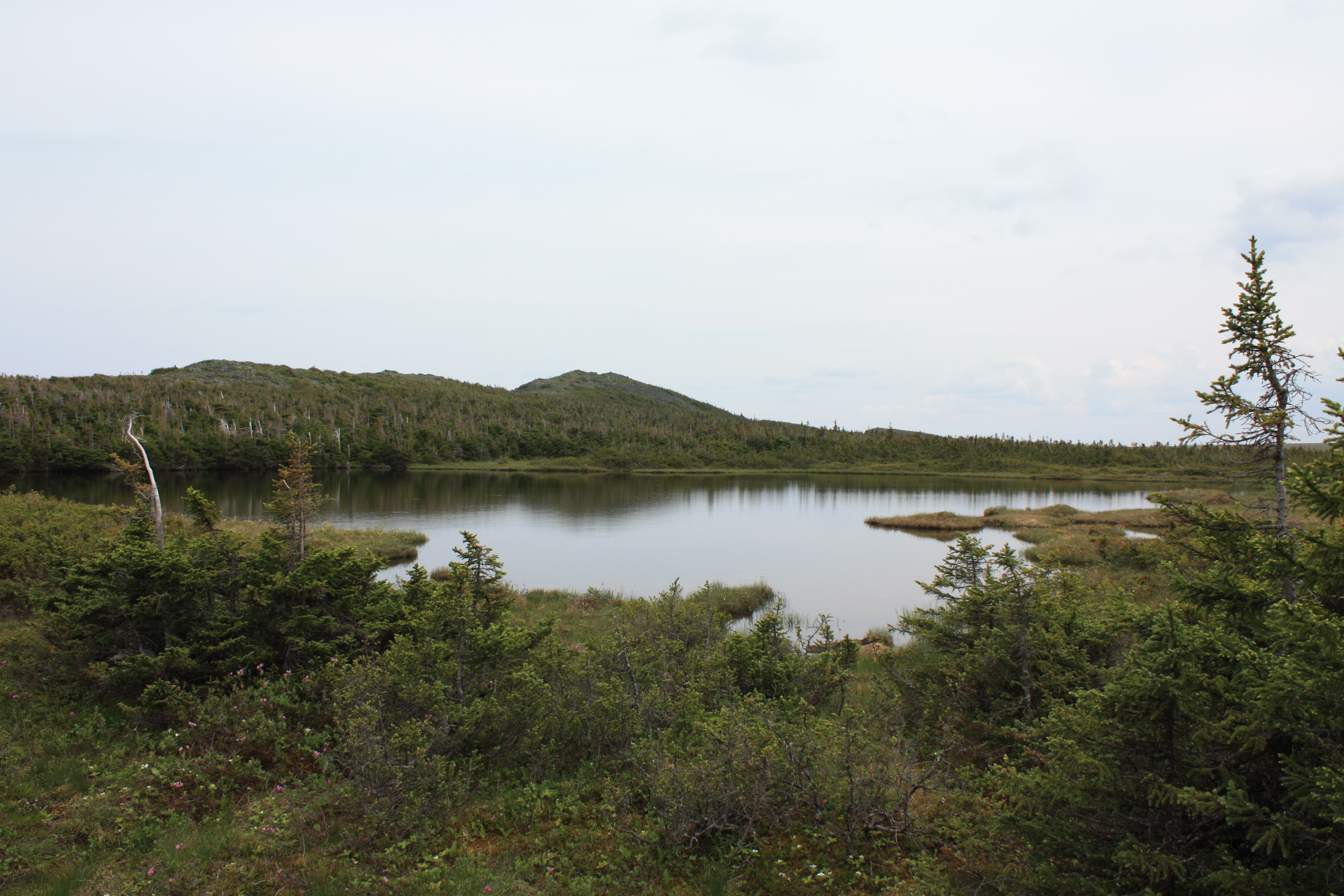
Lake on the plateau at the summit of Mount Albert

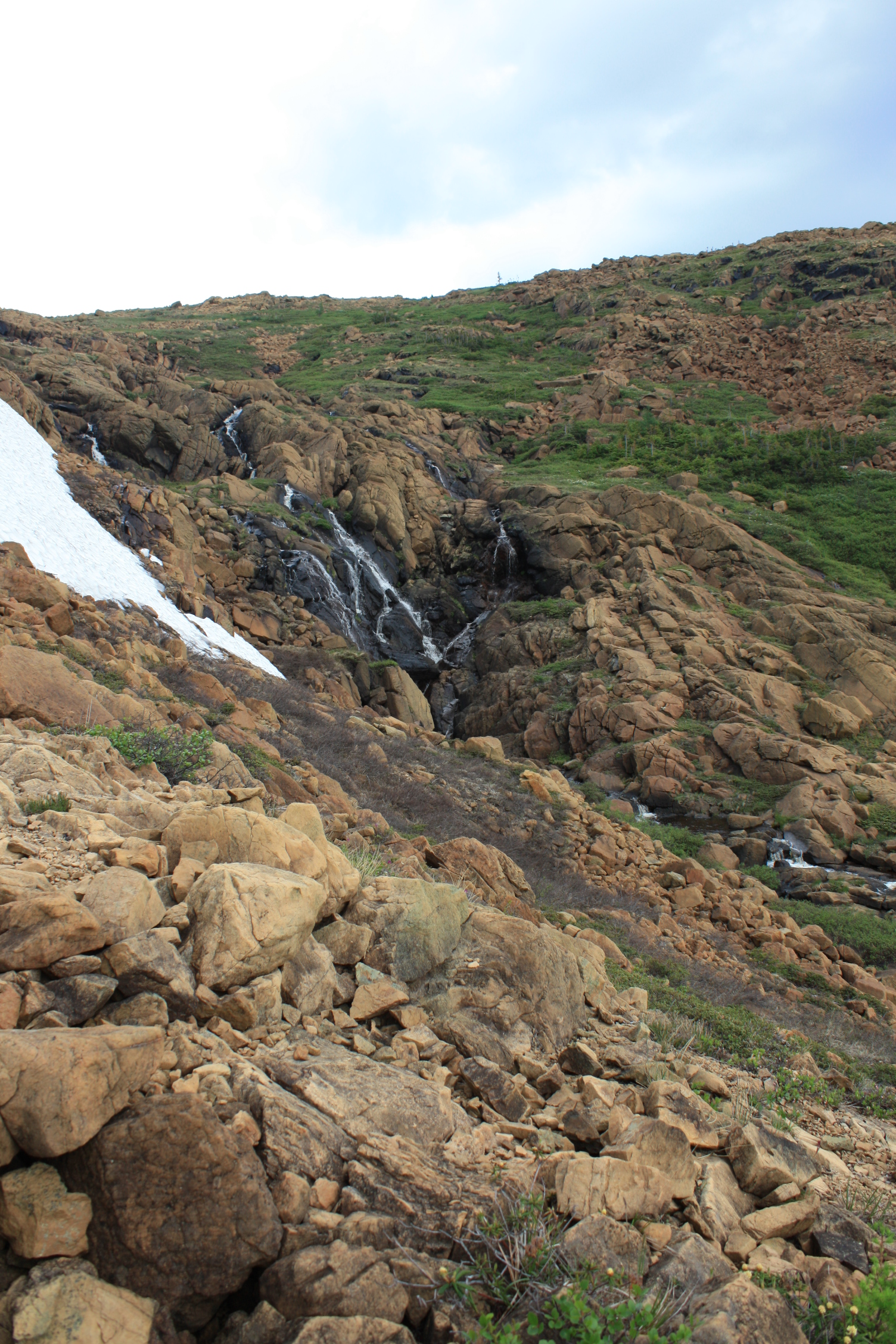
Snowpack and waterfall, Grande Cuve, Mount Albert

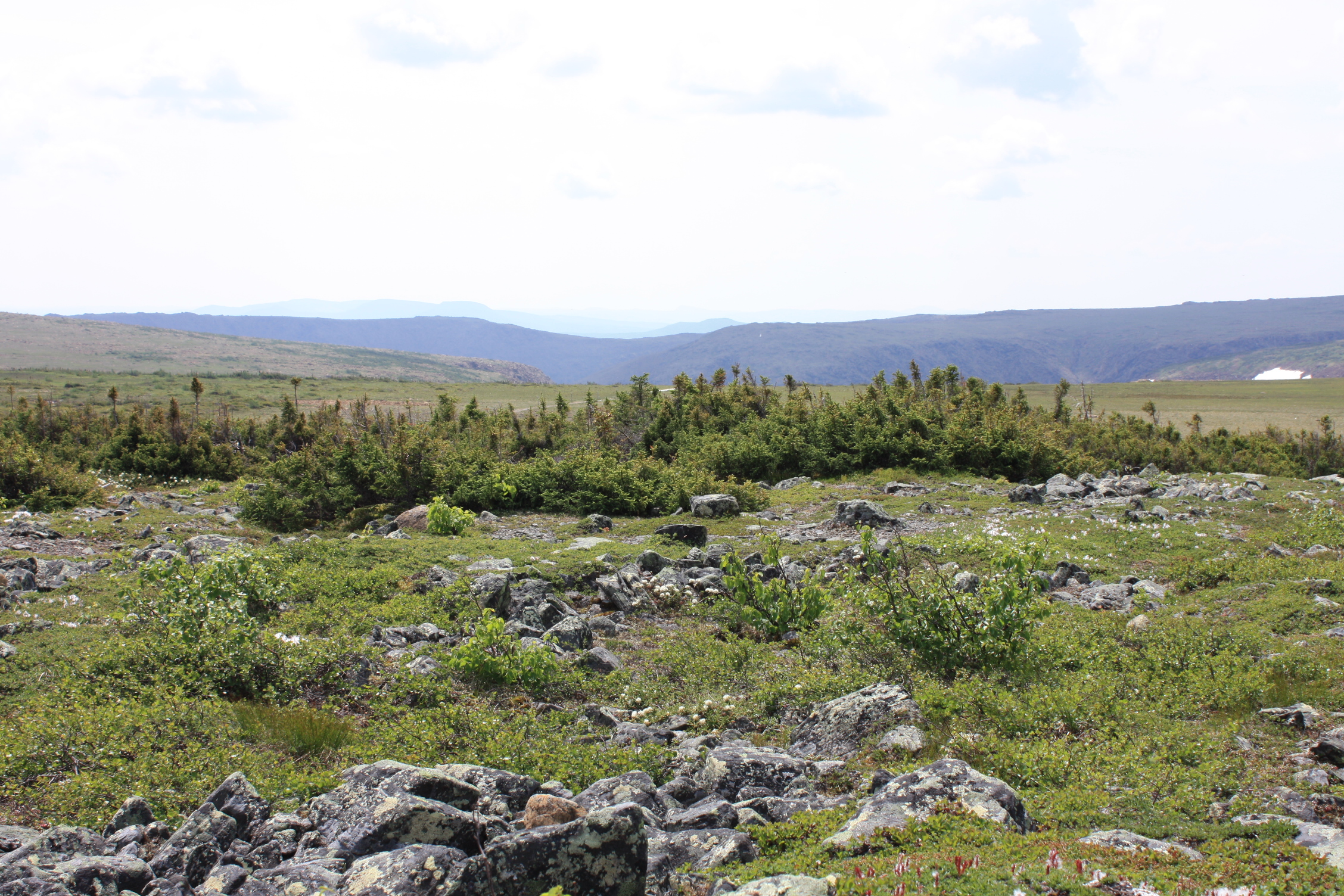
Shrubs on the plateau at the summit of Mount Albert

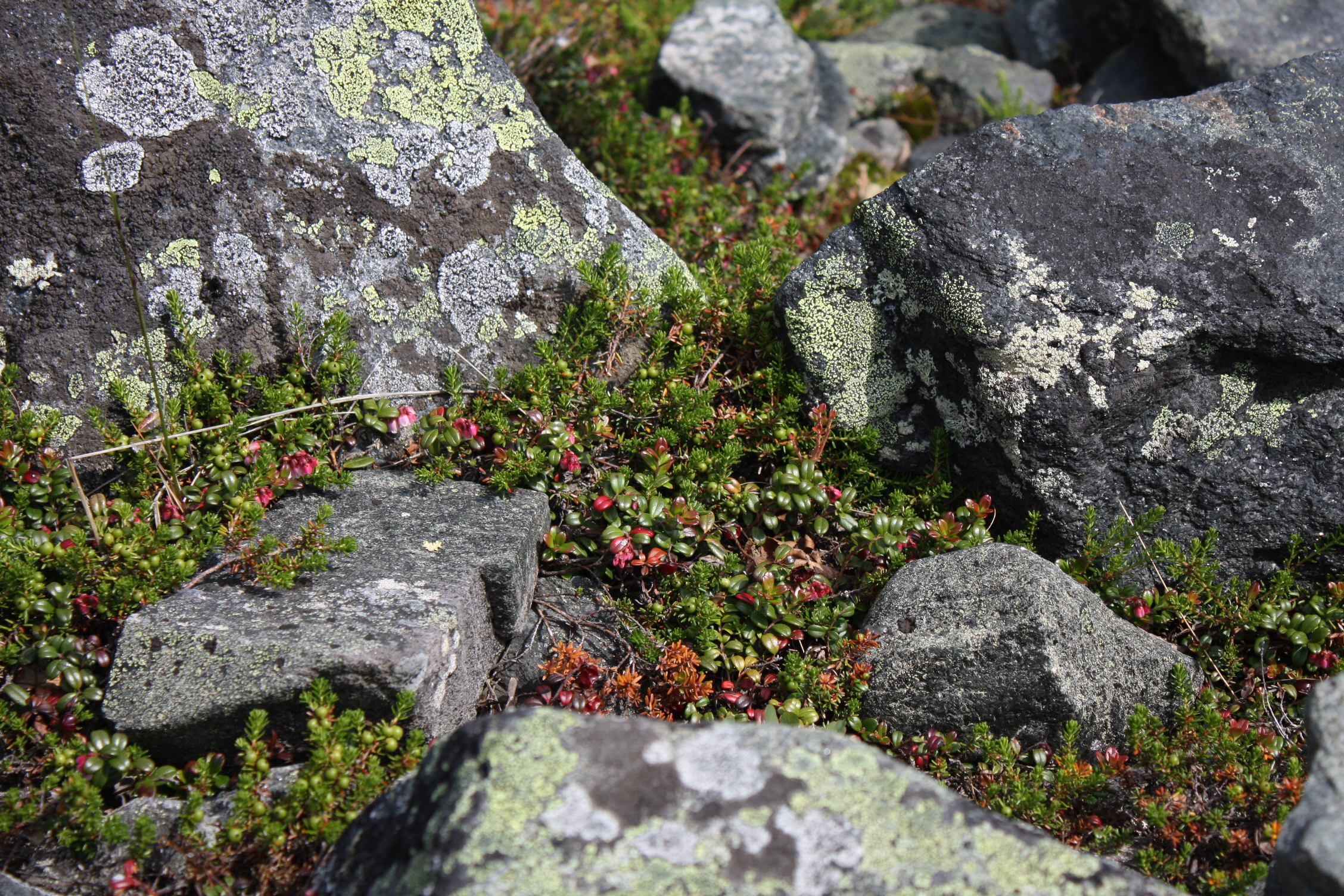
Flora on Mount Albert

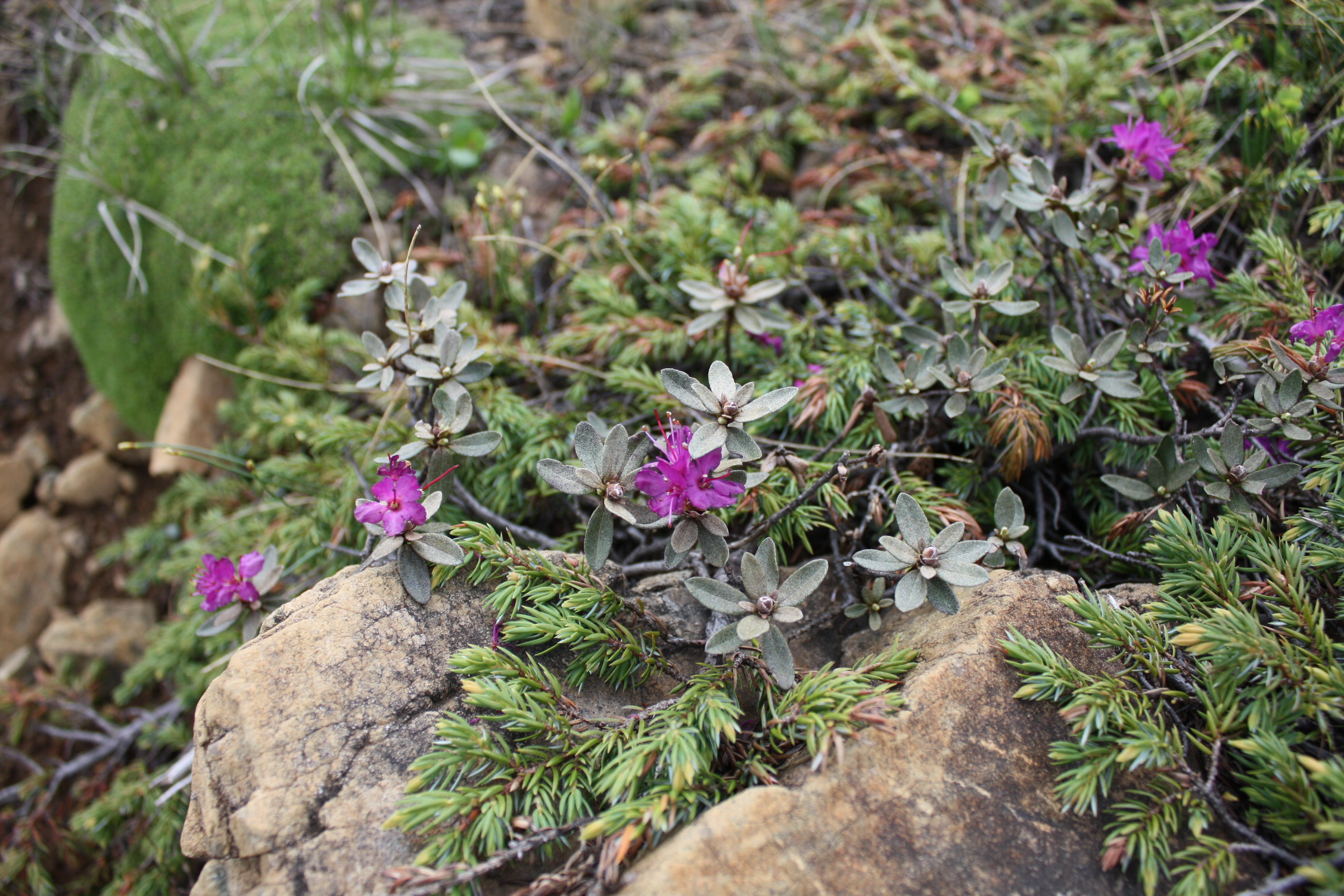
Flora, Grande Cuve, Mount Albert

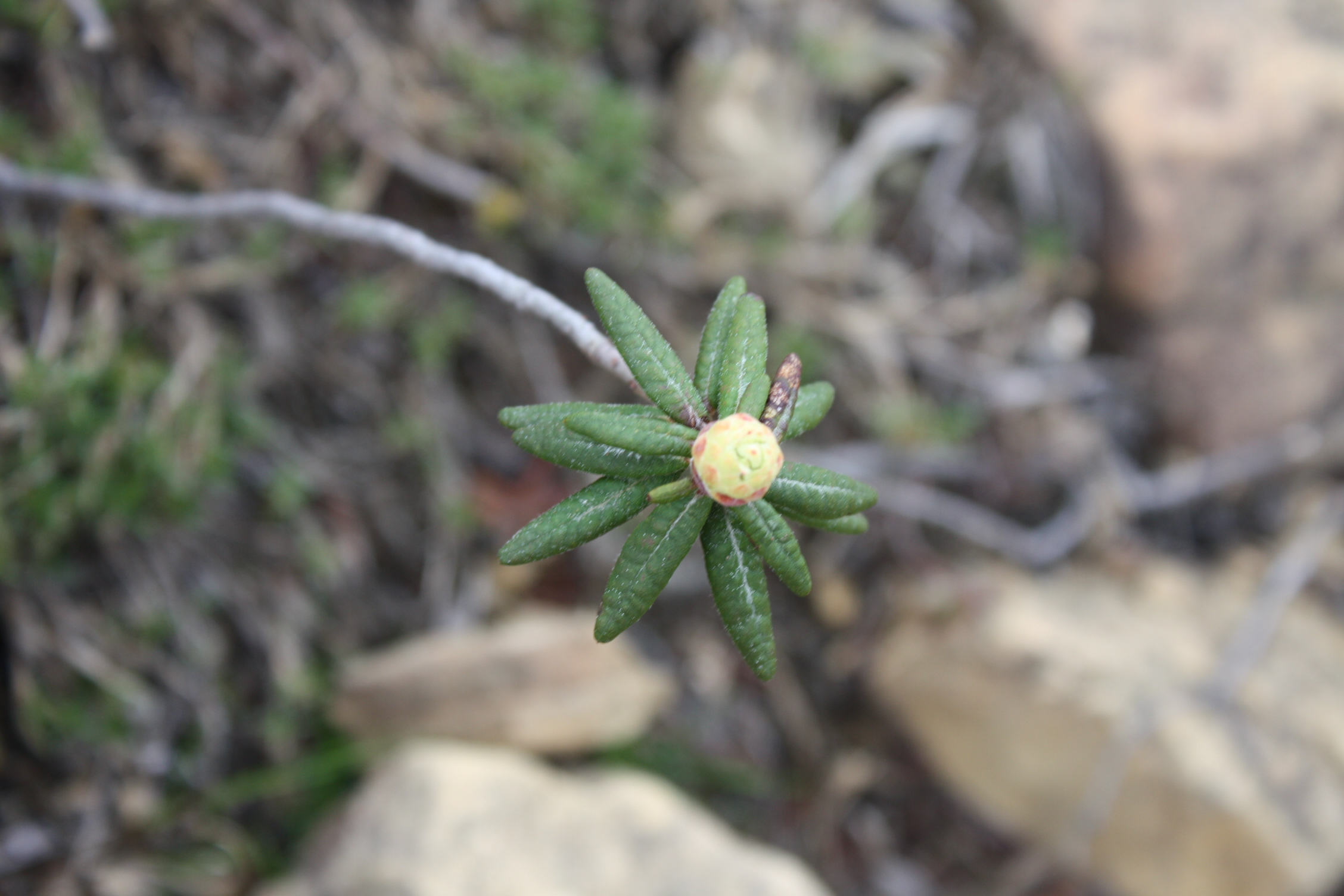
Flora, Grande Cuve, Mount Albert
