= Chic-Choc Mountains =

Subrange of the Appalachian Mountains in Quebec, Canada

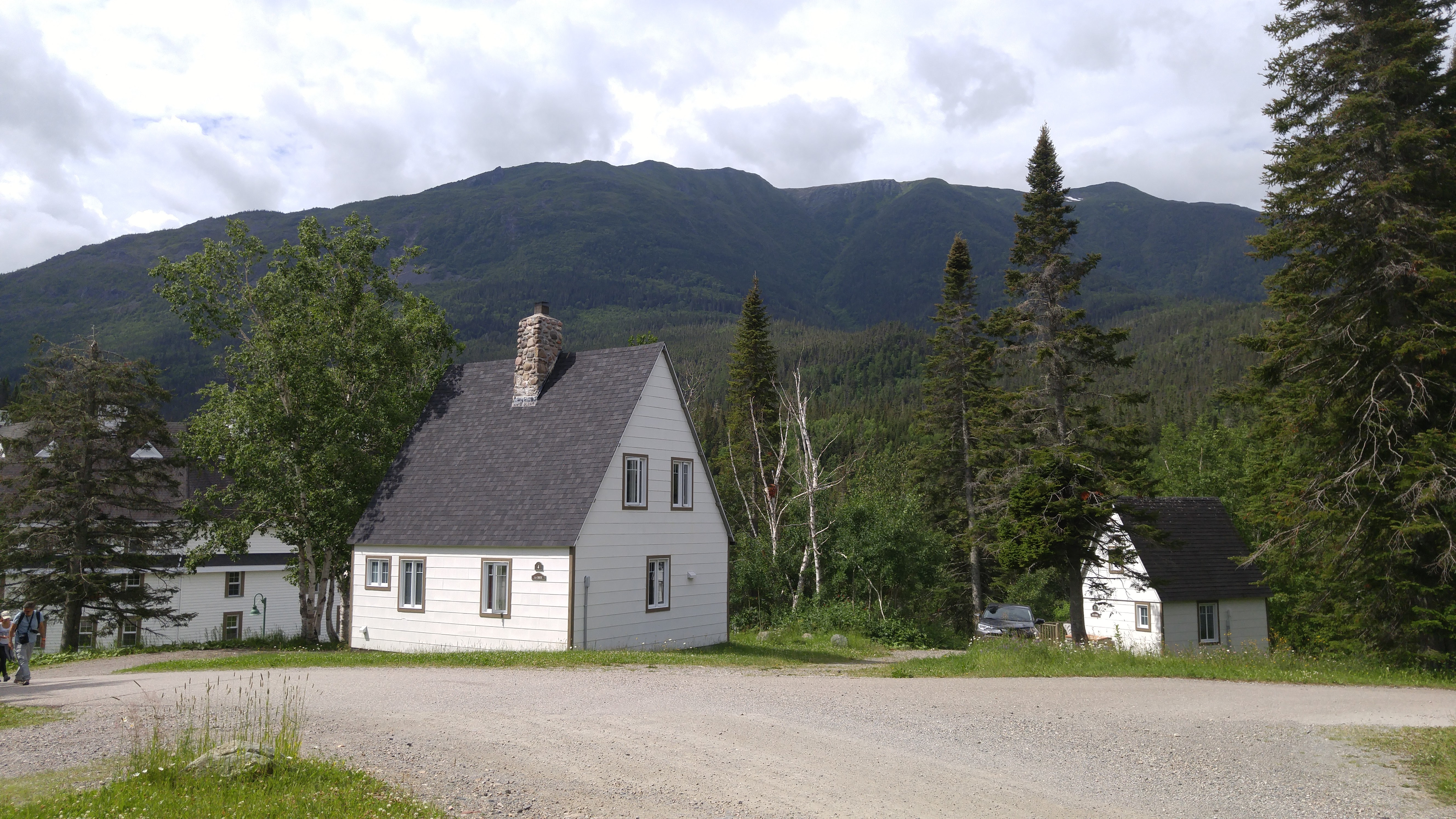

Highest point
- Peak: Mount Jacques-Cartier
- Elevation: 1,268 m (4,160 ft)
- Coordinates: 48°59′26″N 65°56′33″W

Dimensions
- Length: 95 km (59 mi) East-West
- Width: 10 km (6.2 mi)

Geography
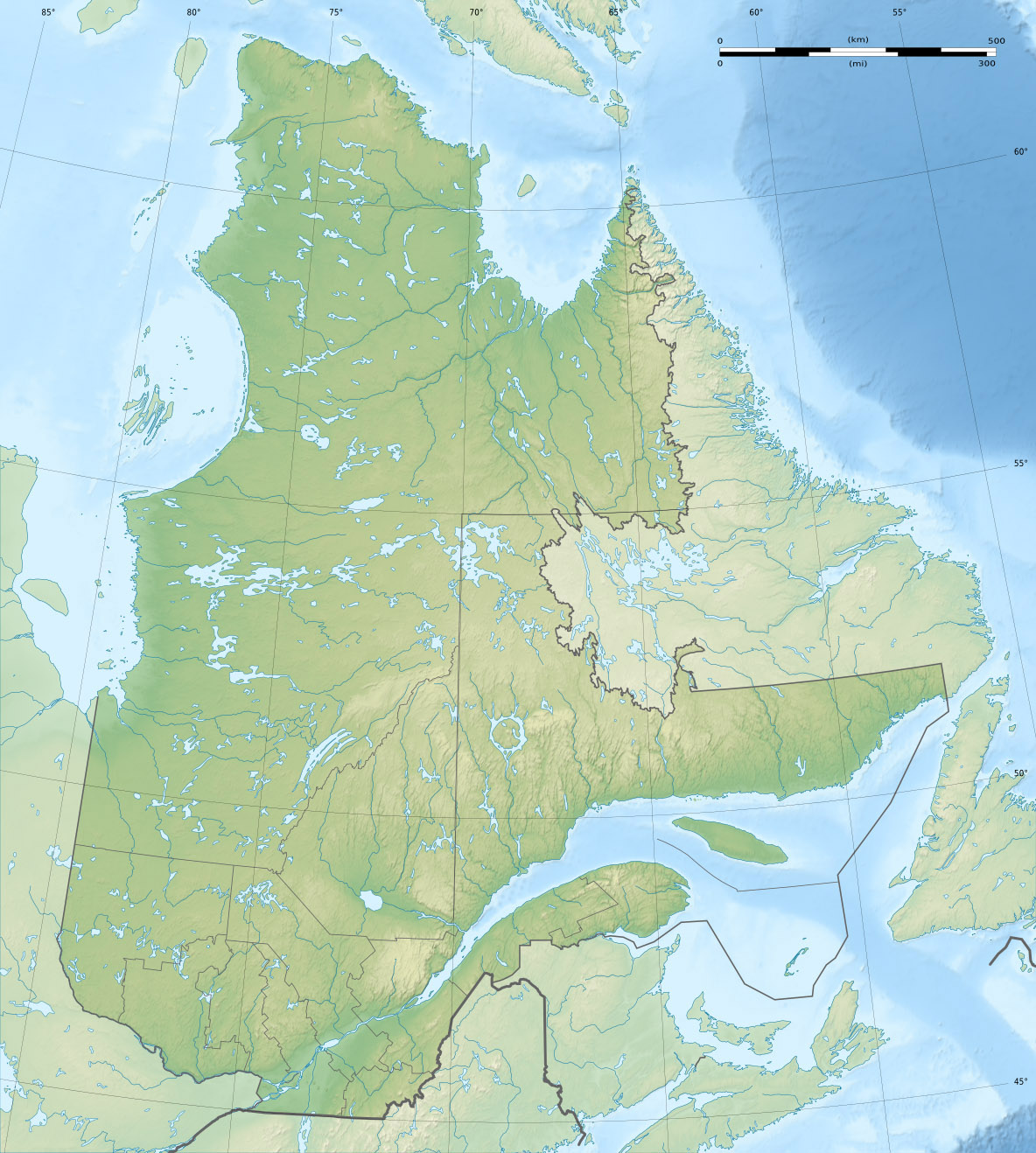
- Location within Quebec Location within Canada
- Country: Canada
- Region: Quebec
- Range coordinates: 48°55′N 66°00′W
- Parent range: Notre Dame Mountains

The Chic-Choc Mountains, also spelled Shick Shocks, form a mountain range in the central region of the Gaspe Peninsula in Quebec, Canada. It is a part of the Notre Dame Mountains, which are a subrange of the Appalachians.

== History ==
The name Chic-Chocs comes from the Mi'kmaq word sigsôg, meaning "crags" or "rocky mountains." It has undergone many different spellings over time, including Chikchâks (1836), Shick-shock (1857), and Chick-Saws (1863).

== Geography ==
The Chic-Chocs run parallel to the St. Lawrence River and are located some 20 to 40 kilometers inland. They are a narrow band of mountains approximately 95 kilometres (59 mi) long and 10 kilometres (6.2 mi) wide. The Chic-Chocs are heavily eroded, with rounded, flattened tops and steep sides. Over 32 mountains in the range have peaks higher than 1,000 metres (3,300 ft); the highest is Mount Jacques-Cartier at 1,268 metres (4,160 ft). Caribou can be found in the plateaus of this region.

== Tourism ==
Although visited by just a few tourists, Chic-Choc Mountains became much more popular in the late 1990s as backcountry skiing gained popularity in Eastern Canada.

Some of the most popular backcountry skiing areas in the region include Mont Hogs Back, Mont Albert, Champ Mars, Mount Logan, and Mines Madeleine.

The mountains near Mont Saint Pierre are a destination for ice climbers.

A network of trails, including the International Appalachian Trail, passes through these mountains. Quebec's Parc national de la Gaspésie protects most of the mountain range.

== Gallery ==
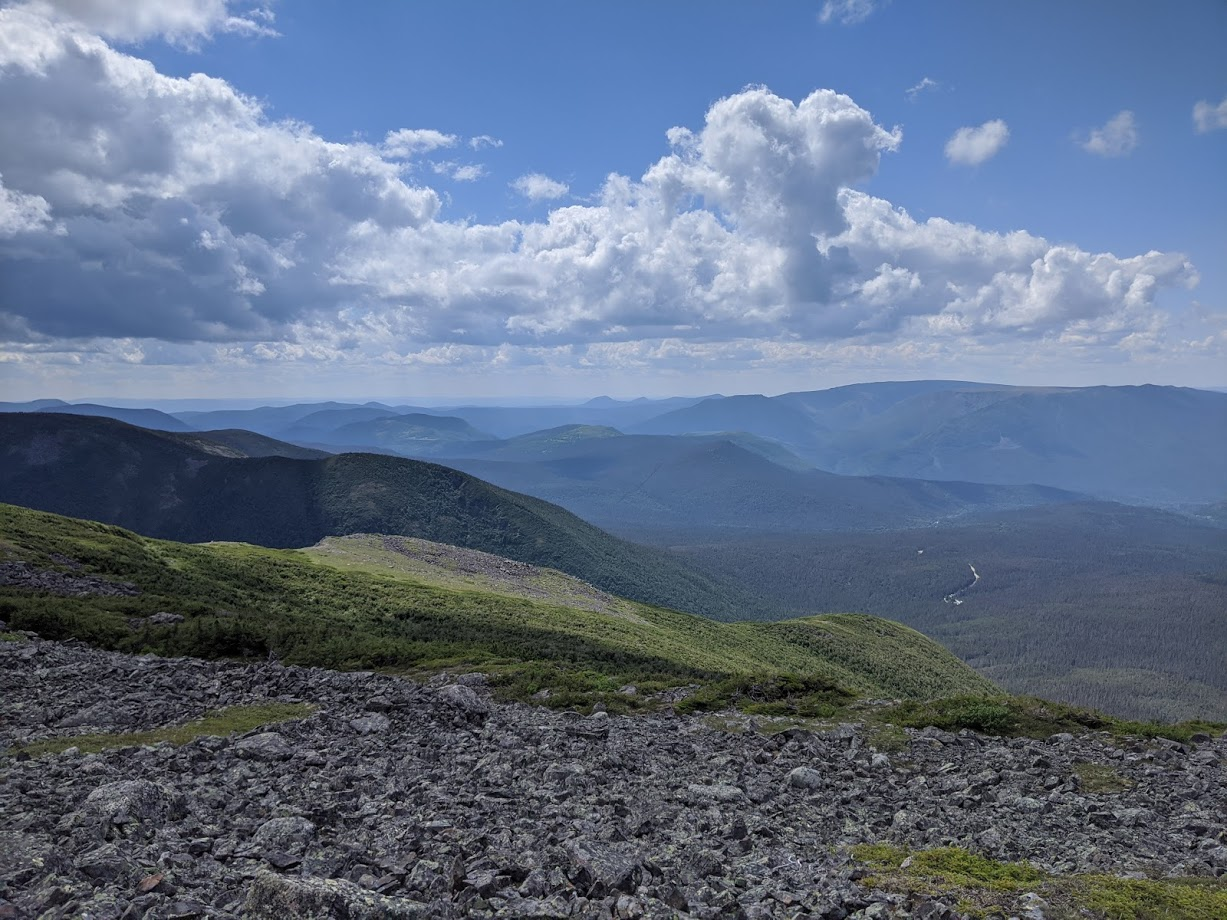
Chic-choc from Mont Xalibu

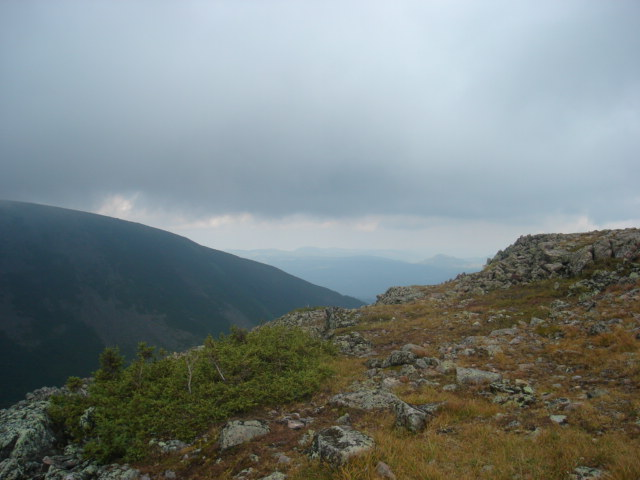
View from Mont Jacques-Cartier

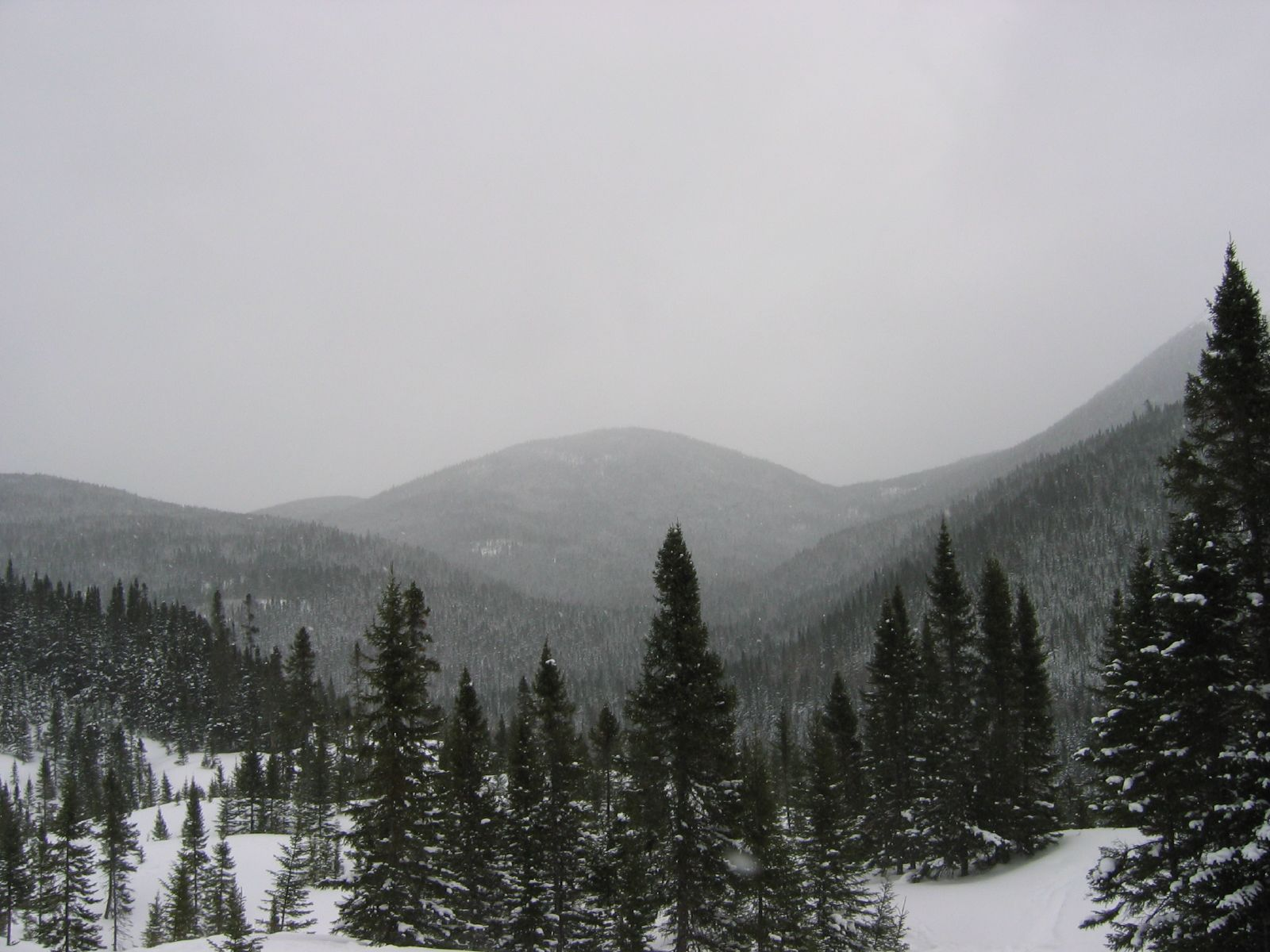
Winter in the Chic Choc Mountains

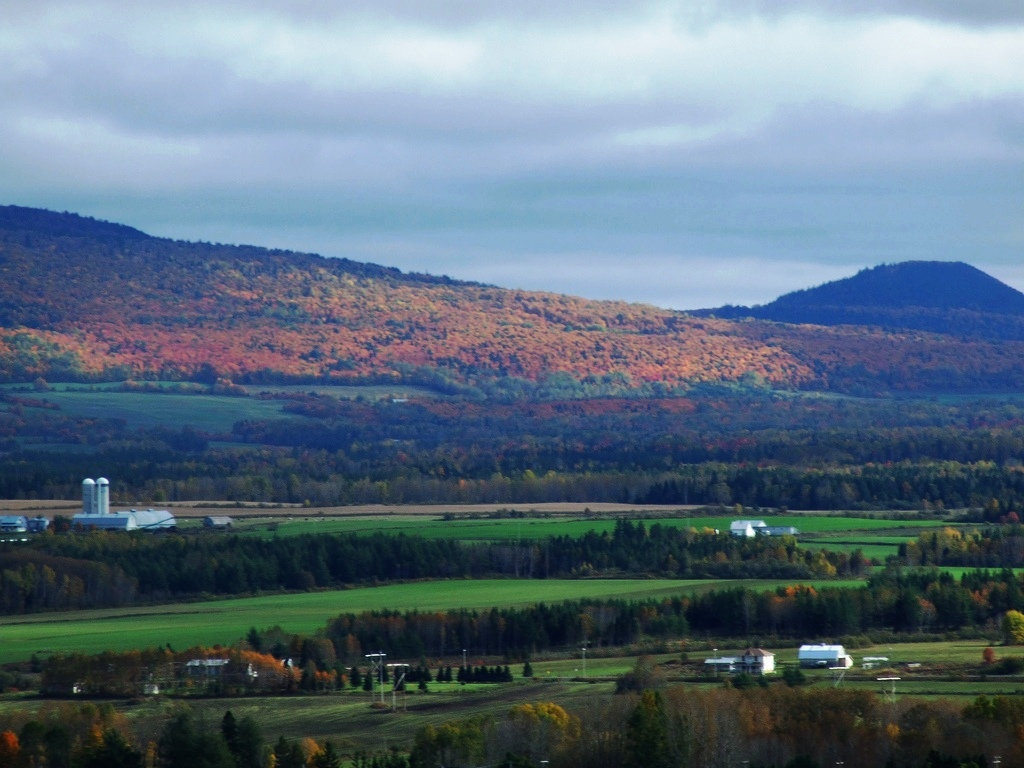
Near Sayabec

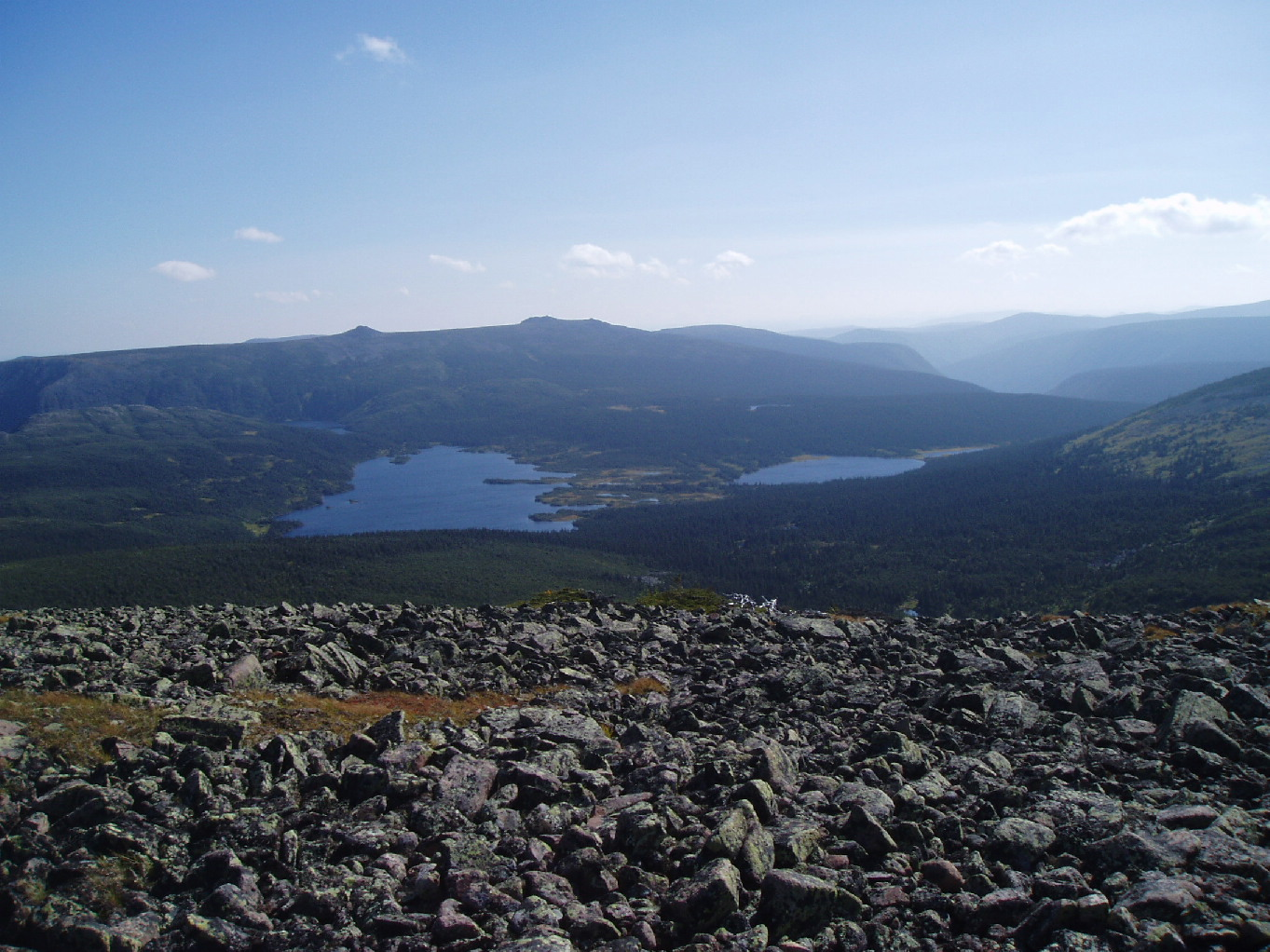
Parc de la Gaspésie

== See also ==
- Appalachian Uplands
- List of subranges of the Appalachian Mountains
- Jacques Cartier
