= Tathagata Tower =

Mountain in Canada

Highest point
- Elevation: 2,590 m (8,500 ft)
- Prominence: 70 m (230 ft)
- Parent peak: Mount Sir James MacBrien
- Coordinates: 62.1175°N 127.6995°W

Geography
- Country: Canada
- Territory: Northwest Territories
- Parent range: Mackenzie Mountains
- Topo map: NTS 95L4 Mount Sir James MacBrien

Climbing
- First ascent: July 16, 1960, William J. Buckingham and party
- Easiest route: North Ridge

Tathagata Tower is a peak in the Cirque of the Unclimbables, Northwest Territories, Canada. The peak is on a ridge one kilometer to the southwest of Mount Sir James MacBrien, its parent, and has an elevation of 2590 meters.

== Climbing history ==
On July 16th, 1960 members of the Bill Buckingham party completed a first ascent of Tathagata Tower as part of their expedition to the Cirque of the Unclimbables. On the morning of the 16th, the party logged a first ascent of the nearby Parrot Beak Peak and, from the summit, observed two other spires to the south that appeared climbable - Tathagata Tower and Lotus Flower Tower. The group attempted Tathagata first and ascended via the North Ridge, consisting of a combination of challenging crack and face climbing pitches. Upon reaching the summit, the team descended via the South Ridge and proceeded to Lotus Flower Tower.

In July of 1977, the peak was climbed for the second time by Renzo Lorenzi and his party via the east face.
