= Phenocryst Spire =

Mountain in Canada

Highest point
- Elevation: 2,430 m (7,970 ft)
- Prominence: 80 m (260 ft)
- Parent peak: Mount Meringue
- Coordinates: 62.1100°N 127.7013°W

Geography
- Country: Canada
- Territory: Northwest Territories
- Parent range: Mackenzie Mountains
- Topo map: NTS 95L4 Mount Sir James MacBrien

Climbing
- First ascent: July 12, 1960; Bill Buckingham and party
- Easiest route: West Ridge

Phenocryst Spire is a peak in the Cirque of the Unclimbables, Northwest Territories, Canada. The peak is on a ridge 1.1 kilometers to the northeast of Mount Meringue, its parent, and has an elevation of 2430 meters.

== Climbing history ==
On July 12, 1960 the Bill Buckingham party completed a first ascent of Phenocryst Spire via the West Ridge as part of their expedition to the Cirque of the Unclimbables, and following a successful ascent of Mount Meringue earlier in the day. The team accessed the peak by rappelling from the summit of Mount Meringue onto the saddle separating it from Phenocryst, then using a mixture of crack and face climbing techniques to reach the summit.

In the years since the first ascent, the peak has seen several other ascents via the East Ridge and the South Buttress, as well as the establishment of a 1,500 foot, 24 pitch route by Mark Reeves and Steve Sinfield in 2001 which they named The Hustler.
