= Ziegeberg =

Mountain in Canada

Highest point
- Elevation: 2,410 m (7,910 ft)
- Prominence: 80 m (260 ft)
- Parent peak: Mount Sir James MacBrien
- Coordinates: 62.1267°N 127.6618°W

Geography
- Country: Canada
- Territory: Northwest Territories
- Parent range: Mackenzie Mountains
- Topo map: NTS 95L4 Mount Sir James MacBrien

Climbing
- First ascent: July 11, 1960; Bill Buckingham and party
- Easiest route: East Ridge

Ziegeberg is a peak in the Cirque of the Unclimbables, Northwest Territories, Canada. The peak is on a ridge 700 meters to the northeast of Mount Sir James MacBrien, its parent, and has an elevation of 2410 meters.

== Climbing history ==
On July 11, 1960 Bill Buckingham, Mason Hoadley, and Stuart Krebs completed a first ascent of Ziegeberg by traversing its eastern ridge following a successful ascent of nearby Trident Peak earlier in the day. The peak has seen few if any recorded ascents in the years since.
