= Huey Spires =

Mountain in Canada

Highest point
- Elevation: 2,330 m (7,640 ft)
- Prominence: 20 m (66 ft)
- Parent peak: Mount Meringue
- Coordinates: 62.1092°N 127.687°W

Geography
- Country: Canada
- Territory: Northwest Territories
- Parent range: Mackenzie Mountains
- Topo map: NTS 95L4 Mount Sir James MacBrien

Climbing
- First ascent: July 4, 1960; Bill Buckingham and party

The Huey Spires are a series of three peaks in the Cirque of the Unclimbables, Northwest Territories, Canada. The peaks are on a ridge 2 kilometers to the northeast of Mount Meringue, their parent, and have a maximum elevation of 2330 meters. The spires do not have individual names, but are referred to by climbers as the East, Middle, and West spires.

== Climbing history ==
Of the three spires, the Middle and East spires were the first to be climbed by the Bill Buckingham party in the summer of 1960. The West Spire remained unclimbed for another fifteen years until it was summitted by Ruedi Hormberger, Hans Ueli Brunner, and Paul Muggli in 1975. In the decades since, many new routes have been established on the spires including Riders on the Storm and Don't Panic It's Organic on the East spire and Power of Silence on the Middle Spire.
