= List of museums in Bosnia and Herzegovina =

This is a list of museums in Bosnia and Herzegovina.

- National Museum of Bosnia and Herzegovina in Sarajevo
- National Gallery of Bosnia and Herzegovina in Sarajevo
- Museum of Crimes Against Humanity and Genocide in Sarajevo

- Sarajevo 80s Museum in Sarajevo

- Gazi Husrev-bey Museum in Sarajevo
- Historical Museum of Bosnia and Herzegovina in Sarajevo
- The Herzegovina Museum in Mostar
- Museum of Sarajevo in Sarajevo
- Museum of the Old Bridge in Mostar
- Museum of the National Struggle for Liberation in Jajce
- Museum of Modern Art of Republika Srpska in Banja Luka, Republika Srpska
- Museum of Old Herzegovina in Foča, Republika Srpska
- Izetbegović's museum
- Jewish Museum of Bosnia and Herzegovina in Sarajevo
- Planet Sarajevo in Sarajevo
- Sarajevo Winter Olympics Museum in Sarajevo
- Sarajevo VRX Immersive Museum in Sarajevo
- Sarajevo War Tunnel in Sarajevo
- Ars Aevi in Sarajevo
- Sarajevo Brewery Museum in Sarajevo
- Sevdah Art House in Sarajevo
- Museum of Optical Illusions Sarajevo in Sarajevo
- Museum of Literature and Theater Arts of Bosnia and Herzegovina in Sarajevo
- Svrzo House (Svirzina Kuća) in Sarajevo
- Despić House (Despića Kuća) in Sarajevo
- War Childhood Museum in Sarajevo
- Ex-Yu Rock Centar (Opened 2022, closed 2025)
- Museum of the First Proletarian Brigade, Rudo in Rudo, Republika Srpska

== See also ==
- List of National Monuments of Bosnia and Herzegovina
- List of World Heritage Sites in Bosnia and Herzegovina
- List of archives in Bosnia and Herzegovina
- List of libraries in Bosnia and Herzegovina
- Architecture of Bosnia and Herzegovina
