= Unicorn Peak (Canada) =

Mountain in Canada

Highest point
- Elevation: 2,200 m (7,200 ft)
- Prominence: 10 m (33 ft)
- Parent peak: Crescent Peak
- Coordinates: 62.1063°N 127.6437°W

Geography
- Country: Canada
- Territory: Northwest Territories
- Parent range: Mackenzie Mountains
- Topo map: NTS 95L4 Mount Sir James MacBrien

Climbing
- First ascent: 1988, George Bell and Don Mank
- Easiest route: South Ridge

Unicorn Peak is a peak in the Cirque of the Unclimbables, Northwest Territories, Canada. The peak is on a ridge 500 meters to the southwest of Crescent Peak, its parent, and has an elevation of 2200 meters. While Unicorn Peak does not qualify as a distinct summit on account of its low prominence (10 meters), it is regarded as a distinct objective by climbers from the nearby Crescent Peak.

== Climbing history ==
The first recorded ascent of Unicorn Peak was made by George Bell and Don Mank in 1988 via the South Ridge. The team reported the route as consisting of a relatively easy scramble followed by a moderate crux pitch to the summit. Owing to the relatively low difficulty of the route, the peak has seen many subsequent ascents in the years since.
