= Gargoyle Peak =

Mountain in Canada

Highest point
- Elevation: 2,530 m (8,300 ft)
- Prominence: 180 m (590 ft)
- Parent peak: Mount Nirvana
- Coordinates: 61.8579°N 127.6631°W

Geography
- Country: Canada
- Territory: Northwest Territories
- Parent range: Mackenzie Mountains
- Topo map: NTS 95E13 Mount Sidney Dobson

Gargoyle Peak is a peak in the Ragged Range, Northwest Territories, Canada. The peak is 2.1 kilometers to the southeast of Mount Nirvana, its parent, and has an elevation of 2530 meters. The peak is the highest point along Gargoyle Ridge, a well-known landmark for climbers attempting the surrounding peaks
