= Echelon Spires =

Mountain in Canada

Highest point
- Elevation: 2,370 m (7,780 ft)
- Prominence: 100 m (330 ft)
- Parent peak: Pentadactyl Spires
- Coordinates: 62.0852°N 127.7005°W

Geography
- Country: Canada
- Territory: Northwest Territories
- Parent range: Mackenzie Mountains
- Topo map: NTS 95L4 Mount Sir James MacBrien

Climbing
- First ascent: July 22-23, 1955; Arnold Wexler and party

The Echelon Spires are a series of peaks in the Cirque of the Unclimbables, Northwest Territories, Canada. The peaks are on a ridge 800 meters to the south of the Pentadactyl Spires, their parent, and have a maximum elevation of 2370 meters.

== Climbing history ==
In July 1955, members of the Arnold Wexler climbing party completed first ascents of all four Echelon Spires. In 1985, a team consisting of Syuichi Okada, Toshiyuko Arai, Masahiko Suga, and Kinuyo Hagiwara established a new, 20-pitch route on the South Echelon Spire via its southeast ridge.
