= Mount Savage (Canada) =

Mountain in Canada

Highest point
- Elevation: 2,731 m (8,960 ft)
- Prominence: 581 m (1,906 ft)
- Parent peak: Mount Nirvana
- Coordinates: 61.8563°N 127.5213°W

Geography
- Country: Canada
- Territory: Northwest Territories
- Parent range: Ragged Range
- Topo map: NTS 95E13 Mount Sidney Dobson

Climbing
- First ascent: August, 1960; John Milton

Mount Savage is a peak in the Ragged Range, Northwest Territories, Canada. The peak is 8.6 kilometers to the southeast of Mount Nirvana, its parent, and has an elevation of 2731 meters.

== Climbing history ==
Mount Savage was first climbed in August 1960 by John Milton. It was attempted again in 1965 by Bill Buckingham and Lew Surdam, but the team ultimately decided the peak was too steep and did not complete the ascent.
