= Cathedral Peaks (Canada) =

Mountain in Canada

Highest point
- Elevation: 2,515 m (8,251 ft)
- Prominence: 165 m (541 ft)
- Parent peak: Mount Proboscis
- Coordinates: 62.0915°N 127.6783°W

Geography
- Country: Canada
- Territory: Northwest Territories
- Parent range: Mackenzie Mountains
- Topo map: NTS 95L4 Mount Sir James MacBrien

Climbing
- First ascent: 1952, Dudley Bolyard and party

The Cathedral Peaks are a series of three closely grouped peaks in the Cirque of the Unclimbables, Northwest Territories, Canada. The peaks are on a ridge 2 kilometers to the west of Mount Proboscis, their parent, and have a maximum elevation of 2515 meters.

== Climbing history ==
The three spires of the Cathedral Peaks are denoted as the East, Middle, and West peaks. Each one is considered as constituting a separate climbing objective. The first ascent of any of the peaks was on West Cathedral by Dudley Bolyard and party on the 1952 Yale Logan Expedition, but the details of the route and descent are not well documented. On July 22, 1955 Arnold Wexler and Sterling Hendricks made a first ascent of Middle Cathedral, which was then repeated by the Bill Buckingham party in 1960.
