= Tara Tower =

Mountain in Canada

Highest point
- Elevation: 2,520 m (8,270 ft)
- Prominence: 10 m (33 ft)
- Parent peak: Mount Sir James MacBrien
- Coordinates: 62.1135°N 127.6967°W

Geography
- Country: Canada
- Territory: Northwest Territories
- Parent range: Mackenzie Mountains
- Topo map: NTS 95L4 Mount Sir James MacBrien

Climbing
- First ascent: 1975, David Loeks and Bill Putnam

Tara Tower is a spire in the Cirque of the Unclimbables, Northwest Territories, Canada. The tower is on a ridge 1.4 kilometers to the southwest of Mount Sir James MacBrien, its parent, and has an elevation of 2520 meters. While Tara Tower does not qualify as a distinct summit on account of its low prominence (10 meters), it is a named subpeak and is regarded as a distinct objective by climbers from the nearby Lotus Flower Tower.

== Climbing history ==
Tara Tower was first climbed in 1975 by David Loeks and Bill Putnam via the peak's southeast face. In 1984, climbers Carl Austrom and Michael Down climbed a variation of this route known as the "Southeast Face Right", or the "Eric Weinstein Memorial Route". In 2017, a third route was put up by Pat Goodman, Luke Holloway and David Allfrey which they named "The Source" and consists of 13 pitches of traditional climbing graded at 5.12. Allfrey's team was able to free climb all of the pitches, but ran out of time before being able to make a continuous free ascent.
