= Mount Peacock (Canada) =

Mountain in Canada

Highest point
- Elevation: 2,270 m (7,450 ft)
- Prominence: 60 m (200 ft)
- Parent peak: Kleinspitze
- Coordinates: 62.0928°N 127.7718°W

Geography
- Country: Canada
- Territory: Northwest Territories
- Parent range: Mackenzie Mountains
- Topo map: NTS 95L4 Mount Sir James MacBrien

Climbing
- First ascent: July 11, 1955; Arnold Wexler and party
- Easiest route: North Face

Mount Peacock is a peak in the Cirque of the Unclimbables, Northwest Territories, Canada. The peak is on a ridge 1.8 kilometers to the southwest of Kleinspitze, its parent, and has an elevation of 2270 meters.

== Climbing history ==
On July 11, 1955 Arnold Wexler and Donald Hubbard completed a first ascent of Mount Peacock via its North Face. The team described the route as requiring an approach on a 60 degree ice slope followed by 250 to 300 feet of challenging climbing on fractured, insecure rock. Following this challenging section of climbing, Wexler reported that the angle decreased and required comparatively easy climbing to the summit. The peak has reported few if any confirmed ascents in the years since.
