= Trident Peak (Canada) =

Mountain in Canada

Highest point
- Elevation: 2,430 m (7,970 ft)
- Prominence: 150 m (490 ft)
- Parent peak: Mount Sir James MacBrien
- Coordinates: 62.1235°N 127.6503°W

Geography
- Country: Canada
- Territory: Northwest Territories
- Parent range: Mackenzie Mountains
- Topo map: NTS 95L4 Mount Sir James MacBrien

Climbing
- First ascent: July 7, 1960, Stanley Shepard
- Easiest route: South Ridge

Trident Peak is a peak in the Cirque of the Unclimbables, Northwest Territories, Canada. The peak is on a ridge 2 kilometers to the east of Mount Sir James MacBrien, its parent, and has an elevation of 2430 meters.

== Climbing history ==
On July 7th, 1960, Stanley Shepard completed a first ascent of Trident Peak as part of Bill Buckingham's expedition to the Cirque of the Unclimbables. Buckingham described the peak as "a little metamorphic peak of reddish slate lying on the ridge between Sir James MacBrien and Crescent Peak". Two days later, on July 11th, Buckingham and the rest of the party also climbed the mountain by following Shepard's route.
