= Bustle Tower =

Mountain in Canada

Highest point
- Elevation: 2,310 m (7,580 ft)
- Prominence: 90 m (300 ft)
- Parent peak: Mount Meringue
- Coordinates: 62.1018°N 127.7007°W

Geography
- Country: Canada
- Territory: Northwest Territories
- Parent range: Mackenzie Mountains
- Topo map: NTS 95L4 Mount Sir James MacBrien

Climbing
- First ascent: July 27, 1973 by Galen Rowell and party
- Easiest route: West Ridge

Bustle Tower is a peak in the Cirque of the Unclimbables, Northwest Territories, Canada. The peak is on a ridge 3 kilometers to the southeast of Mount Meringue, its parent, and has an elevation of 2310 meters.

== Climbing history ==
In July of 1973, climbers Galen Rowell, Harthon Bill, and Joe Bridges completed a first ascent of Bustle Tower via its western ridge. Rowell described the peak as a "steep, pointed tower directly behind Terrace Tower" and they had previously identified the west ridge as a viable route with "ledges and plenty of cracks" to facilitate the ascent. The team ascended the majority of the peak over a period of two days using a mixture of free and aid climbing, followed by a traversal of a knife edge ridge to a false summit, then ultimately a final climb to the true summit of the tower.

Several years after the first ascent, climbers Jaques Collar, Jacques Ramouillet, and Renzo Lorenzi completed a second ascent of the peak in July of 1977 via the southeast face. That same year, a team led by Erich Lackner ascended the peak for the first time by the southeast dihedral route.
