= Mount Contact =

Mountain in Canada

Highest point
- Elevation: 2,556 m (8,386 ft)
- Prominence: 96 m (315 ft)
- Parent peak: Mount Proboscis
- Coordinates: 62.0917°N 127.7260°W

Geography
- Country: Canada
- Territory: Northwest Territories
- Parent range: Mackenzie Mountains
- Topo map: NTS 95L4 Mount Sir James MacBrien

Climbing
- First ascent: July 23, 1960, William J. Buckingham and party

Mount Contact is a peak in the Cirque of the Unclimbables, Northwest Territories, Canada. The peak is located on a ridge one kilometer to the southwest of Mount Proboscis, its parent, and has an elevation of 2556 meters.

== Climbing History ==
On July 23rd, 1960, members of the Bill Buckingham party completed a first ascent of Mount Contact as part of their expedition to the Cirque of the Unclimbables. The group summited this mountain twice, first on July 23rd and again on July 29th, with both attempts completed as part of a larger push to attempt to summit the neighboring Mount Proboscis.
