= Mount Polymer =

Mountain in Canada

Highest point
- Elevation: 2,660 m (8,730 ft)
- Prominence: 350 m (1,150 ft)
- Parent peak: Mount Sir James MacBrien
- Coordinates: 62.1108°N 127.7345°W

Geography
- Country: Canada
- Territory: Northwest Territories
- Parent range: Mackenzie Mountains
- Topo map: NTS 95L4 Mount Sir James MacBrien

Climbing
- First ascent: July 9, 1955; Arnold Wexler and party
- Easiest route: East Arete

Mount Polymer is a peak in the Cirque of the Unclimbables, Northwest Territories, Canada. The peak is on a ridge 3.2 kilometers to the southwest of Mount Sir James MacBrien, its parent, and has an elevation of 2660 meters.

== Climbing history ==
On July 9, 1955 the Arnold Wexler party completed a first ascent of Mount Polymer over a period of 17 hours via the peak's eastern arete. The team approached the arete by ascending a snow gulley which terminiated in a col partway up the peak, following which they ascended 1000 feet of secure, slabby rock to the summit. Following this first ascent, few if any additional ascents have been recorded.
