= Mount Meringue =

Mountain in Canada

Highest point
- Elevation: 2,590 m (8,500 ft)
- Prominence: 140 m (460 ft)
- Parent peak: Mount Proboscis
- Coordinates: 62.1055°N 127.7212°W

Geography
- Country: Canada
- Territory: Northwest Territories
- Parent range: Mackenzie Mountains
- Topo map: NTS 95L4 Mount Sir James MacBrien

Climbing
- First ascent: July 12, 1960, William J. Buckingham and party

Mount Meringue is a peak in the Cirque of the Unclimbables, Northwest Territories, Canada. The peak is on a ridge one kilometre to the north of Mount Proboscis and has an elevation of 2590 meters.

== Climbing History ==
On July 12th, 1960 members of the Bill Buckingham party completed a first ascent of Mount Meringue as part of their expedition to the Cirque of the Unclimbables. The group ascended via the mountain's southeasterly ridge which separates it from neighboring Bustle Tower. Buckingham described the ridge as gradually steepening and leading into a ledge that allowed the group to traverse left onto the eastern face of the peak. Following this traversal, the group was able to ascend a series of chimneys to the upper snowfields of the peak whereby they were able to navigate the snowfield and several small ice chimmneys to the summit. From the summit of Mount Meringue, the team was able to observe the summit and an apparent route to the summit of the nearby Parrot Beak Peak, which the group would ultimately complete a first ascent of two days later.
