= Mount Harrison Smith =

Mountain in Canada

Highest point
- Elevation: 2,510 m (8,230 ft)
- Prominence: 160 m (520 ft)
- Parent peak: Cathedral Peaks
- Coordinates: 62.0936°N 127.6681°W

Geography
- Country: Canada
- Territory: Northwest Territories
- Parent range: Mackenzie Mountains
- Topo map: NTS 95L4 Mount Sir James MacBrien

Climbing
- First ascent: July 21, 1955; Arnold Wexler and party

Mount Harrison Smith is a peak in the Cirque of the Unclimbables, Northwest Territories, Canada. The peak is on a ridge 600 meters to the northeast of the Cathedral Peaks, its parent, and has an elevation of 2510 meters. It was named in 1944 after Canadian industrialist G. Harrison Smith.

== Climbing history ==
Mount Harrison Smith was first climbed by Arnold Wexler and Sterling Hendricks on July 21, 1955 via the South Face, ascending 5000 feet of granite wall subdivided by numerous ledges along the route. The rest of the party consisting of Donald Hubbard, Dave Bernays, and Ray D'Arcy also summited the peak via the same route the following day. The peak wasn't climbed again until 1960, when members of the Bill Buckingham party established a new route on the North Face. In the years following these first two expeditions, the peak has seen many subsequent ascents and the establishment of at least seven more routes on its north, south, east, and northeast faces. Among these are the named routes Fitzcarraldo on the north pillar and Notte Chiara on the north face.
