= Terrace Tower =

Mountain in Canada

Highest point
- Elevation: 2,070 m (6,790 ft)
- Prominence: 5 m (16 ft)
- Parent peak: Mount Sir James MacBrien
- Coordinates: 62.1032°N 127.6922°W

Geography
- Country: Canada
- Territory: Northwest Territories
- Parent range: Mackenzie Mountains
- Topo map: NTS 95L4 Mount Sir James MacBrien

Climbing
- First ascent: July 5, 1960; Bill Buckingham and party
- Easiest route: North Face

Terrace Tower is a spire in the Cirque of the Unclimbables, Northwest Territories, Canada. The tower is on a ridge 1.5 kilometers to the southwest of Mount Sir James MacBrien, its parent, and has an elevation of 2070 meters. While Terrace Tower does not qualify as a distinct summit on account of its low prominence (5 meters), it is a named subpeak that is regarded as a distinct objective by climbers from the nearby Bustle Tower.

== Climbing history ==
On July 5, 1960, Bill Buckingham, Mason Hoadley, and Stuart Krebs completed a first ascent of Terrace Tower via its northern face. They described the peak as a "sharp little spire...separating the First and Second Cirques" that required approaching via steep snow slopes and insecure shelves to gain the plateau east of the tower, but made few remarks on the final climb to the summit.

In the years following the Buckingham party's first ascent, many other routes have been put up on the tower including up the eastern buttress and the northeastern corner. Several named routes have also been established, including The White Tower, Light in August, and Brent's Hammer, generally requiring a mix of traditional and aid climbing to reach the summit.
