= Parrot Beak Peak =

Mountain in Canada

Highest point
- Elevation: 2,610 m (8,560 ft)
- Prominence: 180 m (590 ft)
- Parent peak: Mount Sir James MacBrien
- Coordinates: 62.1193°N 127.6968°W

Geography
- Country: Canada
- Territory: Northwest Territories
- Parent range: Mackenzie Mountains
- Topo map: NTS 95L4 Mount Sir James MacBrien

Climbing
- First ascent: July 16, 1960, William J. Buckingham and party

Parrot Beak Peak is a peak in the Cirque of the Unclimbables, Northwest Territories, Canada. The peak is on a ridge one kilometre to the southwest of Mount Sir James MacBrien and has an elevation of 2610 meters.

== Climbing History ==
On July 12th, 1960 members of the Bill Buckingham party completed a first ascent of Mount Meringue as part of their expedition to the Cirque of the Unclimbables. From the summit, they were able to observe the western slope of nearby Parrot Beak Peak and discern a difficult to approach, but relatively easy route to the summit. After taking a rest day, the party made and attempt for the summit but were turned around at the bottom of the western face by heavy rains. Following another day of heavy rains, the team was able to reattempt the route on July 16th and ascend to the summit via a "mossy, chockstone-filled couloir" and a series of narrow traversing shelves on the western face of the mountain, thus marking the first ascent of the peak.
