= Crescent Peak =

Mountain in Canada

Highest point
- Elevation: 2,484 m (8,150 ft)
- Prominence: 254 m (833 ft)
- Parent peak: Mount Sir James MacBrien
- Coordinates: 62.1097°N 127.6385°W

Geography
- Country: Canada
- Territory: Northwest Territories
- Parent range: Mackenzie Mountains
- Topo map: NTS 95L4 Mount Sir James MacBrien

Climbing
- First ascent: July 7, 1960, William J. Buckingham and party

Crescent Peak is a peak in the Cirque of the Unclimbables, Northwest Territories, Canada. The peak is on a ridge 3 kilometers to the southeast of Mount Sir James MacBrien, its parent, and has an elevation of 2484 meters.

== Climbing history ==
On July 7th, 1960, members of the Bill Buckingham party completed a first ascent of Crescent Peak as part of their expedition to the Cirque of the Unclimbables. The team ascended a southwest-facing couloir, then proceeded with a section of difficult rock climbing before ascending a large snow field on the mountain's western face. Buckingham reported that the team spent little time on the summit and described the descent as being "uneventful".
