= Museum of Old Herzegovina =

Museum in Foča, Republika Srpska, Bosnia and Herzegovina

Coordinates: 43°30′22.7″N 18°46′31.3″E

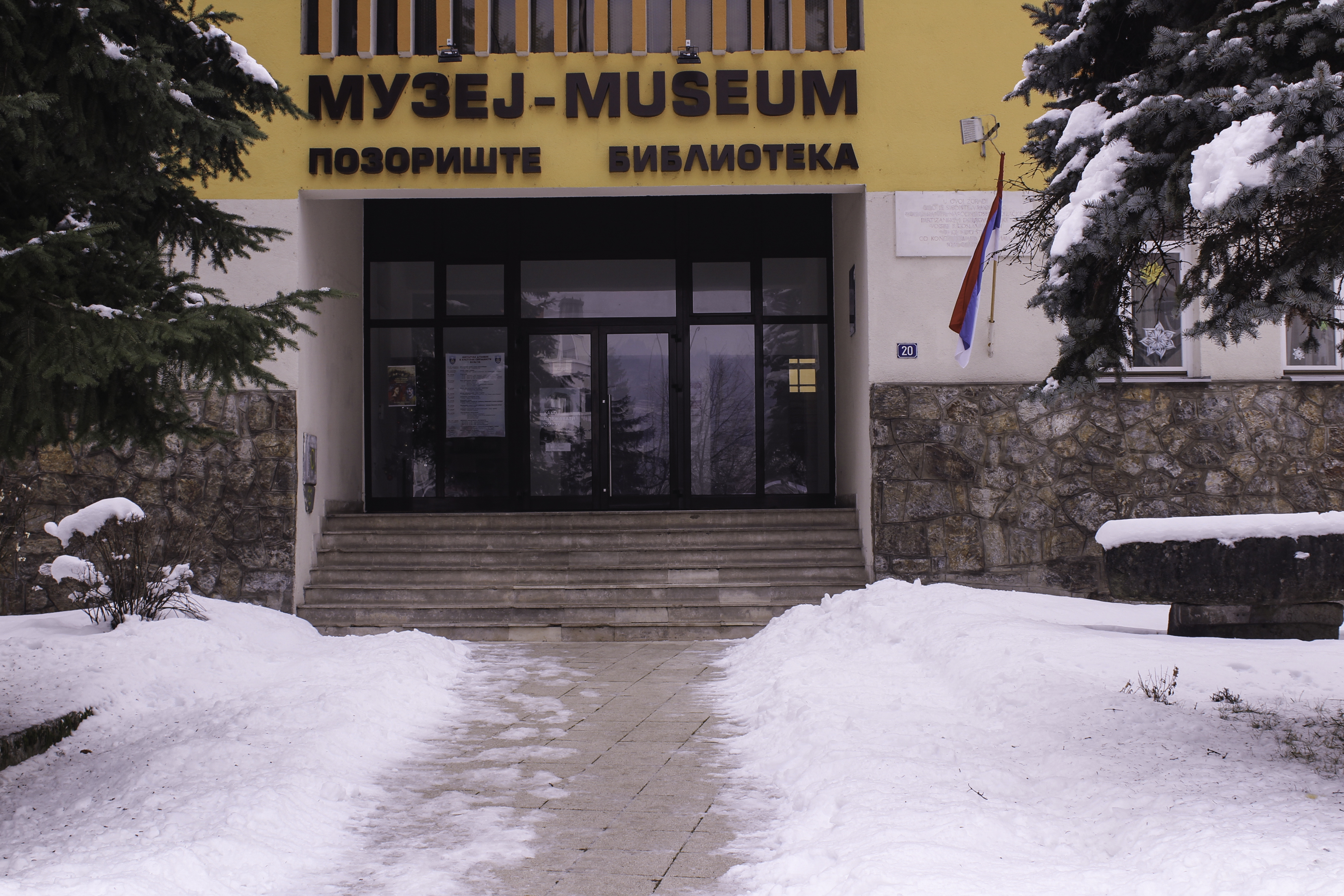
- Established: 1956
- Location: Trg Kralja Petra I
- Website: muzejfoca.com

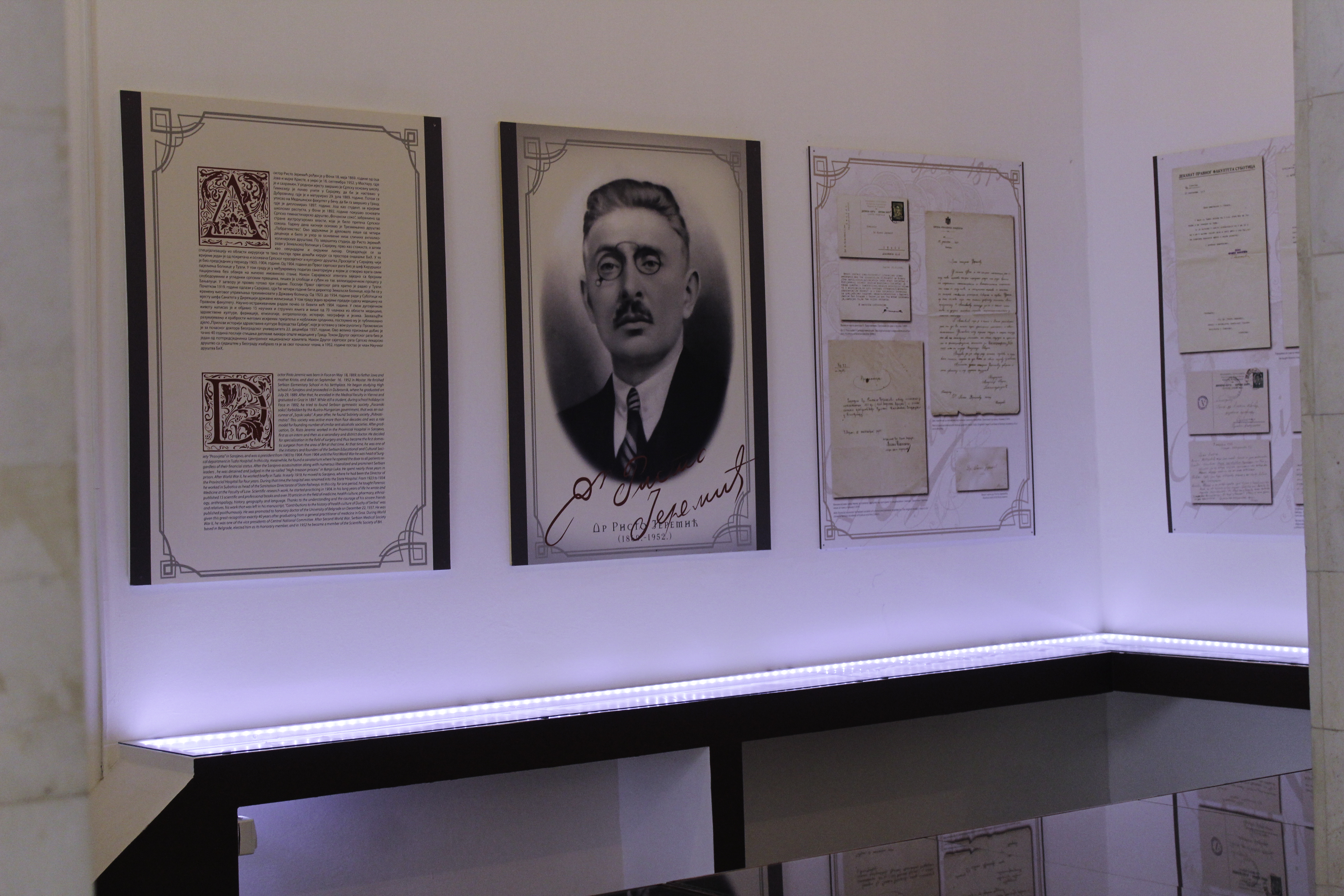
Part item Dr. Risto Jeremić at the Museum of Old Herzegovina.

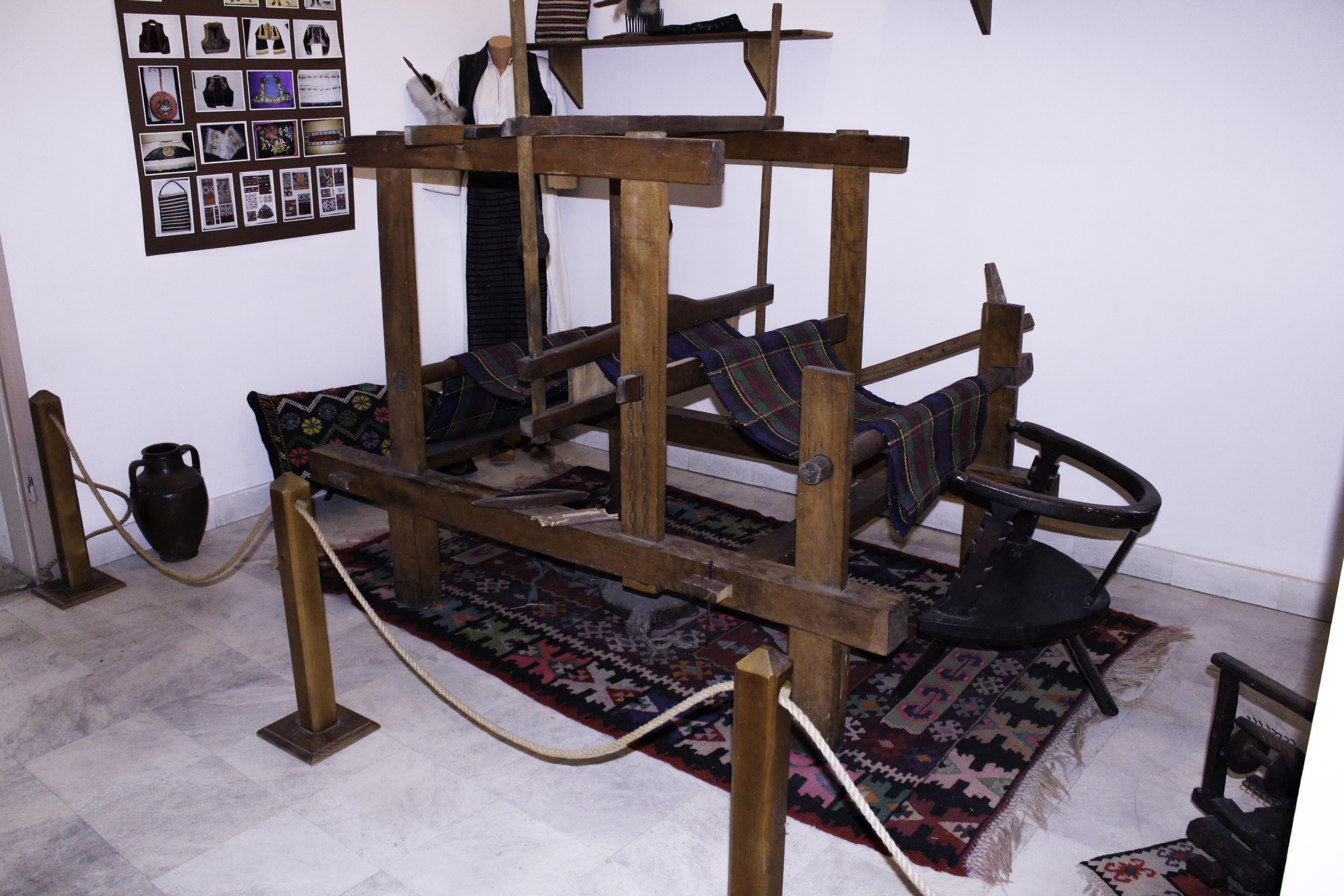
Loom – part of ethnographic items in the Museum of Old Herzegovina in Foča.

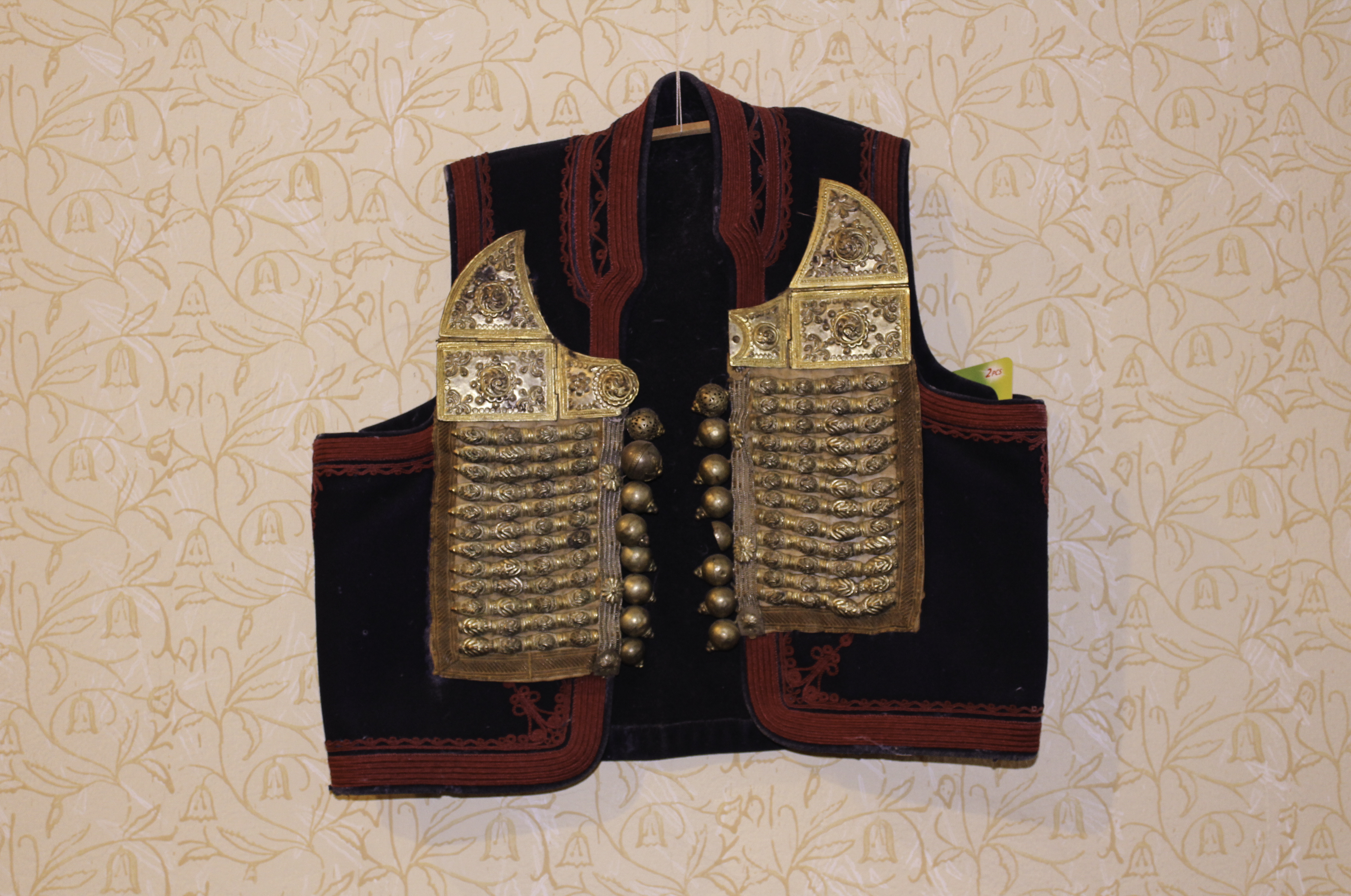
Men folk costume.

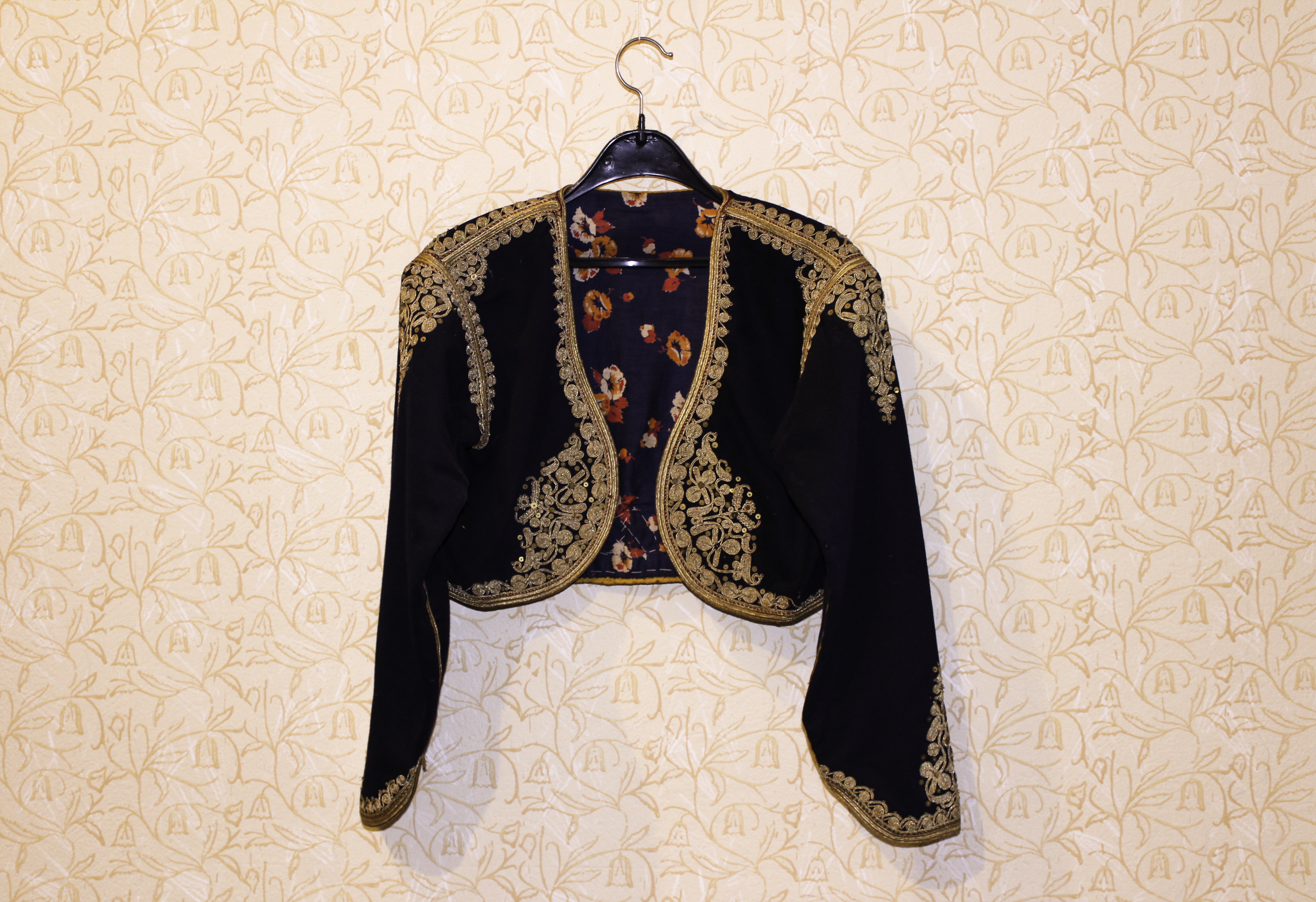
Libada – part of female folk costumes.

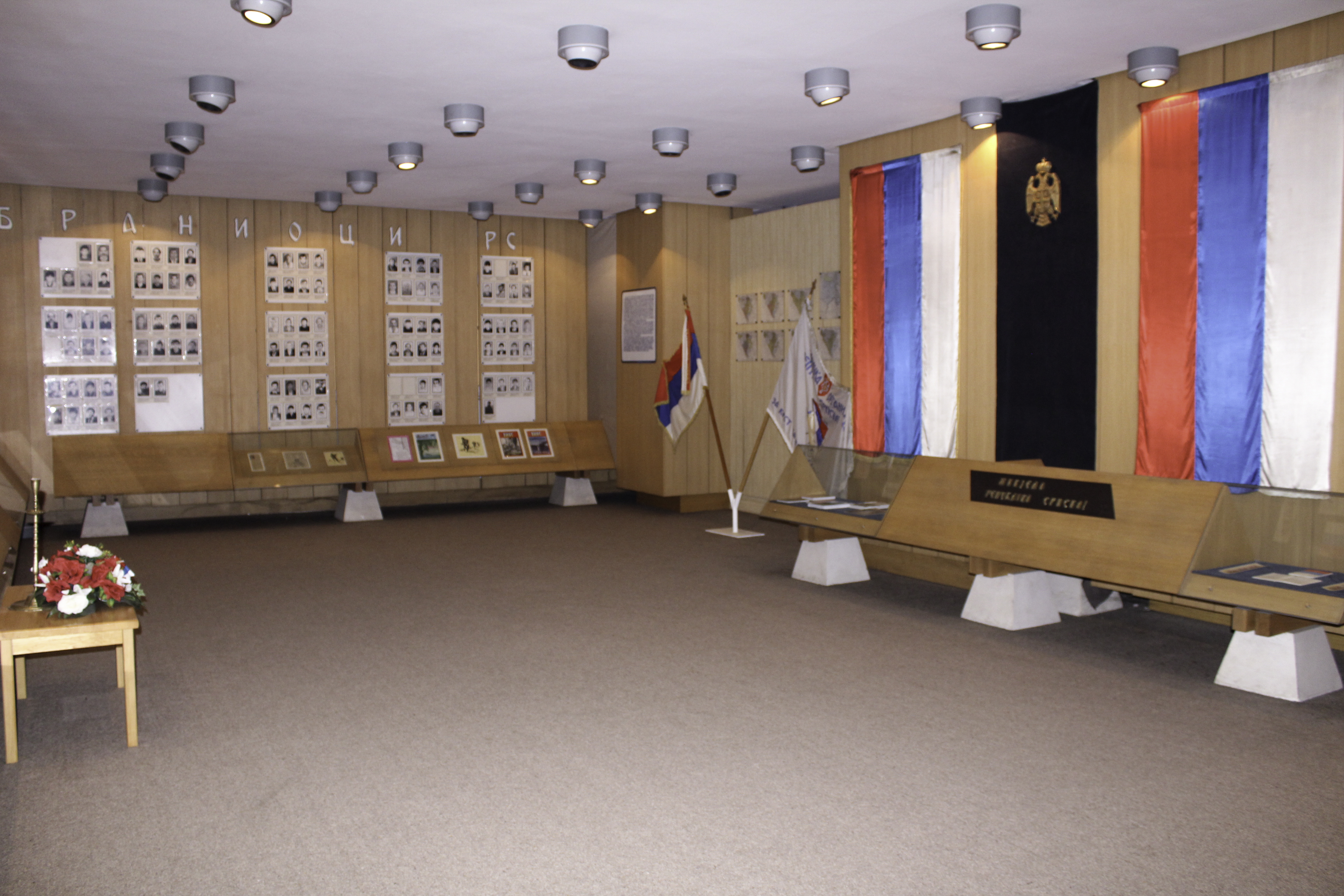
Memorial Room – detail.

The Museum of Old Herzegovina is a museum in Foča, Republika Srpska, Bosnia and Herzegovina.

== History ==
The museum was founded in 1956. It is located in a building of the former Hotel "Gerstl" which was built in 1906, and torn down during the World War II. At the same place Hotel "Vucevo" was built again, and later adapted for museological activity. The museum has a rich collection and four permanent exhibitions.

== Museum exhibitions ==
The museum has a rich museum fund and has five permanent exhibitions. In the gallery of the museum exhibit is traveling exhibitions on various topics.

=== Foča in the past ===
Exhibit "Foča in the past" provides visitors to get to know the rich past of Foča municipality. Chronologically it covers the period from prehistoric times to the middle of XX century. Exhibition includes numerous items and photos which evoke different periods and prominent figures from Foča's past. Especially attractive exhibits for visitors are those from Ancient period such are weapon remains, tools and pottery as well as medieval spears, swords and maces, and from Ottoman period handcraft made and decorated weapons. Within this, exhibits numismatic collection can also be seen (old money, mandals, which includes different currencies that have been used in Foča's area.)

=== Ethnographic exhibition ===
Ethnographic exhibition includes furniture, furnishings and folk costumes fragments, created during past times, which are not in use, and reflect the lifestyle of the population of Foča's area. Exhibit items evoke the interior of the rural and urban houses from the beginning of the XX century, and authentic and decorated handicraft products can be seen.

=== Foča period of People's Liberation struggle ===
Exhibit "Foča period of People's Liberation struggle" presents Foča during World War II. The Central Committee of Communist Party of Yugoslavia and the Supreme command headed by Tito were in Foča in that period. Organisation of the military, political and background structure of People's Liberation struggle of Yugoslavia had done in this period. At the same time the frozen Partisans who were participants of Igman march had been accepted and helped. During that time Moša Pijade has written "Foča regulations" which becomes basis of future Socialist Yugoslavia.

=== Dr. Risto Jeremić ===
Dr. Risto Jeremić one of the initiators and founder of the Serbian Cultural and Educational Society "Prosvjeta", and then the president of its Main Board. He graduated from the Faculty of Medicine in Graz, and he was the first man from Foča who had a high professional education, and then the first domestic surgeon in the former Bosnia and Herzegovina. He is the author of fifteen books and more than seventy scientific and professional papers from various fields. He was director of the State Hospital in Sarajevo, honorary doctor of the Belgrade University and academician.

=== Foča in the Defense and Homeland War ===
The exhibition through photographs, documents and objects presents the events that took place in the area of Foča during the 1992 – 1995 Civil War in Bosnia and Herzegovina. It shows the situation in the Former Yugoslavia in the last years of its existence, and the largest part of the exhibition presents the war effort of the fighters of Foča, their formation shaping in the 11th Infantry Brigade of Herzegovina and its assignment to the final Conclusion of peace.

== See also ==
- List of museums in Bosnia and Herzegovina
- Museum of Modern Art of Republika Srpska
- Old Herzegovina
