= Herzegovina Museum =

Museum in Mostar, Bosnia and Herzegovina

Museum of Herzegovina
- Muzej Hercegovine
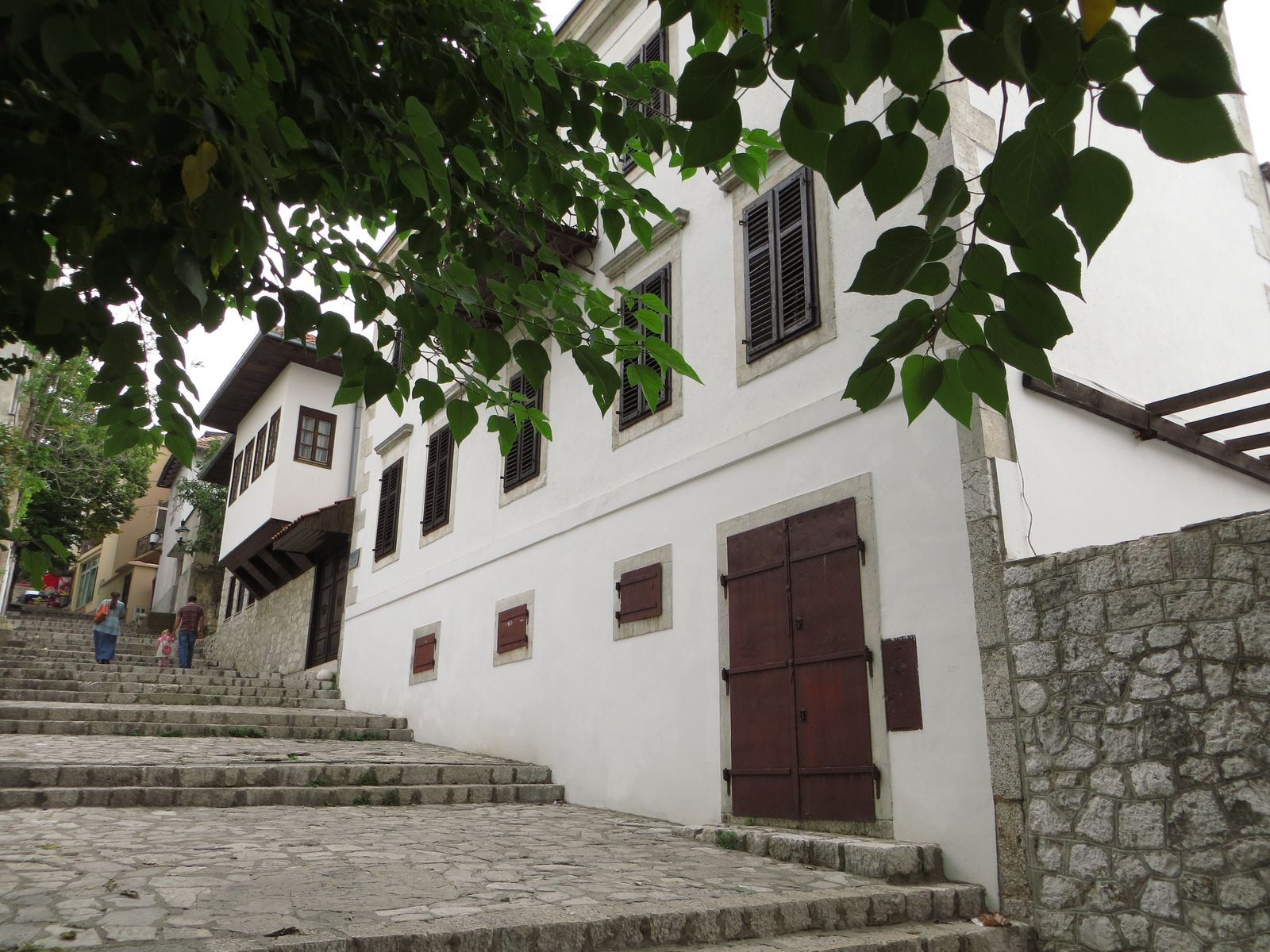

- Location within Bosnia and Herzegovina
- Established: 1950
- Location: Bajatova 4, Mostar, Bosnia and Herzegovina
- Coordinates: 43°20′20.5″N 17°48′58″E
- Type: Museum
- Website: www.muzejhercegovine.com/web/

The Herzegovina Museum (Bosnian: Muzej Hercegovine) is a museum in Mostar, Bosnia and Herzegovina containing items associated with the history of the area.

== History ==
The museum was established in 1950 with the purpose to find, collect, keep and present the cultural and historical heritage of Mostar and Herzegovina. They divided their work into four main goals, namely archaeology, literature, history and ethnology.

The museum is divided into four main sections, to meet each of the above goals, with the sites located across the city:

- Džemal Bijedić Memorial House (History)
- Memorial House of Svetozar Ćorović (Literature)
- Tara Tower Museum of the Old Bridge (Archaeology)
- MuM Interpretation Center Mostar (Ethnology)

The Herzegovina Museum owns a collection of archaeological and ethnographic exhibits, as well as documents supplying information on the various periods of the city of Mostar and Herzegovina. It also features antique furniture and historical objects of daily use.

The section of the museum housed in the former home of Džemal Bijedić, the head of the Yugoslav Government who died in a plane crash in 1977 is dedicated to his life. This section of the museum was opened on 22 April 1981, displaying a political biography of Bijedić.

The house of writer Svetozar Ćorović was acquired and opened as a second museum in 1968. An exhibition on the life of poet Aleksa Šantić is held here.

The Museum of the Old Bridge, opened in 2004, tells the history of the stone bridge built in 1557. Both the Old Bridge and the city of Mostar were made UNESCO World Heritage Sites in 2005.

The MuM Interpretation Centre is an ethnological museum which tells the story of Mostar's religion, culture and spiritual background.

== See also ==
- List of museums in Bosnia and Herzegovina
