= Ragged Range =

Mountain range in northwestern Canada

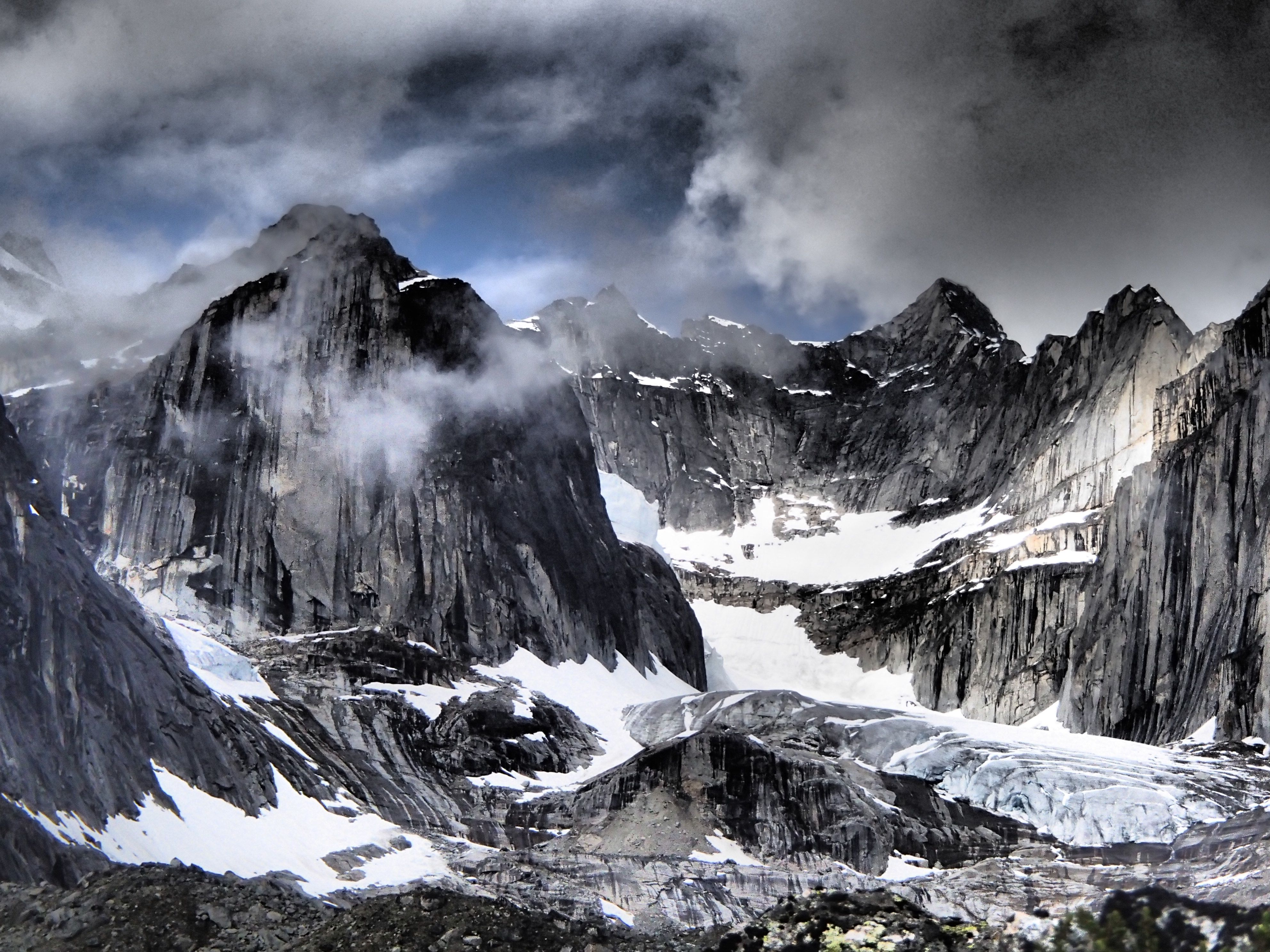
- Mount Nirvana, the tallest peak in the Ragged Range

Highest point
- Peak: Mount Nirvana
- Elevation: 2,773 m (9,098 ft)
- Coordinates: 61.9708°N 127.6488°W

Geography
- Location within Canada Location within Northwest Territories
- Country: Canada
- Territories: Northwest Territories
- Parent range: Logan Mountains

The Ragged Range is mountain range in Northwest Territories, Canada. It is a subrange of the Logan Mountains, which are in turn a subrange of the Mackenzie Mountains.

== Etymology ==
The Ragged Range is named for its ragged granite peaks.

== Geography ==
The Ragged Range lies at the far western edge of Canada's Northwest Territories on the border with the Yukon Territory, largely within the borders of the Nahanni National Park Reserve. The range contains numerous named peaks - such as Mount Sidney Dobson, Mount Sir James MacBrien, Ragged Peak, and Mount Nirvana - many of which rank among the tallest in the Northwest Territories.

There are several well-known sub-areas within the Ragged Range, most notably the Cirque of the Unclimbables, which is composed of three cirques and rimmed by approximately two dozen named peaks and is a popular destination for rock climbers and alpinists.

The range also includes numerous glaciers. As of 2017, there are a total of 345 individual glaciers in the Ragged Range that cover a total area of nearly 205 square kilometers, which represents a decrease in area of 34 square kilometers over a decade. However, the number of glaciers in the range has been increasing as a result of the fragmentation of larger glaciers into multiple smaller glaciers.

== Gallery ==
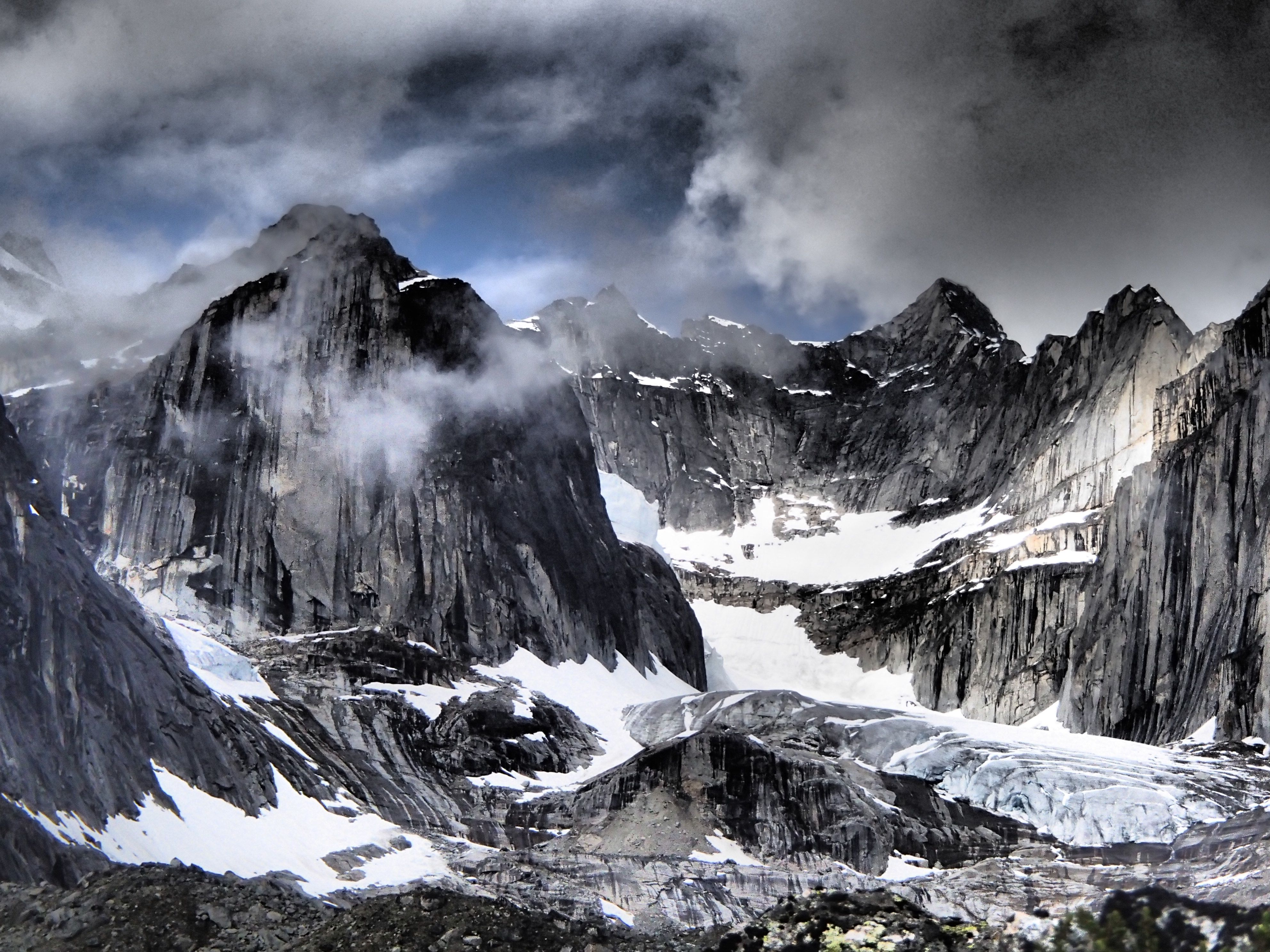
East face of Mount Nirvana

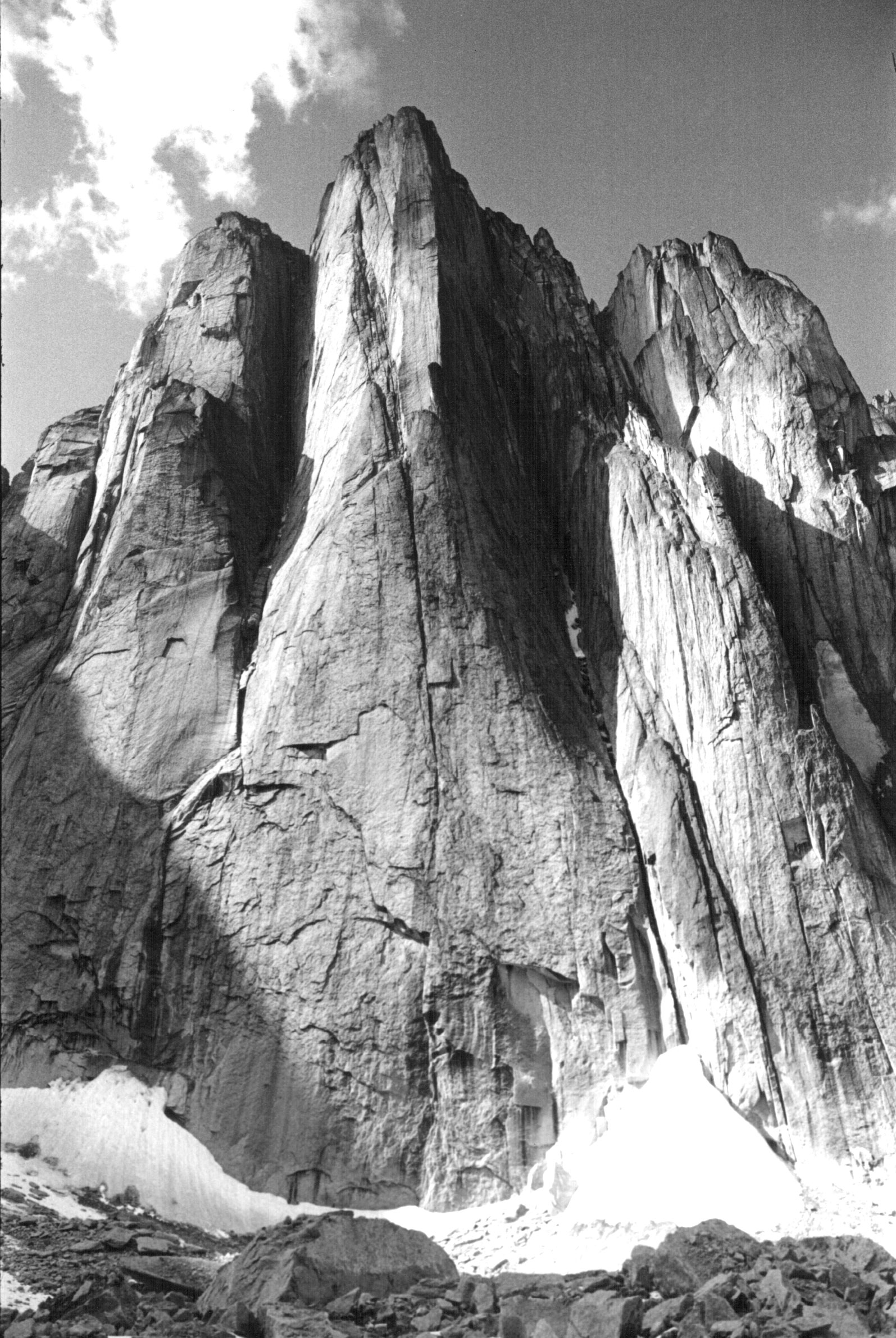
Lotus Flower Tower, a popular climbing objective in the Ragged Range

Mount Harrison Smith

Inside the Nahanni National Park Reserve
