= Mount Proboscis =

Mountain in Canada

Highest point
- Elevation: 2,610 m (8,560 ft)
- Prominence: 220 m (720 ft)
- Parent peak: Mount Polymer
- Coordinates: 62.0966°N 127.7191°W

Geography
- Country: Canada
- Territory: Northwest Territories
- Parent range: Mackenzie Mountains
- Topo map: NTS 95L4 Mount Sir James MacBrien

Climbing
- First ascent: July 29, 1960, William J. Buckingham and party

Mount Proboscis is a peak in the Cirque of the Unclimbables, Northwest Territories, Canada. The peak is on a ridge 1.8 kilometers to the southeast of Mount Polymer, its parent peak, and has an elevation of 2610 meters.

== Climbing History ==
On July 29th, 1960, members of the Bill Buckingham party completed a first ascent of Mount Proboscis as part of their expedition to the Cirque of the Unclimbables. The group approached the mountain via a tongue of the glacier in the First Cirque and ascended a steep snow and ice chute to the col, known as "What Notch", dividing Proboscis on the west from the Pentadactyl Spires on the east. In order to climb the peak, the team first had to climb Mount Contact, a smaller peak which lay along the ridge between the point of approach and Mount Proboscis. Once on Proboscis, the bulk of the climb consisted of technical slab rock climbing followed by a traversal of the peak's heavily corniced summit ridge. Once on the summit, the team built a small cairn and conducted a series of rappels to the ground. Buckingham considered the climb to be "the high point of the expedition...certainly rank[ing] among the most difficult rock peaks of North America".
