= Pentadactyl Spires =

Mountain in Canada

Highest point
- Elevation: 2,450 m (8,040 ft)
- Prominence: 100 m (330 ft)
- Parent peak: Cathedral Peaks
- Coordinates: 62.0922°N 127.7008°W

Geography
- Country: Canada
- Territory: Northwest Territories
- Parent range: Mackenzie Mountains
- Topo map: NTS 95L4 Mount Sir James MacBrien

Climbing
- First ascent: July 22-23, 1955; Arnold Wexler and party

The Pentadactyl Spires are a series of four rock spires in the Cirque of the Unclimbables, Northwest Territories, Canada. The formation is on a ridge 1 kilometer to the west of the Cathedral Peaks, their parent, and have a maximum elevation of 2450 meters.

== Climbing history ==
The first three spires were climbed by members of the Arnold Wexler expedition over the course of two days as part of their expedition to the Cirque of the Unclimbables in 1955. The fourth and final spire remained unclimbed for the next twenty years until it was ascended by Bill Putnam and Doug Burbank in the summer of 1975.
