= Museum of the Old Bridge =

Museum in Mostar

Coordinates: 43.337356°N 17.815503°E

The Museum of the Old Bridge is a museum located in the Old Town Area of Mostar, Bosnia and Herzegovina. The museum opened in 2006 to celebrate the second anniversary of the reconstruction of the Stari Most (transl. Old Bridge). The museum's premises are within the Tara Tower and they consist of three distinct sections.

The first section, consisting of the Tara Tower itself, contains archaeological objects discovered during the 2002 reconstruction carried. Exhibits are accompanied by the informative charts explaining the principal historical events associated with the Old Bridge. Out the five floors of this section, the top one contains a gazebo with a panoramic view of Mostar. The second section contains pre-existing archaeological remains discovered underneath the tower. This includes the remains of two wooden bridges belonging to the period prior to the construction of stone bridge and the base of the Old Bridge. And finally, the third section called "Labyrinth" contains a photographic gallery dedicated to the Old Bridge; that is, to the damaged towers and to the phases of restoration. Audiovisual materials and multimedia charts recount the history of the bridge's construction.

== See also ==
- List of museums in Bosnia and Herzegovina
