= Sarajevo Brewery Museum =

Coordinates: 43.8563°N 18.4324°E

- Muzej Sarajevske pivare (Bosnian)
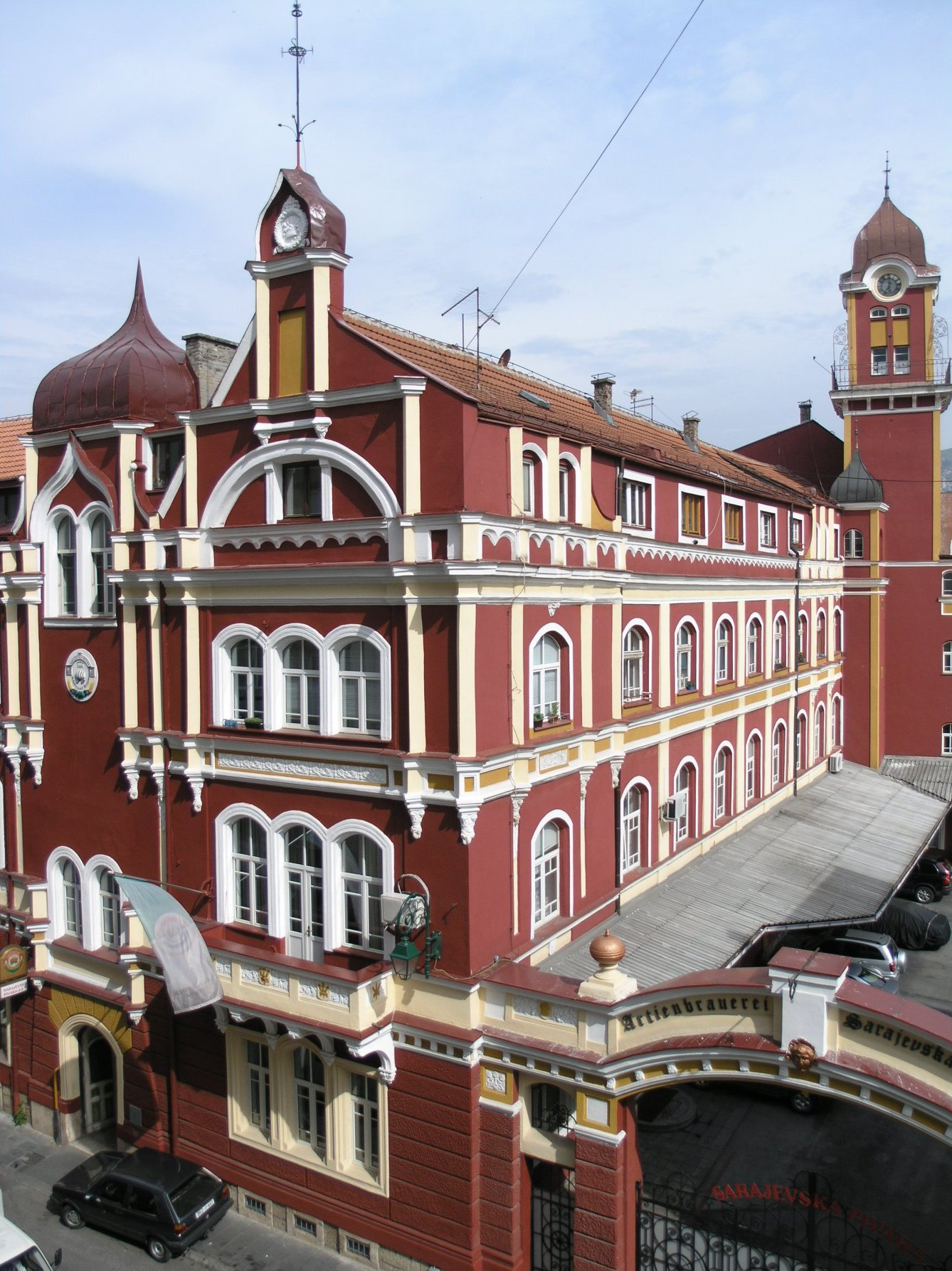
- Established: 2004
- Location: Franjevačka 15, Sarajevo, Bosnia and Herzegovina
- Type: Brewery museum
- Website: sarajevska-pivara.com/muzej

The Sarajevo Brewery Museum (Bosnian: Muzej Sarajevske pivare; Serbo-Croatian Cyrillic: Музеј Сарајевске пиваре) is a museum that showcases the history of brewing in Sarajevo and Bosnia and Herzegovina. It was established in 2004.

== History ==
The Sarajevo Brewery was founded on May 24, 1864, by Josef Feldbauer in the Kovačići settlement. It is the first industrial brewery in Bosnia and Herzegovina and has operated continuously since its establishment. In 1881, Viennese industrialist Heinrich Lewy opened a new brewery in the Bistrik neighborhood, which later became part of the unified Sarajevo Brewery company in 1893.

The brewery has survived and maintained production through both World Wars as well as the siege of Sarajevo.

== Museum ==
The museum's exhibits cover various historical periods: the Ottoman Empire, the Austro-Hungarian monarchy, the World Wars, Socialist Yugoslavia, and the post-war period. Artifacts such as vintage brewing equipment and old beer bottles are also present in the museum.

=== Visitor information ===
The museum is open to visitors from Monday to Saturday, between 11:00 AM and 5:30 PM. The entrance fee is 5 BAM (approximately 2.50 EUR).

== See also ==
- Sarajevska pivara
- Beer in Bosnia and Herzegovina
- List of museums in Bosnia and Herzegovina
