= Lotus Flower Tower =

Mountain in Canada

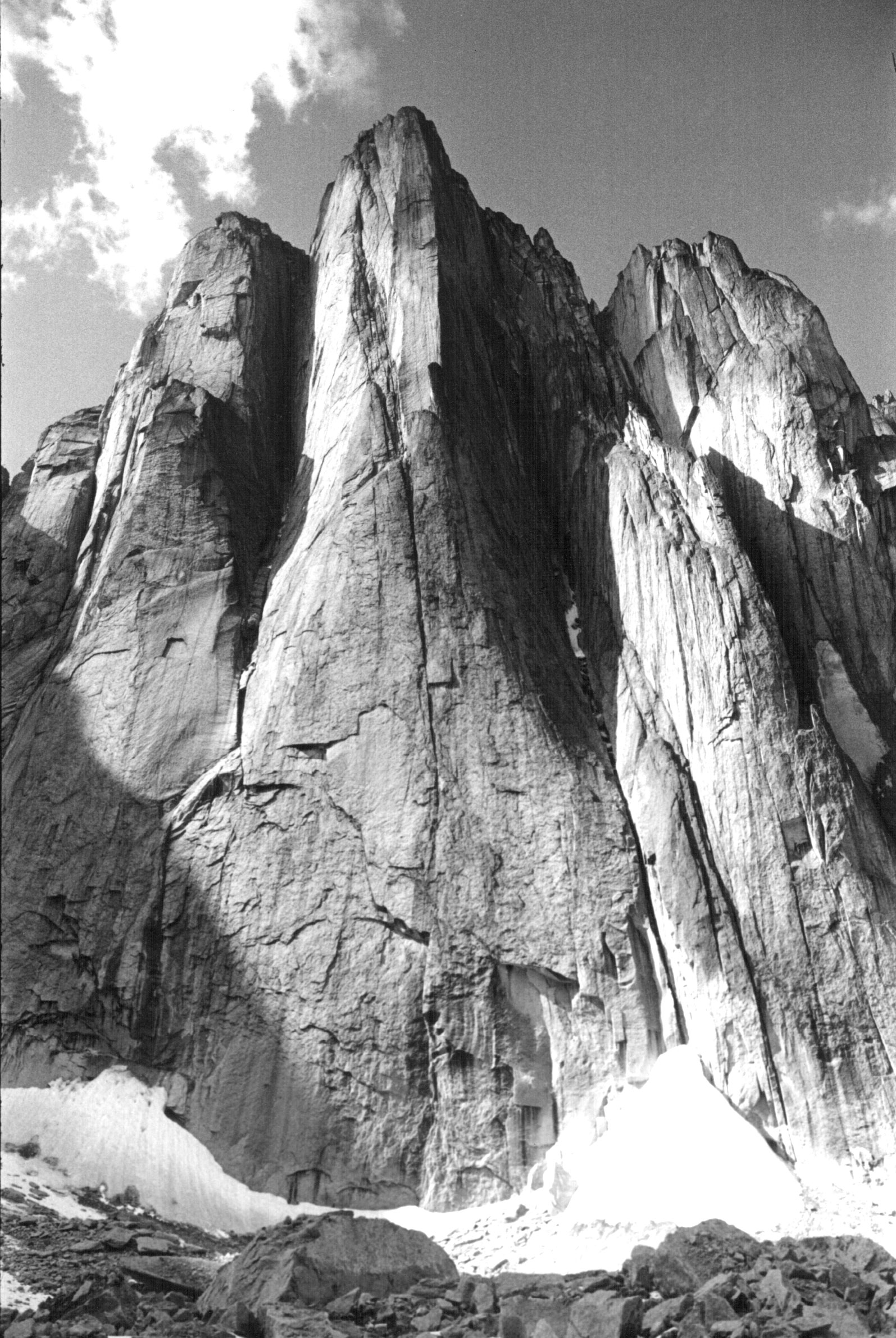
- Lotus Flower Tower by Tom Frost, 1968

Highest point
- Elevation: 2,570 m (8,430 ft)
- Prominence: 160 m (520 ft)
- Parent peak: Mount Sir James MacBrien
- Coordinates: 62°06′51.6″N 127°41′50.4″W

Geography
- Country: Canada
- Territory: Northwest Territories
- Parent range: Mackenzie Mountains
- Topo map: NTS 95L4 Mount Sir James MacBrien

Climbing
- First ascent: July 16, 1960, William J. Buckingham and party

Lotus Flower Tower is a peak in the Cirque of the Unclimbables, Northwest Territories, Canada. The tower is on a ridge one kilometre to the southwest of Mount Sir James MacBrien, and though the tower is not prominent in relation to surrounding peaks, it is noted for its sheer rock walls which are home to classic multi-pitch climbing routes.

== Climbing history ==
The first ascent was made by William J. Buckingham and party on July 16, 1960, via a traverse from "Tathagata Tower" along the ridge which connects Lotus Flower Tower to Mount Sir James MacBrien. The peak's second ascent and first ascent of the sheer 2200 foot southeast face was made in 1968 by Harthon "Sandy" Bill, Tom Frost, and James McCarthy.

The first free ascent of the McCarthy-Frost-Bill route was completed by Steven Levin, Mark Robinson and Sandy Stewart in 1977.

The striking route was recognized as one of the Fifty Classic Climbs of North America and has been called "one of the most aesthetically beautiful rock faces in the world".
