= Museum of the National Struggle for Liberation =

Museum of the National Struggle for Liberation Museum of the 2nd AVNOJ session
- Muzej AVNOJ-a; Muzej 2. zasjedanja AVNOJ-a
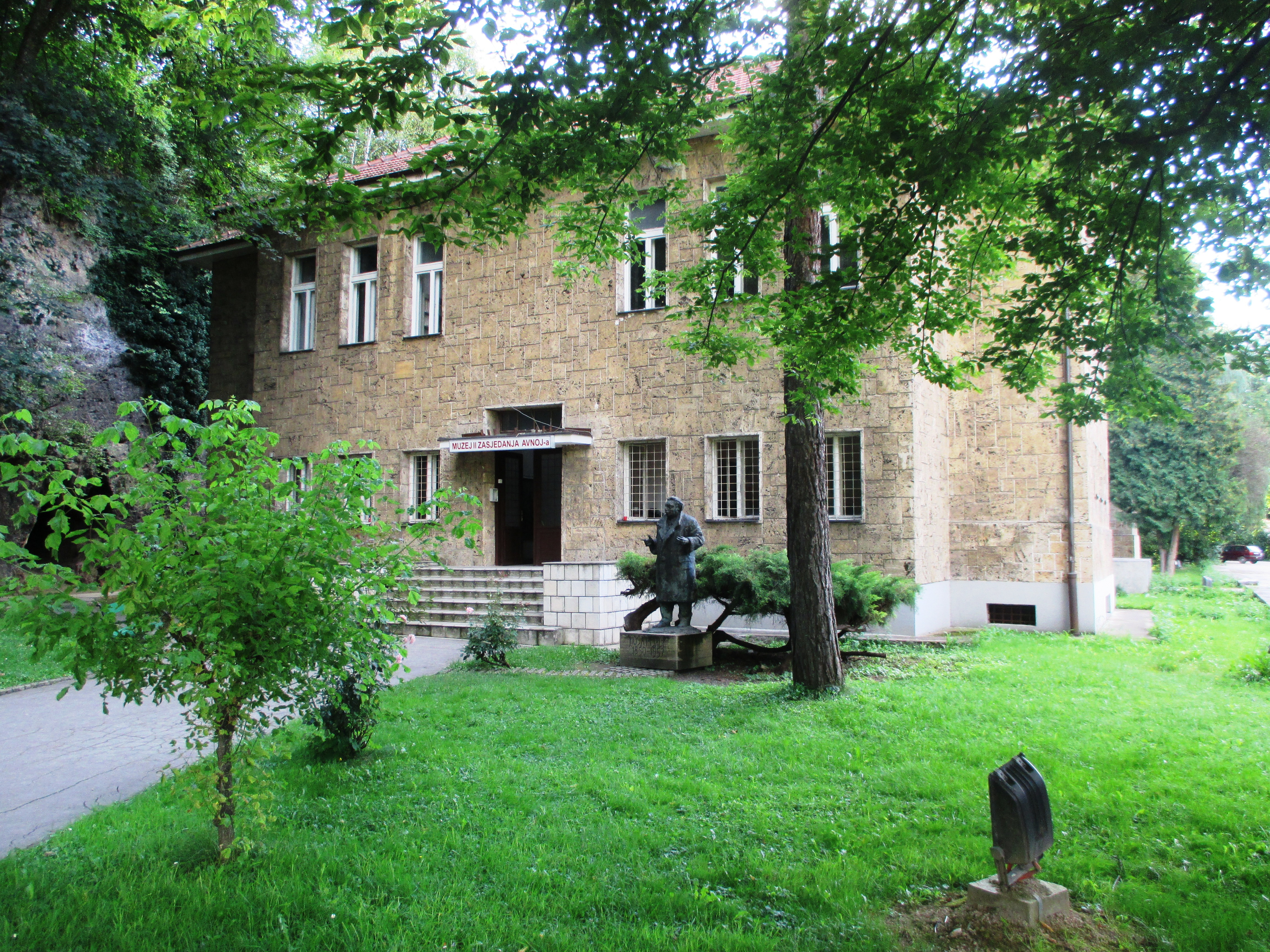
- AVNOJ museum in Jajce.
- Established: 1971
- Location: II zasjedanja AVNOJ-a, Stari grad, Jajce, Jajce Municipality, Central Bosnia Canton, Federation of Bosnia and Herzegovina, 70101, Bosnia and Herzegovina
- Coordinates: 44°20′17″N 17°16′05″E
- Type: Museum

The Museum of the National Struggle for Liberation is a history museum located in the town of Jajce, in the Central Bosnia Canton of Bosnia and Herzegovina.

== History ==
Anti-Fascist Council for the National Liberation of Yugoslavia or AVNOJ was a political body formed during World War II that inspired to represent all people of Yugoslavia. After capitulation of Italy and destruction of Chetnik army by the autumn of 1943 AVNOJ was recognized by Allies of World War II. On November 29–30, 1943 AVNOJ held it second congress in Jajce. Following Josip Broz Tito proposal, AVNOJ was proclaimed a legislative body, King Peter II of Yugoslavia and his government has been denied the right to represent Yugoslav peoples and banned from returning from exile. The new government - National Committee for the Liberation of Yugoslavia or NKOJ - has been formed, and Josip Broz Tito was granted title of Marshal, per Moša Pijade proposal. After formation of the Republic of Yugoslavia November 29 was celebrated as Day of the Republic, a national holiday.

== Building ==
The building was used previously by Sokol and constructed in 1934 by the architect Momir Korunović.

== See also ==
- Museum of Yugoslavia
- Bosnian nationalism
- List of museums in Bosnia and Herzegovina
