= 1st Proletarian Brigade =

First brigade-size formation raised by the Yugoslav Partisans

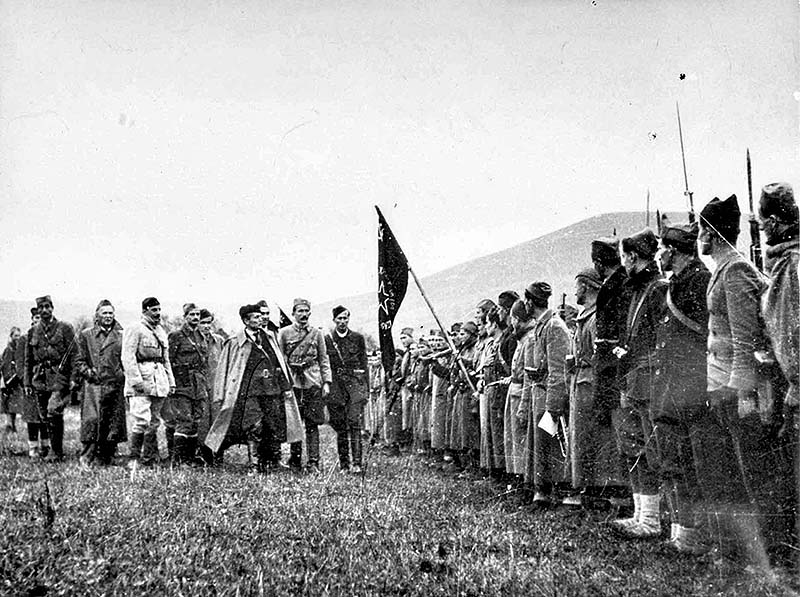
- Supreme Commander Tito inspects the First Proletarian Brigade in 1942
- Active: 22 December 1941–1945
- Disbanded: 1945
- Country: Yugoslavia
- Allegiance: Yugoslav Partisans
- Branch: Infantry
- Size: Brigade (1941-1942); Division (1942-1945)
- Engagements: World War II

Commanders
- Notable commanders: Koča Popović

The 1st Proletarian Brigade, later the 1st Proletarian Division, was the first brigade-size formation raised by the Yugoslav Partisans during World War II. The unit was one of the elite formations of the National Liberation Army of Yugoslavia. Its combat value was respected by the enemy. Artur Phleps, V SS Mountain Corps commander, in his war journal in 1944 assessed as a serious opponent, very well managed and well trained, who fights like a regular troop.

== Chronicle ==
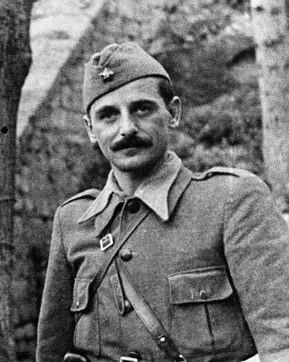
Koča Popović

It was formed by Josip Broz Tito and the Central Committee of the Communist Party of Yugoslavia on 22 December 1941 in the village of Rudo in Bosnia and Herzegovina. Initially comprising 1,200 of the best Serb and Montenegrin Partisans under the command of the Spanish Civil War veteran Koča Popović, it began to take on a more multi-ethnic character from March 1942 when 15 Bosniaks from Sarajevo joined the brigade. The formation of the brigade represented a significant change for the Partisans, as it gave the Partisan Supreme Command a politically reliable and mobile force that was not tied to a particular geographic area. This innovation allowed the Partisans to more easily concentrate fighting power at a particular point to achieve a decision, and permitted withdrawal when faced by a superior enemy force. The brigade fought its first battle on the day following its creation, when it encountered Italian troops and the Chetniks as it marched out of Rudo.

During Operation Southeast Croatia the brigade crossed Mount Igman in freezing temperatures. After Operation Trio, it participated in the Partisan Long March from Zelengora in eastern Bosnia to the west. The withdrawal of the brigade from eastern Bosnia to Foča caused a number of problems, including recriminations between Tito and Svetozar Vukmanović.

From its formation until June 1942 this was as an independent brigade, after which the brigade formed part of the Strike Group of Proletarian Brigades. From November 1942 the brigade became the 1st Proletarian Division. In 1971, the Museum of the First Proletarian Brigade was established in the village of Rudo to commemorate the unit.

At the time of formation, the Brigade numbered 1,186 soldiers, NCOs and officers, 71 of which were women. The brigade then fought in many battles against the Italians, Germans, and their Chetnik auxiliaries, as well as the forces of the Axis puppet Independent State of Croatia from its creation until the end of the war. It fought in six of the Seven Enemy Offensives described in Yugoslav historiography. During 41 months of battle engagement, in the unit fought 13,443 men and 651 women, and 4,818 of them died in battle.

== Battles ==
For the most part of its war time, the Brigade relied mostly on manoeuvrability and initiative. In frequent marches it covered some 20,000 km. The change in tactics occurred after Belgrade Offensive, when it was engaged in frontal battles on Sremski front.

Some important battles of 1st Proletarian Brigade
description	period	enemy
15–18 January 1942	Operation Southeast Croatia	Wehrmacht, NDH troops
20 April – 13 May 1942	Operation Trio	Wehrmacht, NDH troops, Italians
12 July 1942	Raid on Konjic	NDH troops
4–7 August 1942	Raid on Livno	NDH troops
24–26 September 1942	Raid on Jajce	NDH troops, Wehrmacht
24 November - 6 December 1942	Raid on Jajce	NDH troops, Wehrmacht
2–8 January 1943	Raid on Teslić	NDH troops, Wehrmacht
16 January 1943	Raid on Prnjavor	NDH troops, Wehrmacht
22 February - 15 March 1943	Operation Weiss II	Wehrmacht, NDH troops, Italians, Četniks
22 March 1943	Raid on Kalinovik	Četniks
7–10 April 1943	Crossing Drina	Italians, Četniks
15 May - 15 June 1943	Operation Schwarz	Wehrmacht, Italians
25–26 June 1943	Raid on Vlasenica	NDH troops
3–8 July 1943	Raid on Zvornik	NDH troops, Wehrmacht
11–27 September 1943	Defence of Split	Wehrmacht
15 October 1943	Raid on Travnik	NDH troops, Wehrmacht
29 November 1943	Raid on Travnik	NDH troops, Wehrmacht
6–24 December 1943	Operation Ziethen	Wehrmacht
17–18 December 1943	Raid on Livno	Wehrmacht, NDH troops
3–10 January 1944	Operation Waldrausch	Wehrmacht
2–3 May 1944	Raid on Mrkonjić Grad	Wehrmacht
25 May - 4 June 1944	Operation Rösselsprung	Wehrmacht
13–25 August 1944	Operation Rübezahl	Wehrmacht, Četniks
5–10 September 1944	Battle on Jelova gora	Četniks
5–22 October 1944	Belgrade Offensive	Wehrmacht
23 October 1944 – 14 April 1945	Sremski front	Wehrmacht, NDH troops
19–20 April 1945	Attack on Pleternica	Wehrmacht, NDH troops
6–8 May 1945	Attack on Vrbovec	Wehrmacht, NDH troops
