= Trident Peak =

Mountains named Trident Peak or variations:

- Trident Peak (Canada)
- Trident Peak (United States)
