= Sarajevo VRX Immersive Museum =

- Muzej virtualne stvarnosti Sarajevo (Bosnian)
- Established: September 18, 2023
- Location: Dalmatinska 4, Sarajevo, Bosnia and Herzegovina
- Type: Virtual reality museum
- Website: Official website

The Sarajevo VRX Immersive Museum is a virtual reality museum located in Sarajevo, Bosnia and Herzegovina.

== Location ==
The museum is situated in Dalmatinska Street, near the Central Bank of Bosnia and Herzegovina and the Blind Tiger café. It is accessible by public transportation, with the Drvenija tram stop located approximately 100 meters away.

== See also ==
- List of museums in Bosnia and Herzegovina
- Virtual reality
- History of Sarajevo
