= Planet Sarajevo =

Multimedia, interpretation museum in Sarajevo

- Planet Sarajevo - Interpretacijski centar (Bosnian)
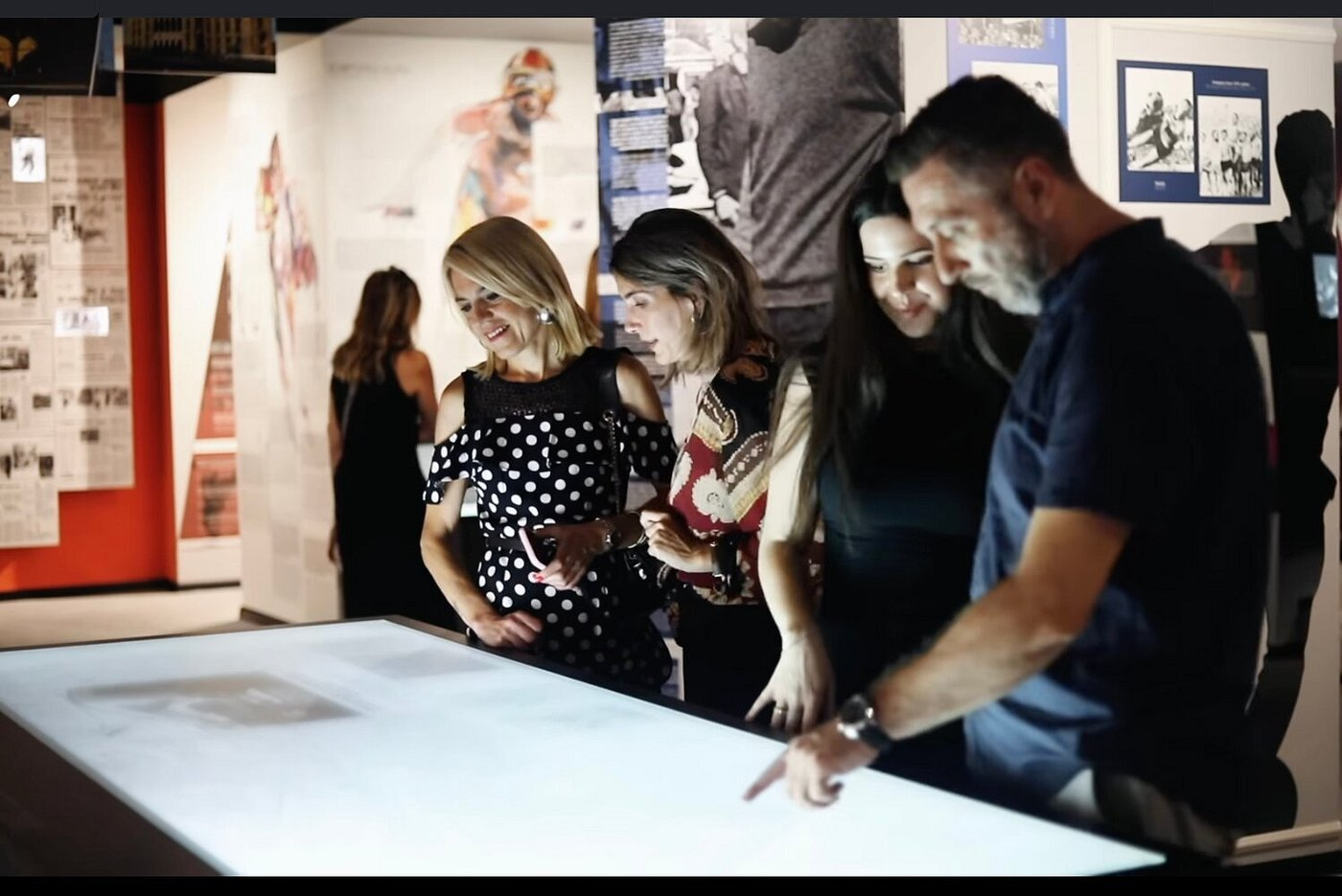
- Established: August 14, 2023
- Location: Maršala Tita 56, Sarajevo, Bosnia and Herzegovina
- Type: Immersive interpretation centre
- Website: planetsarajevo.ba

Planet Sarajevo is a contemporary multimedia and interpretive museum located in Sarajevo, Bosnia and Herzegovina. The museum focuses on the cultural and social history of Sarajevo between 1945 and 1992. It showcases the urban and cultural development, and everyday life during post-World War II redevelopment.

== Concept and exhibition ==
Planet Sarajevo is an immersive and interactive museum exhibition. This is seen through its multimedia content, with 30 screens showing original footage from 50s-80s, digitized archival materials and interviews with the people who shaped this era. It explores themes such as architecture and urban planning, music, film, sports, industry, media, and technological development during Yugoslav times.

The museum is a combination of audio-visual installations, personal narratives, archival documents, and interactive elements.

== Features ==
The museum uses contemporary exhibition technologies, including virtual reality (VR), immersive spatial installations, and interactive displays. The museum has specific exhibition segments dedicated to Sarajevo's music scene and the city's sports heritage, including references to the 1984 Winter Olympic Games held in Sarajevo.

Multilingual audio guides are available.

== Awards ==
- Vision 100 for Contribution to Cultural Innovation
- Best New Tourist Product
- XRCulture Recognition
- Inside/Outside Branding
- New Technologies
