= Museum of Modern Art of Republika Srpska =

Coordinates: 44.7723°N 17.1897°E

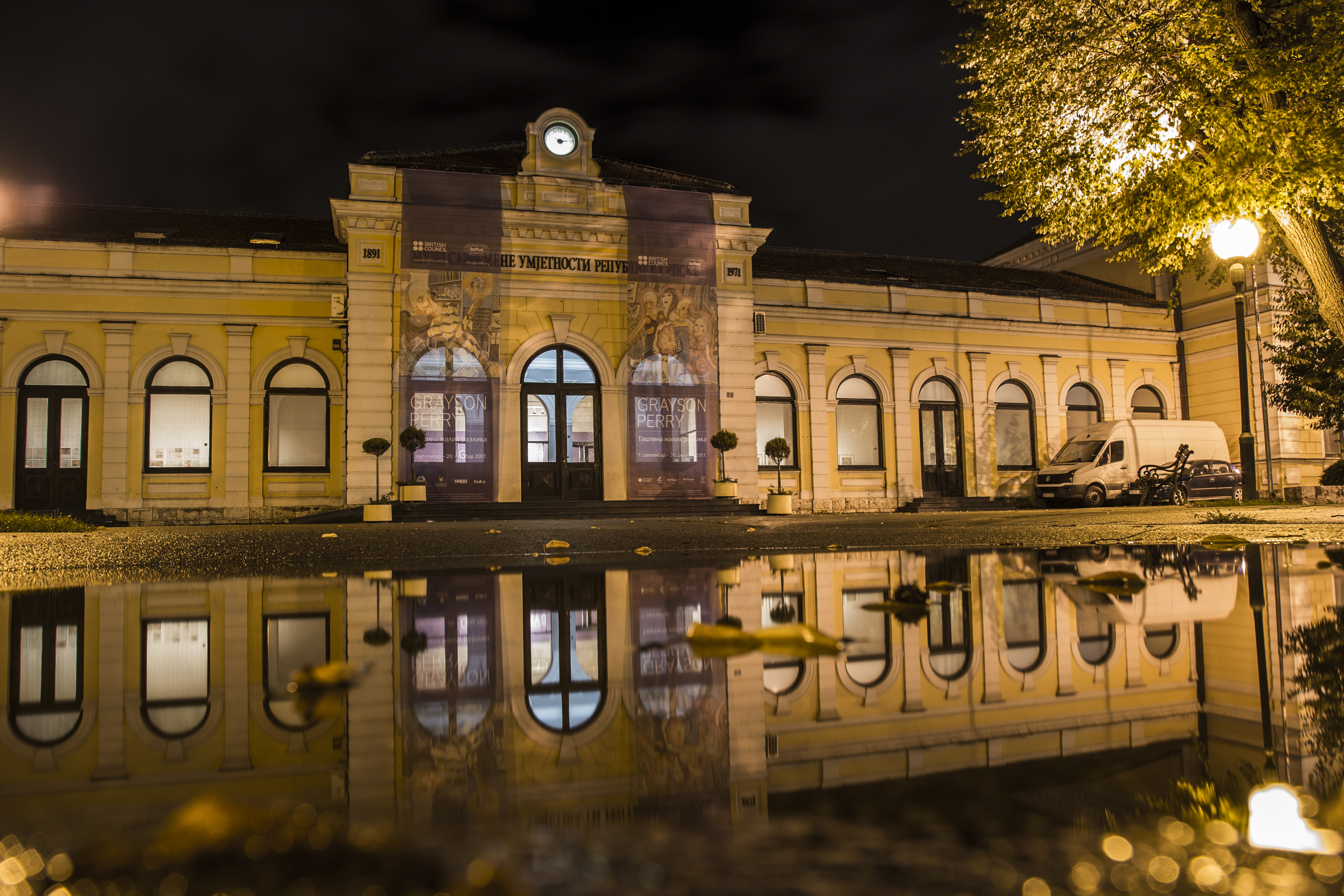
- Established: 1971; 55 years ago
- Location: Trg srpskih junaka 2, Banja Luka
- Type: Art museum
- Director: Sarita Vujković
- Website: msurs.net

The Museum of Modern Art of Republika Srpska (Serbian: Музеј савремене умјетности Републике Српске, romanized: Muzej savremene umjetnosti Republike Srpske) is an art museum in Banja Luka, Republika Srpska, Bosnia and Herzegovina. The museum has rebranded itself in recent years as the Museum of Contemporary Art of Republika Srpska.

== See also ==
- List of museums in Bosnia and Herzegovina
