= Trident Peak (United States) =

Mountain in the state of Nevada

Coordinates: 41°54′11″N 118°25′01″W

Trident Peak is a summit in the U.S. state of Nevada. The elevation is 8,254 feet (2,516 m).

Trident Peak was so named on account of its trident-shaped profile.
