= Gazi Husrev-bey Museum =

Museum in Sarajevo, Bosnia

Coordinates: 43.8597°N 18.4289°E

- Muzej Gazi Husrev-bega
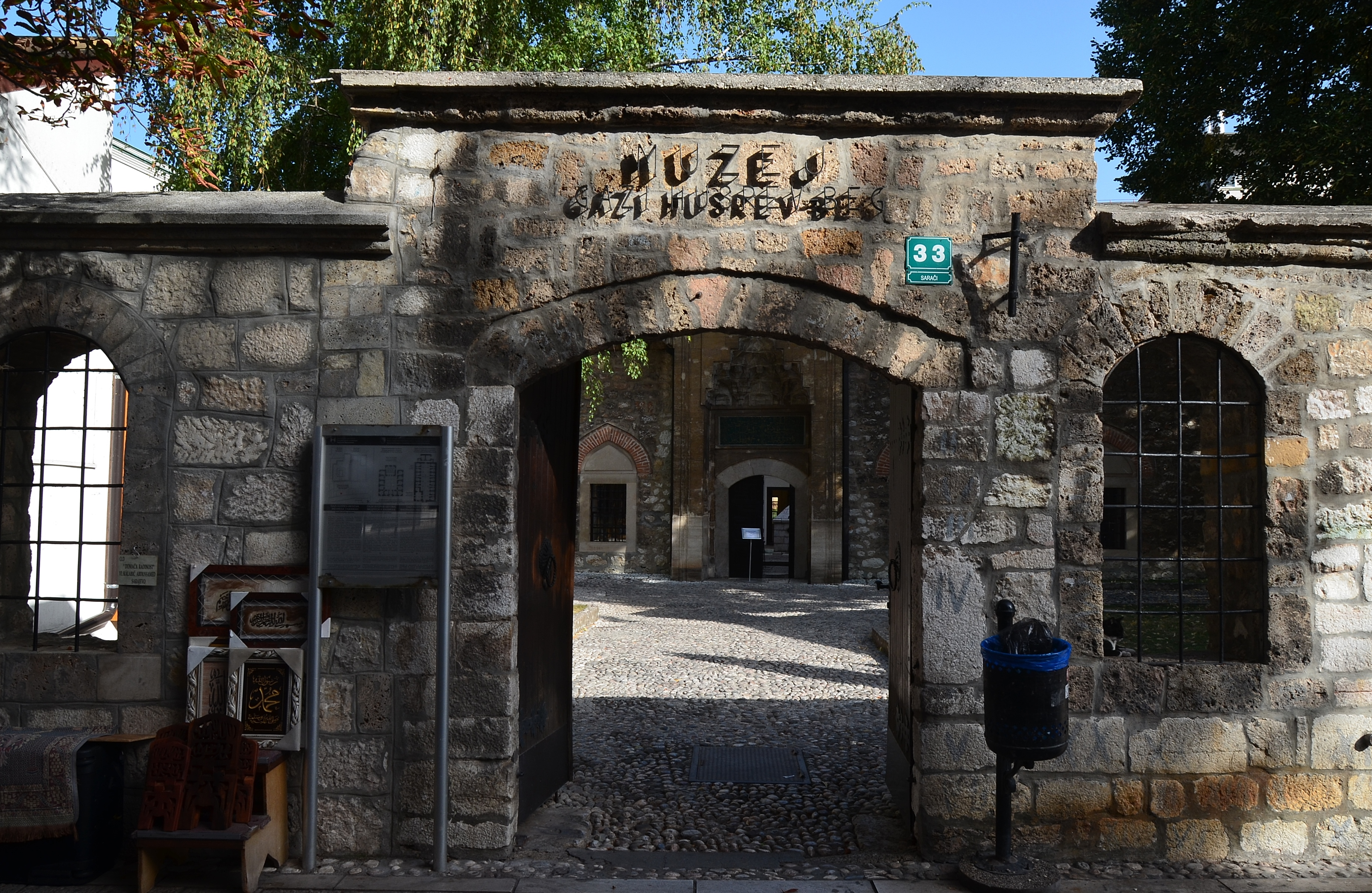
- Established: 2015
- Location: Sarači 33, Sarajevo, Bosnia and Herzegovina
- Type: History, Islamic art, Ethnography
- Website: www.vakuf-gazi.ba

The Gazi Husrev-bey Museum (Bosnian: Muzej Gazi Husrev-bega; Serbo-Croatian Cyrillic: Музеј Гази Хусрев-бега) is a cultural and historical museum located in Sarajevo, Bosnia and Herzegovina. Established in 2015, the museum is dedicated to preserving and showcasing the legacy of Gazi Husrev-beg (1480–1541), an Ottoman governor and benefactor of Sarajevo.

== History ==
The museum is housed in the historic Kuršumlija Madrasa, an educational institution built in 1537 by Gazi Husrev-beg himself. The madrasa was named "Kuršumlija" due to its distinctive lead-covered roof ("kuršum" meaning lead in Turkish). After serving various educational purposes over the centuries, the building was repurposed to house the museum, which officially opened its doors to the public in 2015.

== Exhibitions ==
The museum's permanent exhibition offers insights into the Islamic tradition of Bosniaks, featuring artifacts from various aspects of life. The collection comprises over 1,200 items, many of which were donated by the Gazi Husrev-beg Library.

== Architecture ==
The Kuršumlija Madrasa, now known as the Gazi Husrev Bey's Madrasa, is a piece of 16th century Ottoman architecture, notable for its lead-covered domes and pointed chimneys.

== See also ==
- Gazi Husrev-beg
- Gazi Husrev-beg Mosque
- Gazi Husrev-beg Library
- Gazi Husrev Bey's Madrasa
