= Sevdah Art House =

Coordinates: 43°51′31″N 18°25′52″E

- Art kuća Sevdaha (Bosnian)
- Established: 8 May 2008
- Location: Halači 5, Baščaršija, Sarajevo, Bosnia and Herzegovina
- Type: Music and cultural heritage museum
- Visitors: 26,700 (as of 2025)
- Website: sevdalinka.info

Sevdah Art House (Bosnian: Art kuća Sevdaha; Serbo-Croatian Cyrillic: Арт кућа Севдаха) is a cultural museum and café located in the historic Baščaršija district of Sarajevo, Bosnia and Herzegovina.

== Gallery ==
Sevdah Art House's Garden

Sevdah Art House's Coffee Shop

Sevdah Art House exhibit

Sevdah Art House

The Bosnian Lounge

Sevdah Art House exhibit

Sevdah Art House exhibit

== See also ==
- Sevdalinka
- Music of Bosnia and Herzegovina
- Baščaršija
