= Mount Sidney Dobson =

Mountain in Canada

Highest point
- Elevation: 2,630 m (8,630 ft)
- Prominence: 780 m (2,560 ft)
- Parent peak: Mount Sir James MacBrien
- Coordinates: 61.9708°N 127.6488°W

Geography
- Country: Canada
- Territory: Northwest Territories
- Parent range: Mackenzie Mountains
- Topo map: NTS 95L4 Mount Sir James MacBrien

Mount Sidney Dobson is a peak in the Ragged Range, Northwest Territories, Canada. The peak is 17 kilometers to the south of Mount Sir James MacBrien, its parent, and has an elevation of 2630 meters.

== Climbing history ==
The history of ascents on Mount Sidney Dobson is uncertain. At least four peaks in the area have been referred to by this same name by various maps and written sources, but the peak accepted today as Mount Sidney Dobson was likely climbed by Dudley Bolyard and party as part of the 1953 Yale Logan Expedition, who at the time referred to it by the name of Plymouth Peak.
