= Museum of the First Proletarian Brigade, Rudo =

Museum of the First Proletarian Brigade
- Muzej Prve proleterske brigade – Rudo
- Location within Republika Srpska Location within Bosnia and Herzegovina
- Established: 1971
- Location: Rudo, Republika Srpska, Bosnia and Herzegovina
- Coordinates: 43°37′04.4″N 19°21′58″E
- Type: Museum
- Architect: M. Bojer

The Museum of the First Proletarian Brigade is a museum in Rudo, Bosnia and Herzegovina. It was established in 1971 to commemorate the 30th anniversary of the formation of the 1st Proletarian Brigade, which was formed in the town in December 1941.

== History ==
Preparatory activities for the establishment of the Museum began in 1966 when a space was adapted in the town's former Cultural Centre (Dom Kulture), where documents relating to the formation and history of the First Proletarian NOV Brigade were exhibited. In the square outside the museum, a monument to the First Proletarian Brigade was created in 1961 (designed by architect Branko Kurpjel and incorporating mosaics by Branko Subotić), and at the entrance to the museum was a sculpture of Josip Broz Tito created by renowned Croatian sculptor Antun Augustinčić. In 1992, the latter was removed, and is now held in a private collection in Vojvodina.

In 1971, the Memorial Room of the First Proletarian Brigade was opened, with a new cultural centre and dedicated museum space planned the same year, according to the design of architect M. Bojer. This museum space was officially opened on 4 July 1976.

In late 1995, part of the museum's space was renovated to include a memorial room for soldiers of the VRS killed during the war in Bosnia and Herzegovina. Many of the original exhibits were removed, with a number of artistic works being sold by the municipality.

The museum is staffed by volunteers from the local SUBNOR committee.
