= Mount Nirvana =

Highest mountain in NWT, Canada

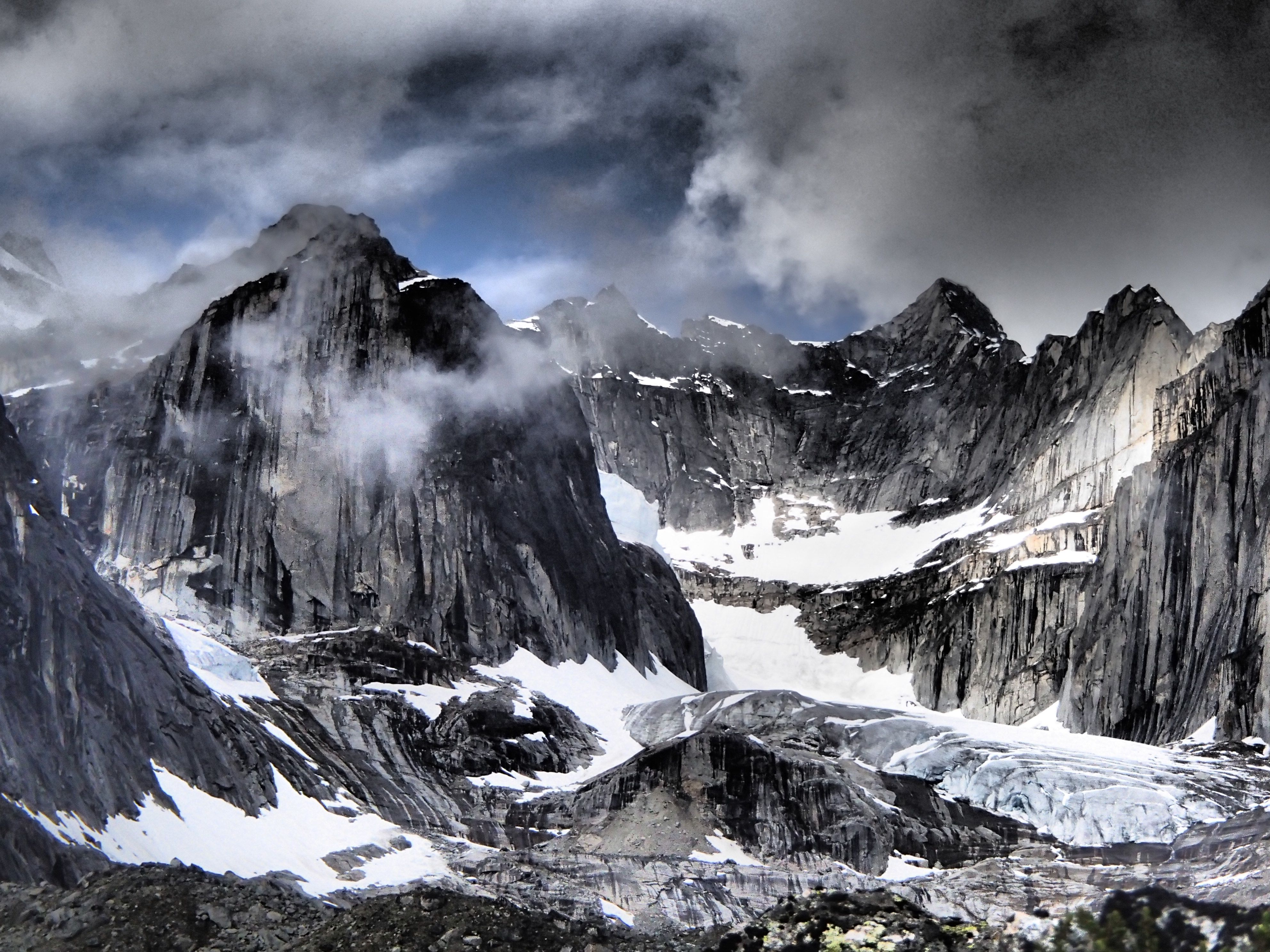
- The east face of Mount Nirvana in 2016

Highest point
- Elevation: 2,773 m (9,098 ft)
- Prominence: 1,663 m (5,456 ft)
- Listing: North America isolated peaks 89th; Canada highest major peaks 87th; Canada prominent peaks 87th; Canada most isolated peaks 27th; Canadian Subnational High Points 4th
- Coordinates: 61°52′29″N 127°40′49″W

Geography
- Location within Canada
- Location: Northwest Territories, Canada
- Parent range: Backbone Ranges in the Mackenzie Mountains
- Topo map: NTS 95E13 Mount Sidney Dobson

Climbing
- First ascent: July 29, 1965 by William J. Buckingham, Lewis J. Surdam
- Easiest route: North Wall

Mount Nirvana, at 2,773 m (9,098 ft) is the unofficial name of the highest mountain in the Northwest Territories, Canada. The mountain is a part of Nahanni National Park Reserve, the largest national park in the Northwest Territories.

== History ==
Part of the Mackenzie Mountains, it was first climbed by Bill Buckingham and Lew Surdam in July 1965. Buckingham gave the mountain the moniker of "Mount Nirvana" at that time.

Before 2016, only five successful ascents were recorded, all with the assistance of helicopters or floatplane. In June 2016, Nirvana was climbed without assistance for the first time.

== See also ==
- List of highest points of Canadian provinces and territories
- Mountain peaks of Canada
- List of mountain peaks of North America
