= Cirque of the Unclimbables =

Mountainous area in Northwest Territories, Canada

- Location within Canada Location within Northwest Territories
- Location: Inside the Nahanni National Park Reserve, Northwest Territories, Canada
- Nearest city: Fort Simpson; Fort Liard; Nahanni Butte
- Coordinates: 62°06′06″N 127°40′15″W
- Designation: Mountain

Cirque of the Unclimbables is a cluster of peaks located inside the Nahanni National Park Reserve in the Northwest Territories of Canada. Referred to by some as "The Forgotten Yosemite", the cirque is a popular destination for rock climbers and alpinists.

== Description ==
The Cirque of the Unclimbables is located within the Ragged Range, a subrange of the Logan Mountains, which are themselves a subrange of the Canada's Mackenzie Mountains. It contains nearly two dozen named peaks, subpeaks, and groupings of spires and is typically accessed from the east by boat travel up Brintnell Creek or via floatplane by landing on Glacier Lake.

The peaks were shaped at the end of the last ice age and are among the highest in Canada's northwest territories. In the summertime, the area is home to a diversity of wildlife including woodland caribou, mountain goats, Dall's sheep, and bears. The area referred to as "The Cirque" actually consists of multiple cirques, three of which are typically referenced by hikers and climbers who seek to access the peaks.

The First Cirque, located furthest east, is rimmed by over half a dozen peaks including Mount Peacock, Kleinspitze, Mount Proboscis, and Mount Contact. The Second Cirque, located to the west of the first includes Mount Harrison Smith, the Cathedral Peaks, and the Pentadactyl Spires. Bustle Tower, a popular climbing objective, juts out alone into the middle of the cirque. The Third Cirque, located furthest north and west, is encircled by many named peaks including Trident Peak, Parrot Beak Peak, and Lotus Flower Tower.

== History ==
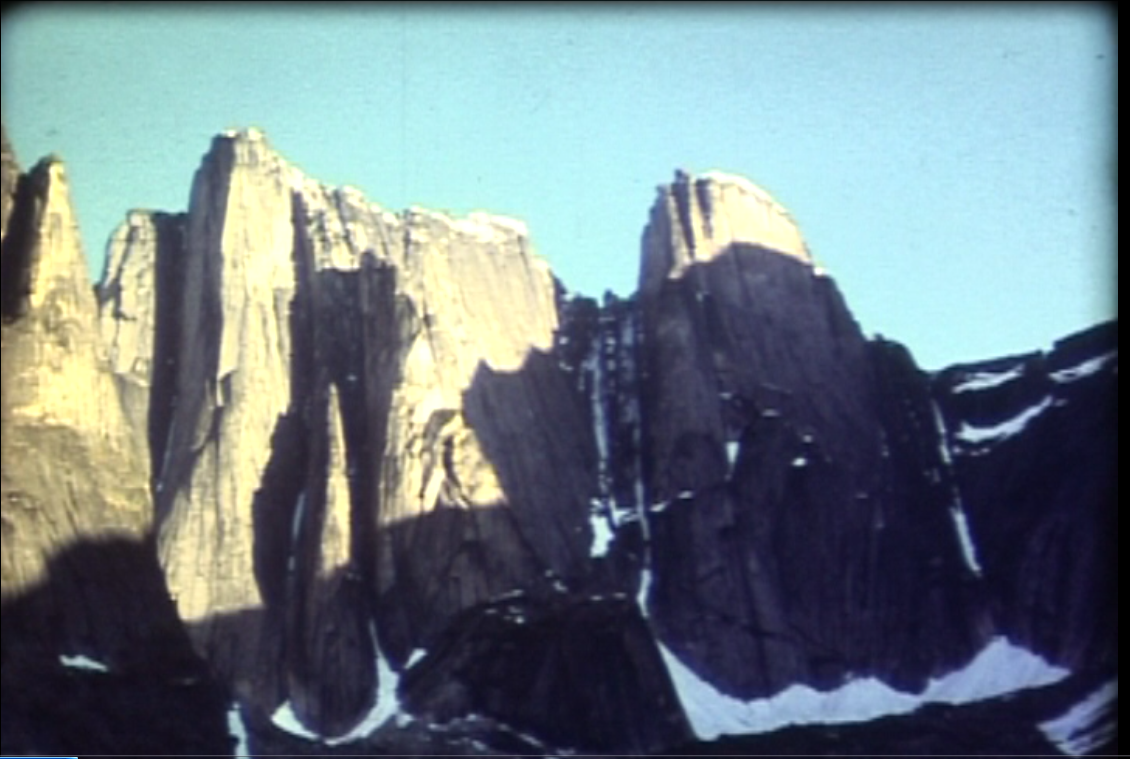
The Cirque of the Unclimbables walls in 1977.

Exploration of the general area surrounding the cirque dates back to the 1870s when explorers traveled by boat up the South Nahanni River during the Cassiar gold rush. In the 1930's, industrialist Harry Snyder became the first person to access the cirque by plane by landing on nearby Glacier Lake and attempted to name the nearby mountains the "Snyder Range". The range was later named the Ragged Range, but the nearby Mount Ida retains its name in honor of Snyder's wife. Several decades later, in 1950, geologist Dave Kingston made a stratigraphic reconnaissance along the South Nahanni River using a rubber boat.

Climbing began in the cirque with the Yale Logan Expedition in 1952, where a group led by Dudley Bolyard primarily explored the mountains to the south of the cirque, but ventured far enough north to make a first ascent of West Cathedral Peak. This became the first recorded ascent of any of the peaks in the cirque. Five years later, climber Arnold Wexler lead a party in the summer of 1955 that made a number of first ascents including Mount Contact, Mount Peacock, and Mount Harrison Smith. Wexler upon seeing the intimidating granite faces of many of the peaks, declared most of them "unclimbable" which ultimately gave the area its name.

The next major climbing expedition in the Cirque was led by William "Bill" Buckingham in the summer of 1960, where the group made many new first ascents including of the famed Lotus Flower Tower via its Northeast Ridge. Decades later, the Southeast Face route on Lotus Flower Tower was immortalized by Steve Roper and Allen Steck in their popular guidebook Fifty Classic Climbs of North America.

In the late 1990's and early 2000's, many expeditions to the area resulted in a spree of first ascents and the formation of many popular named routes including Brent's Hammer on Terrace Tower, Don't Get Piggy on Bustle Tower, and Pecking Order on Parrot Beak Peak.
