= Mount Sir James MacBrien =

Mountain in the Northwest Territories, Canada

Highest point
- Elevation: 2,759 m (9,052 ft)
- Prominence: 1,109 m (3,638 ft)
- Coordinates: 62°07′23″N 127°40′47″W

Geography
- Location: Northwest Territories, Canada
- Parent range: Mackenzie Mountains
- Topo map: NTS 95L4 Mount Sir James MacBrien

Climbing
- First ascent: 1955; 71 years ago
- Easiest route: Difficult scramble (SW)

Mount Sir James MacBrien is a peak in the Dehcho Region of Canada's Northwest Territories. The third highest peak in the Mackenzie Mountains, it is named after Major-General Sir James Howden MacBrien who was the head of the Canadian Militia in the mid-1920s.
