= Mackenzie Mountains =

Mountain range in northwestern Canada

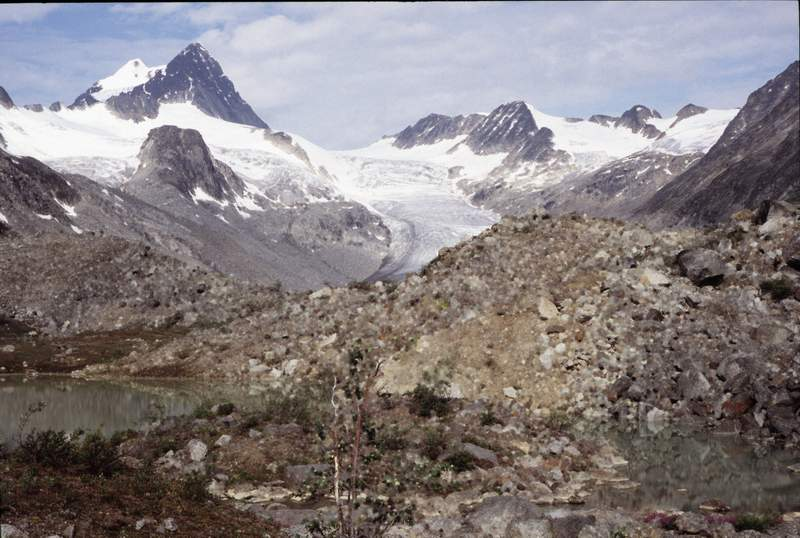
- Keele Peak, 2005

Highest point
- Peak: Keele Peak
- Elevation: 2,952 m (9,685 ft)
- Coordinates: 63°25′53″N 130°19′26″W

Geography
- Location within Northwest Territories Location within Yukon Location within Canada
- Country: Canada
- Territories: Yukon; Northwest Territories
- Range coordinates: 64°19′10″N 131°25′28″W

The Mackenzie Mountains are a Canadian mountain range forming part of the Yukon–Northwest Territories boundary between the Liard and Peel rivers. The range is named in honour of Canada's second prime minister, Alexander Mackenzie. Nahanni National Park Reserve and Nááts'ihch'oh National Park Reserve are in the Mackenzie Mountains.

The mining town of Tungsten, site of the Cantung Mine, is in the Mackenzie Mountains. Only two roads lead into the Mackenzie Mountains, both in Yukon: the Nahanni Range Road leading to the townsite of Tungsten and the Canol Road leading to the Macmillan Pass.

The highest mountain in this range is Keele Peak at 2,952 m (9,685 ft), in Yukon. The second-highest mountain is Mount Nirvana. It is, at 2,773 m (9,098 ft), the highest mountain in the Northwest Territories.

The Silurian fish family Archipelepididae has been described from specimens found in the Mackenzie Mountains.

What most distinguishes the Mackenzie Mountains from a geological standpoint is their anomalous tectonic setting. The range lies approximately 700 km east of the nearest plate boundary, yet it is actively uplifting and generating earthquakes today — a behaviour unexpected so deep within the interior of a continent. There is currently no scientific consensus explaining how or why the range formed and continues to grow at such a distance from a plate boundary. Geophysical evidence suggests the uplift may be linked to the collision of the Yakutat terrane with Alaska, transmitting stress through weak lower crust hundreds of kilometres into the continent's interior, though this hypothesis remains under investigation.

== Gallery ==
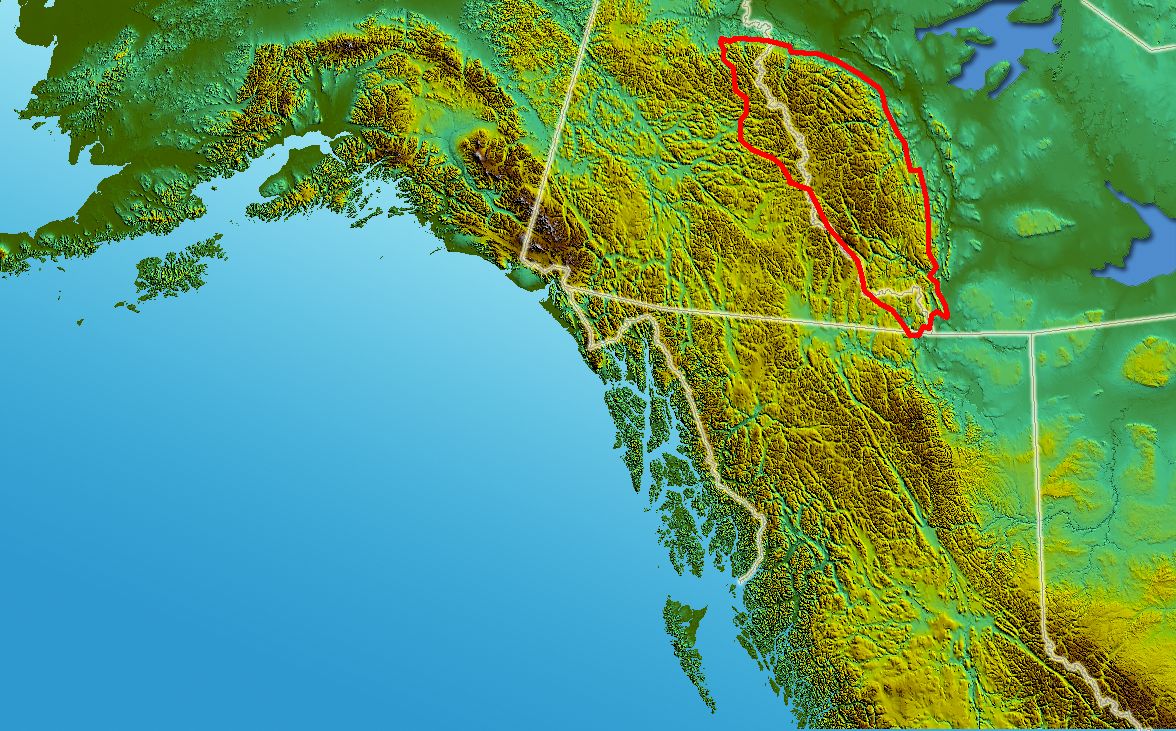
Topographic map of the Alaska Panhandle with Mackenzie Mountains circled in red
