= Gaspésie National Park =

Canadian provincial park in Quebec

Parc national de la Gaspésie
- IUCN category II (national park)
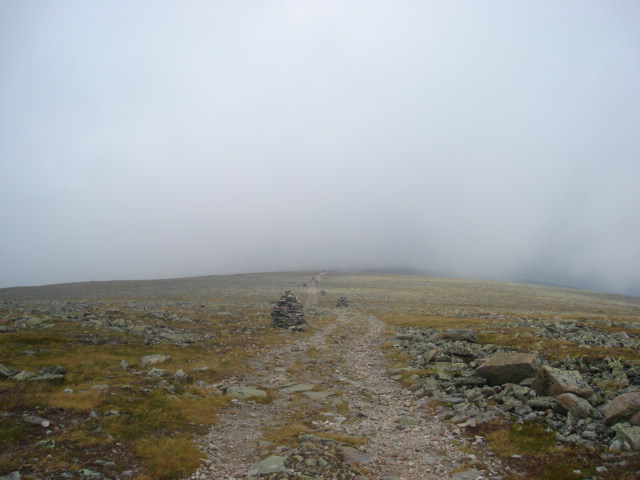
- Summit of Mount Jacques-Cartier

- Location within Quebec
- Interactive map of Parc national de la Gaspésie
- Location: La Haute-Gaspésie and La Matanie RCMs, Quebec, Canada
- Nearest city: Sainte-Anne-des-Monts
- Coordinates: 48°56′00″N 66°14′00″W
- Area: 80,200 hectares
- Established: November 25, 1981
- Governing body: Sépaq

Gaspésie National Park (French: Parc national de la Gaspésie) is the second-oldest provincial park in Quebec, established in 1937. The park is located to the south of the town of Sainte-Anne-des-Monts, Quebec, Canada, in the interior of the Gaspé peninsula. The park covers approximately 803 km² and is the sixth largest national park in Quebec.

Mi'kmaq indigenous groups have seasonally inhabited the Haute-Gaspésie region for at least 10,000 years. French settlers arrived in the surrounding regions in the 17th century, followed by British settlement in the 18th century. Most early settlement occurred in the coastal regions of the peninsula, with the complex terrain of the interior limiting European settlement and human disturbance in the region until the 19th century "era of discovery" expeditions.

The park contains two distinct mountain ranges: the Chic-Choc Mountains to the west and the McGerrigle Mountains to the east. The McGerrigle mountains contain the highest peak of the Appalachian Mountain range in Canada, Mont Jacques-Cartier, which sits at 1,270 metres above sea level. The two mountain ranges combined encompass more than 25 mountain peaks above 1,000 metres. The park is bordered to the west by the Chic-Chocs Wildlife Reserve and to the east by the Matane Wildlife Reserve.

The climate is characterized as subarctic, with cool temperatures and high precipitation. Dominant vegetation is characteristic of the boreal forest ecosystem, with three distinct vegetation zones, the montane, subalpine, and alpine zones occurring along altitudinal gradients. Rare, endemic plant species inhabit high altitude tundra environments, along with the last remaining Caribou populations (Rangifer tarandus caribou) south of the St. Lawrence River in Canada.

== Indigenous history ==
The Gaspé peninsula was first inhabited during the Paleo-Indian period (10,000 to 8,000 years ago) by ancestors of present-day First Nations groups of the Maritime provinces.

Nomadic Mik'maq indigenous groups seasonally occupied the Chic-Choc Mountains (referred to as “Sigusoq” in Mi'kmaq, meaning "bare cliff-like ridges") for approximately 11,000 years. Subsistence patterns were based on resource availability, with seasonal activities within the parc region including salmon fishing along the Saint-Anne River in spring and the hunting of bear, deer, caribou and moose, in the fall.

Jacques cartier first explored the Gaspé peninsula on 15 August 1535, claiming the land for the king of France. After the Treaty of Paris in 1763, the territory came under British rule. In the early decades of European occupation, settlers were confined to coastal regions where they established economies based on fishing. The rugged terrain of the interior peninsula limited European expansion until the 19th century, when exploration of the interior was facilitated by Mik'maq guides with knowledge of inland travel routes along rivers.

== European exploration (19th century) ==
The beginning of the "era of discoveries" in the mid 19th century saw the rise of expeditions within the Haute-gaspesie region. The creation of the Geological Commission of Canada in 1842 intensified geological exploration, with the aim to document the region's expansive land and mineral resources. Notable 19th century explorers include:

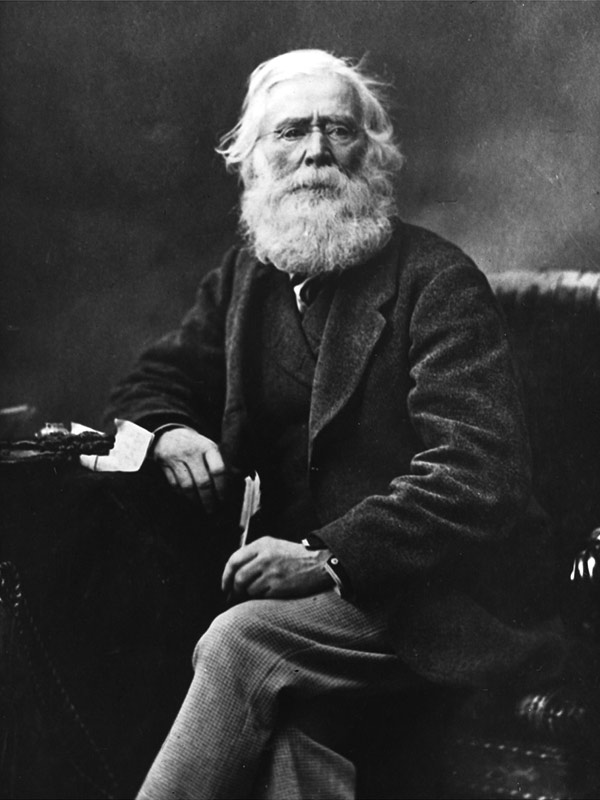
Sir. William Edmond Logan

Sir. William Edmond Logan (1798 - 1875), founder of the Geological survey of Canada. He first explored Riviere cap-chat, Mont Logan and Baie-des chaleurs in 1844 with the help of indigenous guides. Mont Logan is named in his honour.

James Richardson (1810 - 1883), a geologist employed by the Geological Survey of Canada who explored Mont-Jacques-Cartier and Mount Richardson in 1857. He was the founder of The Richardson Company which established numerous mills in the region and contributed to the rise of the forestry industry in Haute-Gaspésie. Mont Richardson is named in this honour.

Alexander Murray (1810 - 1884), a retired officer from the Royal Navy in Scotland who joined Sir. William E. Logan’s expeditions between 1843 and 1844. He explored Mont Albert on August 26, 1845, naming the mountain after Prince Albert, whose birthday it was that day. Alexander Murray's explorations involved Identifying the geological formations of the park and carrying out several surveys with the aim of mapping the territory.

== Development and park establishment (20th century) ==
The park was established on April 14, 1937, with the objective of protecting the rare McGerrigle and Mont Albert environments, preserving salmon populations in the Sainte-Anne River, conserving the remaining caribou populations, and promoting tourism in the Gaspé region. Initial parc boundaries covered 912 km². The objectives for the initial establishment of the park and its protected status changed over time, influenced by the adoption of certain laws, changing governments, and events such as World War II.

=== World War II ===
During World War II, Canadian armed forces occupied posts on the summit of Mont Jacques-Cartier between 1942 and 1945. Roads and buildings constructed within the park to support military operations.

=== Mining and forestry ===
Increased recognition of the park's natural resources led to the modification of park protection laws on March 18, 1938, to allow forestry and mining projects. In 1943, the Quebec Government permitted mineral exploration within the park, granting the Mount Albert Mining Company the rights to prospect and explore over 75 km² for a period of five years.

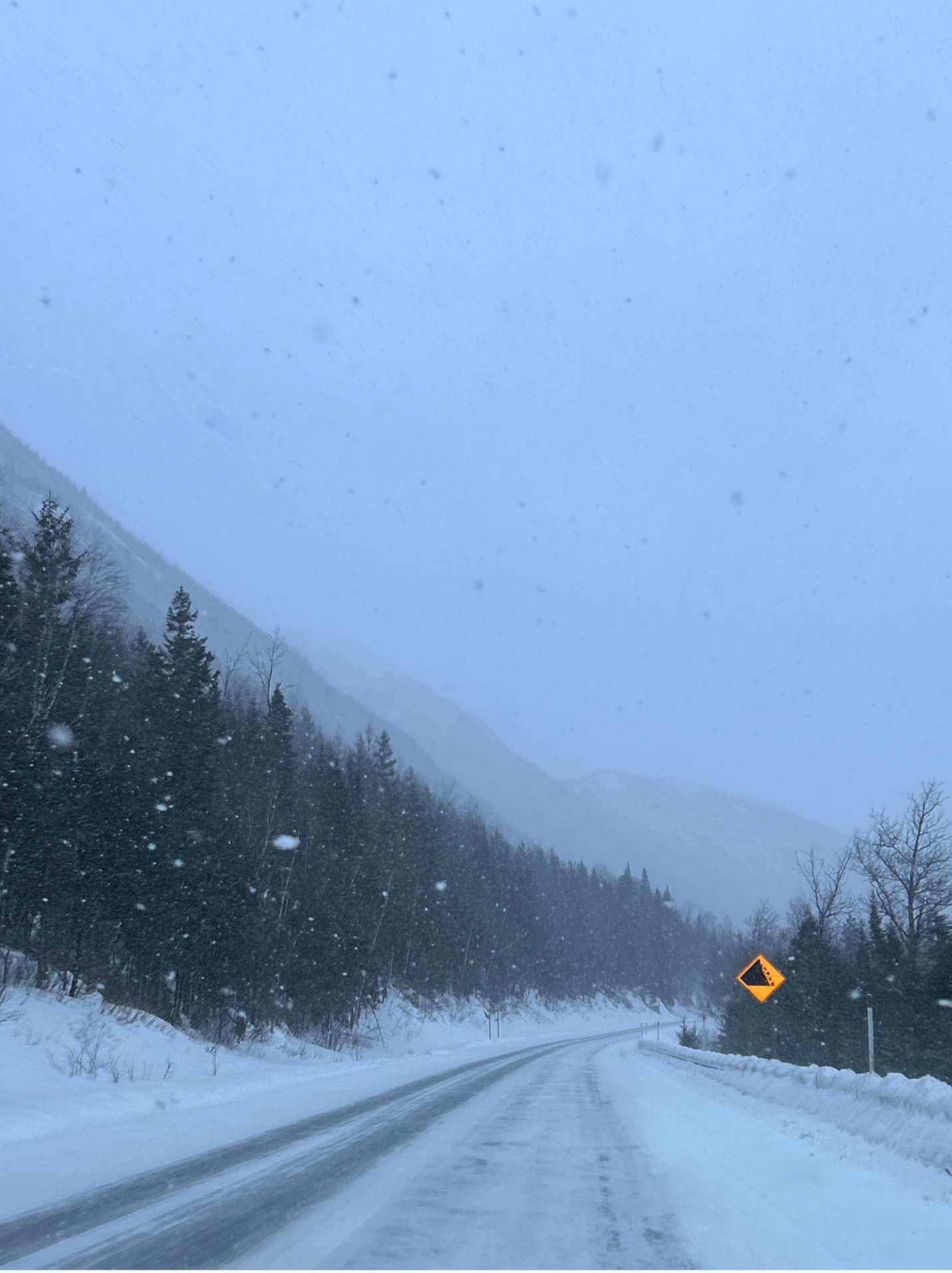
Route 299 within the park

In 1963, mining exploration was expanded, and permits were authorized across the entire park territory. Mining activities were concentrated in the southern sector of the park, particularly in the McGerrigle Mountains. Madeleine mine was opened in June 1969, from which more than eight million tons of ore were extracted before the mine's closure in 1982.

=== Route 299 ===
The construction of the Transgaspésienne road (Route 299) was instrumental in facilitating forestry and mining operations in the interior regions. Constructed finished in autumn 1955, with Route 299 covering 140 km from the Sainte-Anne-des-Monts to Baie-des-Chaleurs regions.

=== Stronger protection measures ===
Intensive resource exploitation in the 20th century altered the natural landscape and contributed to a 60-80% decline in the Gaspésie caribou population. As a result, stronger protection measures were established in 1977 with the Parks Act, establishing a legal framework to ensure the conservation and permanent protection of the park. In 1999, the Quebec government adopted stricter protection laws within the park, with criteria established by the International Union for Conservation of Nature.

== Tourism ==
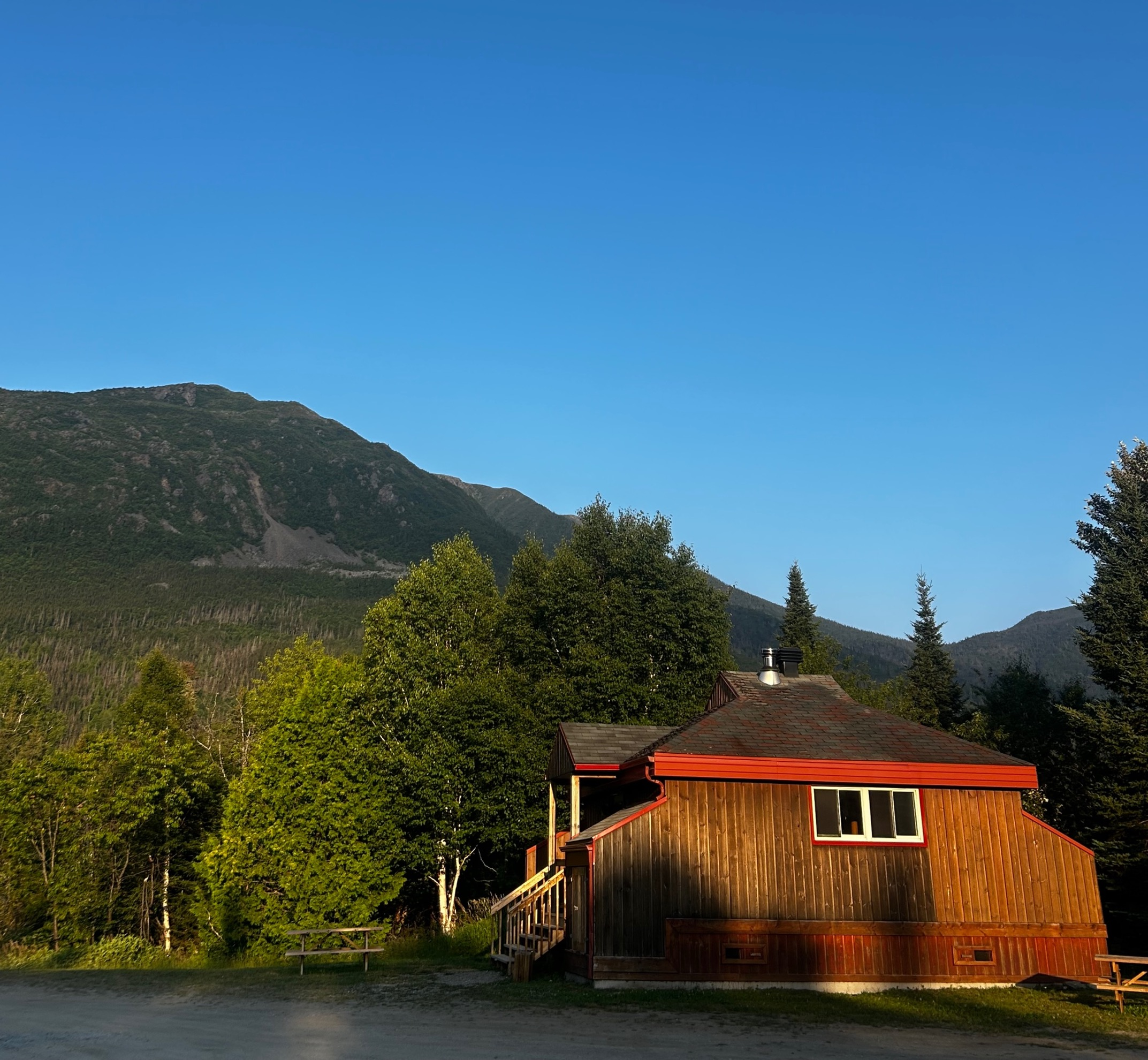
Cabin in the Gaspesie National Park. Mont Albert can be seen in the background.

The park's visitor center opened for the first time in 1986. Recreational and cultural activities offered within the park include land-based sports such as biking, cross-country skiing and hiking, with 20 hiking trails of varying difficulty. Water-based sports offered within the park include kayaking, canoeing and fishing. The park receives approximately 221,000 visitor days annually. Accommodations within the park include campsites, huts, cabins, and the Gîte du Mont-Albert hotel.

== Geography ==
The park is located within the western interior region of the Gaspé peninsula, within the Gaspésie massif and Gaspésie massif highland ecodistricts. The park is located to the south of the town of Sainte-Anne-des-Monts, Quebec, within the regional municipalities of La-Haute-Gaspesie and La Matanie. The park is bordered to the west by the Chic-Choc Wildlife Reserve and to the east by the Matane wildlife reserve.

== Geology ==
Deglaciation in the region occurred around 13,000 to 9,000 years before present (BP), beginning along coasts and progressing to inland regions around 10,500 to 10,000 BP. The park's geomorphology was shaped by subsequent glacial erosion, which produced a landscape of high peaks, block fields, steep ridges, and deep valleys. The park encompasses two geologically distinct mountain ranges; the Chic-Choc Mountains and the McGerrigle Mountains.

=== Chic-Choc Mountains ===
The Chic-Choc Mountain range form part of the Canadian Appalachian Mountains, located to the west of the Saint-Anne River. The mountains extend 95 kilometres in length and 10 kilometres in width. Formation of the range occurred around 600 million years ago, through underwater volcanic activity and tectonic uplift of the Earth's crust. The rocks are of volcanic and sedimentary origin and have been gradually eroded over time by weathering processes and glacial retreat.

The Chic-Choc Mountain range within the park includes 11 mountain peaks above 1000 metres elevation, including Mont Albert (1,088 to 1,154 metres). Mont Albert has a plateau composed of serpentinized peridotite covering approximately 15 km² and remains the only location in Quebec where ultramafic serpentine substrate occupies an alpine environment.

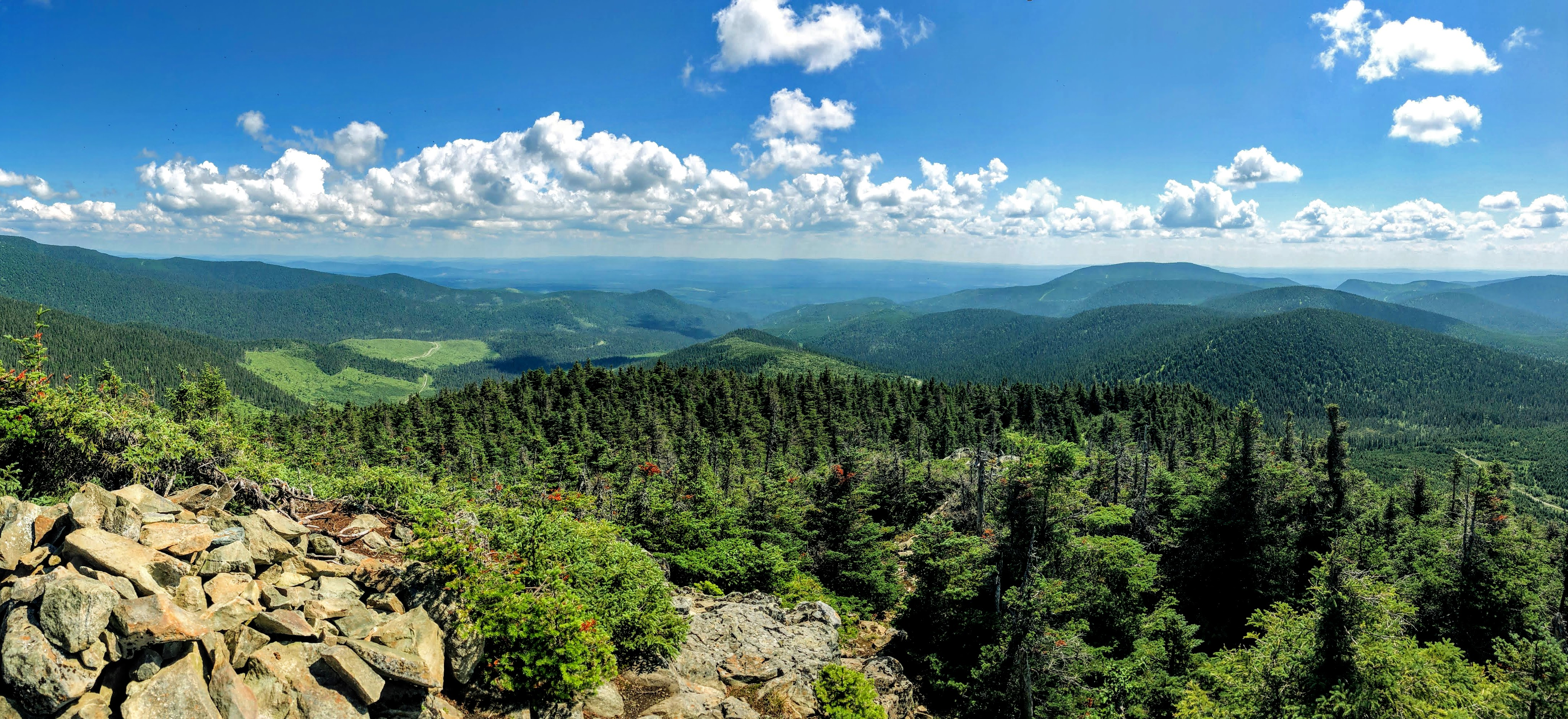
Chic-Choc mountains

=== McGerrigle Mountains ===
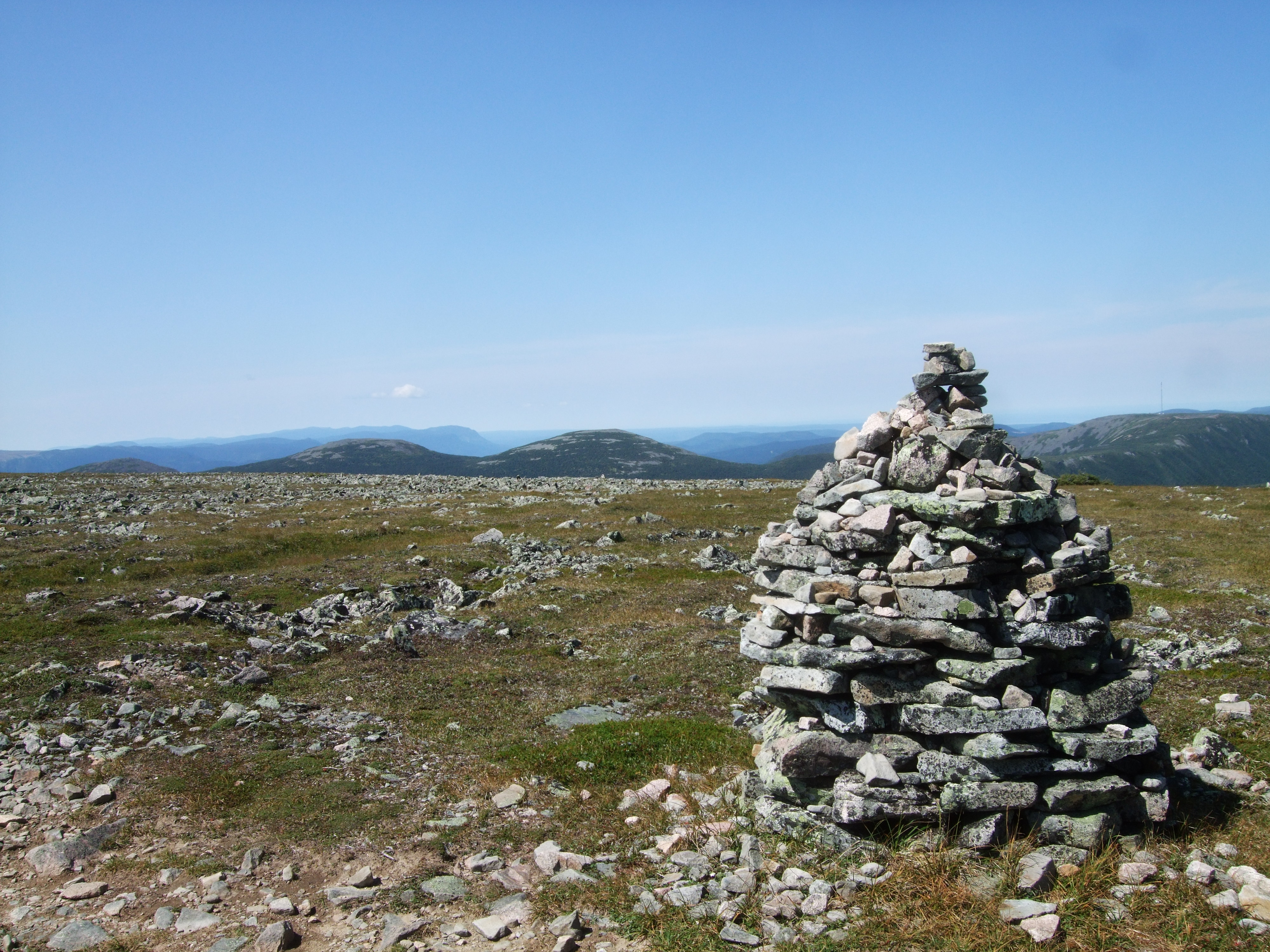
Mont Jacques-Cartier summit

The McGerrigle Mountains are located to the west of the Sainte-Anne River and cover an approximate area of 100 km². The range formed around 380 million years ago through the intrusion of magma within the Earth's crust. The cooled magma formed a large underground granitic batholith, with erosional processes over time eroding the overlaying sedimentary rocks and leaving the resistant granite exposed.

The McGerrigle mountain range within the park includes 17 mountain peaks above 1000 m elevation, including Mont Jacques-Cartier (1,270 m). The summits features block fields, polygonal soils, other periglacial features.

== Climate ==
Under the Köppen climate classification, the park has a continental subarctic climate, characterized by long, cold winters and short, mild summers. Unlike the lowland coastal regions of the Gaspé peninsula which experience a more humid and regulated climate due to their proximity to the Atlantic Ocean, the climate of the inland regions is primarily influenced by latitude and elevation. At higher elevations, lower temperatures combined with lower atmospheric pressure cause moisture to condense, resulting in high levels of precipitation in the form of rain or snow. The highland regions are among the wettest regions in Quebec.

== Ecology ==
=== Vegetation zones ===
The park is situated within the boreal forest zone, with dominant vegetation characteristic of the balsam fir - white birch domain. Topographic variability within the park contributes to a complex ecological environment where typical features of eastern Canadian forests combine with Arctic, subarctic and alpine-subalpine conditions.

Vegetation composition varies with elevation, forming three distinct zones: the montane zone (60 to 900 metres), the subalpine zone (900 to 1,000 metres) and alpine zone (above 1100 metres). The Alpine zone is the southernmost refuge for Arctic lichen species in eastern North America.

=== Floristic habitat ===
The park includes 27 km² of designated floristic habitat, a protected classification for areas containing at least one plant species identified as threatened or vulnerable. This designation primarily refers to the alpine tundra environments, where endemic plant species persist under harsh environmental conditions.

Legally protected rare species found on Mont Albert include the endemic green-scaled willow and the Mont Albert goldenrod. The only population of green-scaled willow occurs on the mountain, consisting of approximately 200 shrubs. The green scaled-willow is classified as threatened in Quebec under the E-12.01 Act respecting threatened or vulnerable species. Other rare species include the western American rock fern and serpentine Minuartia.

Mont Logan also contains protected floristic habitat due to the presence of three threatened plant species: Griscom's arnica, false ivy-leaved groundsel, and alpine athyrium.

=== Plant species at risk in the Gaspésie National Park ===
Scientific name	Image	Common name(s)	Family	Status	Ref.
Arnica griscomii		Griscom’s arnica, snow arnica	Asteraceae	Threatened (m)	
Aspidotis densa		Dense lace fern, Indian's dream, serpentine fern	Pteridaceae	Threatened	
Athyrium distentifolium var. americanum		American alpine lady fern	Athyriaceae	Threatened	
Minuartia marcescens		Serpentine stitchwort	Caryophyllaceae	Threatened	
Polystichum scopulinum		Mountain hollyfern, rock fern, rock sword fern	Dryopteridaceae	Threatened	
Salix chlorolepis		Green scaled willow	Salicaceae	Threatened	
Packera cymbalaria		False ivy-leaved groundsel	Asteraceae	Threatened	
Solidago chlorolepis		Green-bracted goldenrod	Asteraceae	Threatened	
Matteuccia struthiopteris var. pensylvanica		American ostrich fern	Onocleaceae	Vulnerable to harvesting	
Valeriana uliginosa		Bog valerian	Caprifoliaceae	Vulnerable	
Adiantum aleuticum		Aleutian maidenhair fern	Pteridaceae	likely to become threatened or vulnerable	
Agoseris aurantiaca		Orange agoseris, orange False Dandelion	Asteraceae	likely to become threatened or vulnerable	
Galearis rotundifolia		Round-leaved orchis, Round-leaved orchid, small round-leaved orchid	Orchidaceae	likely to become threatened or vulnerable	
Calypso Bulbosa		Fairy slipper orchid, venus' slipper	Orchidaceae	likely to become threatened or vulnerable	
Carex cumulata		Clustered sedge	Cyperaceae	likely to become threatened or vulnerable	
Carex macloviana		Falkland Islands sedge	Cyperaceae	likely to become threatened or vulnerable	
Cerastium cerastoides		Starwort Chickweed, Mountain Chickweed	Caryophyllaceae	likely to become threatened or vulnerable	
Festuca altaica		Altai fescue, Northern rough fescue	Poaceae	likely to become threatened or vulnerable	
Halenia deflexa		Green gentian, spurred gentian	Gentianaceae	likely to become threatened or vulnerable	
Arenaria grandiflora		Large-flowered sandwort	Caryophyllaceae	likely to become threatened or vulnerable	
Poa infirma		Early meadow-grass, weak bluegrass	Poaceae	likely to become threatened or vulnerable	
Ranunculus allenii		Allen’s buttercup	Ranunculaceae	likely to become threatened or vulnerable	
Rhynchospora capillacea		Needle beaksedge, slender beakrush, needle beakrush	Cyperaceae	likely to become threatened or vulnerable	
Sagina nodosa		Knotted pearlwort	Caryophyllaceae	likely to become threatened or vulnerable	
Sagina saginoides		Arctic pearlwort,	Caryophyllaceae	likely to become threatened or vulnerable	
Sisyrinchium angustifolium		Narrow-leaved blue-eyed grass	Iridaceae	likely to become threatened or vulnerable	

=== Wildlife ===
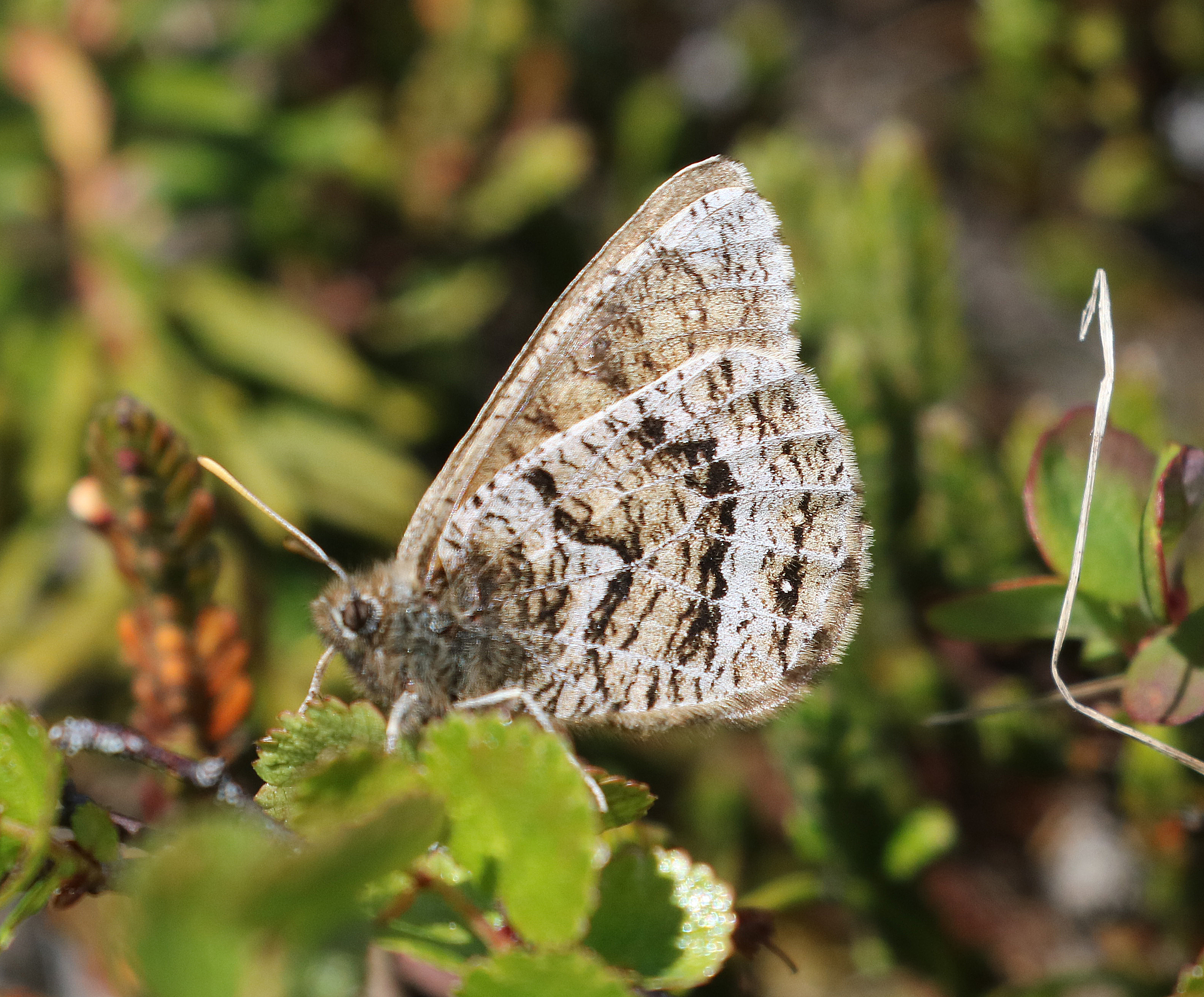
White-veined Arctic butterfly (Oeneis bore)

Wildlife within the montane zone includes mammals such as the white-tailed deer, coyote, black bear, red fox, porcupine, lynx, and moose. The alpine zone and old-growth coniferous stands at lower elevations support the last remaining woodland caribou herds south of the St. Lawrence river. The park is also home to 156 bird species, including the horned lark, white-throated sparrow, golden eagle, harlequin duck and Bicknell’s thrush.

The Artic-alpine environment hosts many cold-adapted insects and other invertebrates, including the Arctic wolf spider, 1 of 240 spider species found within the park, as well as the Canadian tiger swallowtail and the white-veined Arctic butterfly.

Species at risk within the park include 11 bird species, 6 mammal species, 2 fish species, and 4 insect species.

=== Endangered caribou ===
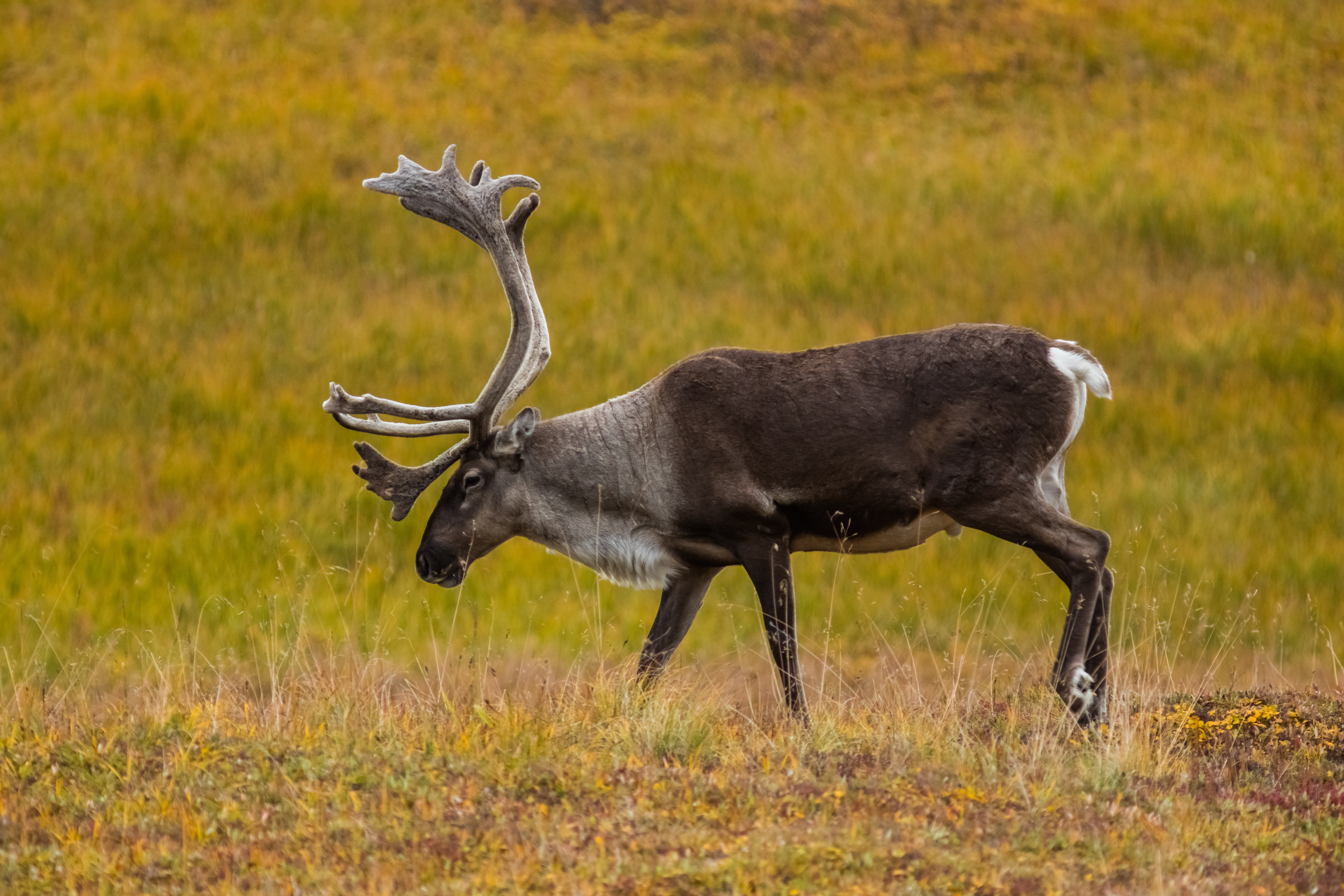
Caribou (Rangifer tarandus)

The Woodland Caribou (Rangifer tarandus caribou), Atlantic-Gaspésie population was listed as Endangered in Canada under the Species at risk act in 2002 and as Threatened in Quebec under the Act respecting threatened or vulnerable species in 2009. The Atlantic-Gaspésie caribou once inhabited the Gaspé peninsula, maritime provinces, and parts of New England. As of 2020, the only 32-36 individuals remain within the entire historical range, with the last three remaining populations restricted to the Mont Logan, Mont Albert and Mont Jacques-Cartier sectors within the park. Habitat loss due to logging, particularly during the 20th century, is considered the primary cause for their decline, along increased predation from bears and coyotes. Former caribou-suitable habitats have yet to recover from forestry activities that occurred within and outside park boundaries up until 1970.

== Conservation ==
The management of the Gaspésie National Park is guided by the Parc national de la Gaspésie conservation plan (2022-2027), developed by the Société des établissements de plein air du Québec. The conservation plan focuses on 3 key areas: Conservation targets (including species, ecosystems, and cultural features), conservation issues affecting those targets, and vulnerabilities representing future known and unknown risks.

The primary conservation target is the Atlantic-Gaspésie caribou. Outlined objectives to be achieved by 2027 include reducing habitat disturbance and limiting recreational impacts through the restoration of old forest roads, habitat restoration, reduced visitor access and increased education.

Other conservation targets requiring monitoring include forest ecosystems, arctic-alpine environments, aquatic and wetland environments and the Atlantic salmon population, which has experienced a population decline since 2011.

Vulnerabilities outlined within the plan include moose overpopulation, invasive plants, and road and culvert infrastructure.

Conservation vulnerabilities and management actions for Gaspésie National Park
Vulnerability	Reason for concern	Actions	Ref.
Moose overpopulation	Potential threat to forest regeneration due to overgrazing	Aerial surveys, forest regeneration research, development of a moose management plan	
Invasive plants	Threatens rare species endemic to the mountain and alpine tundra ecosystems	Creation of a species distribution atlas, development of an invasive species management plan	
Road infrastructure and culverts	Potential threat to river ecosystems. Increased sediment pollution and restricted fish movement	Upgrading crossing infrastructure, improve water flow and habitat quality	

== Gallery ==
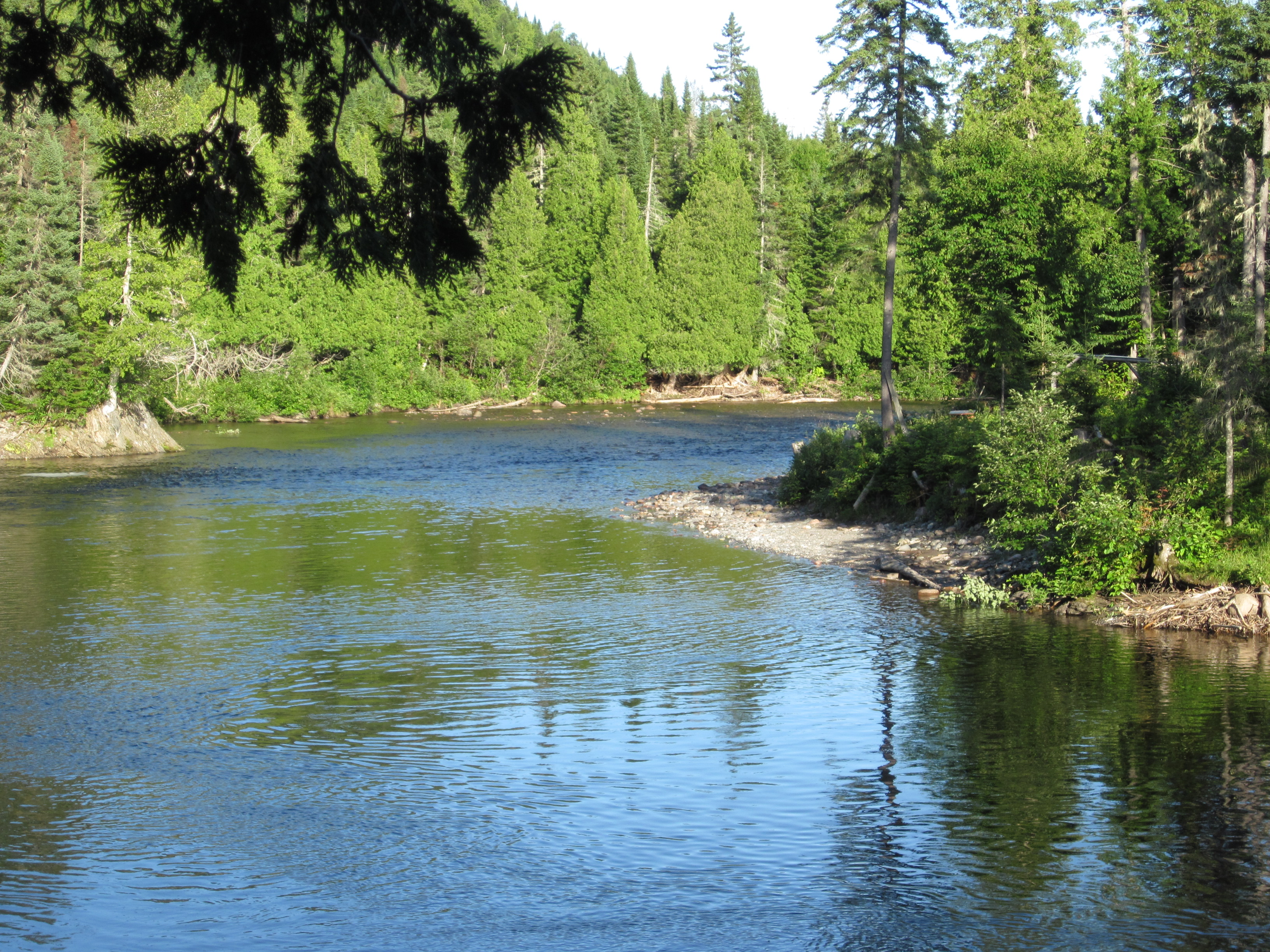
Sainte-Anne River

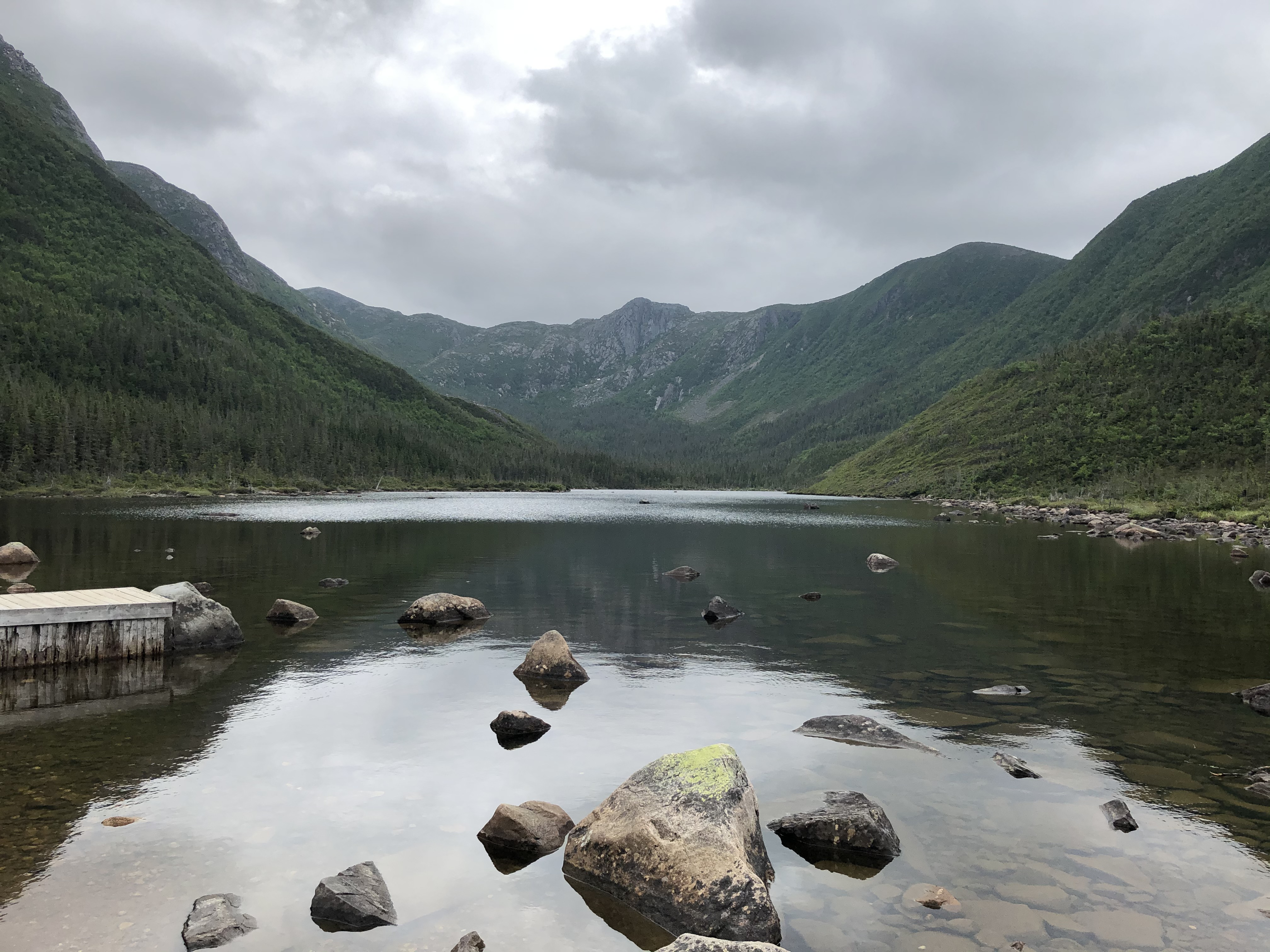
Lac aux Américains

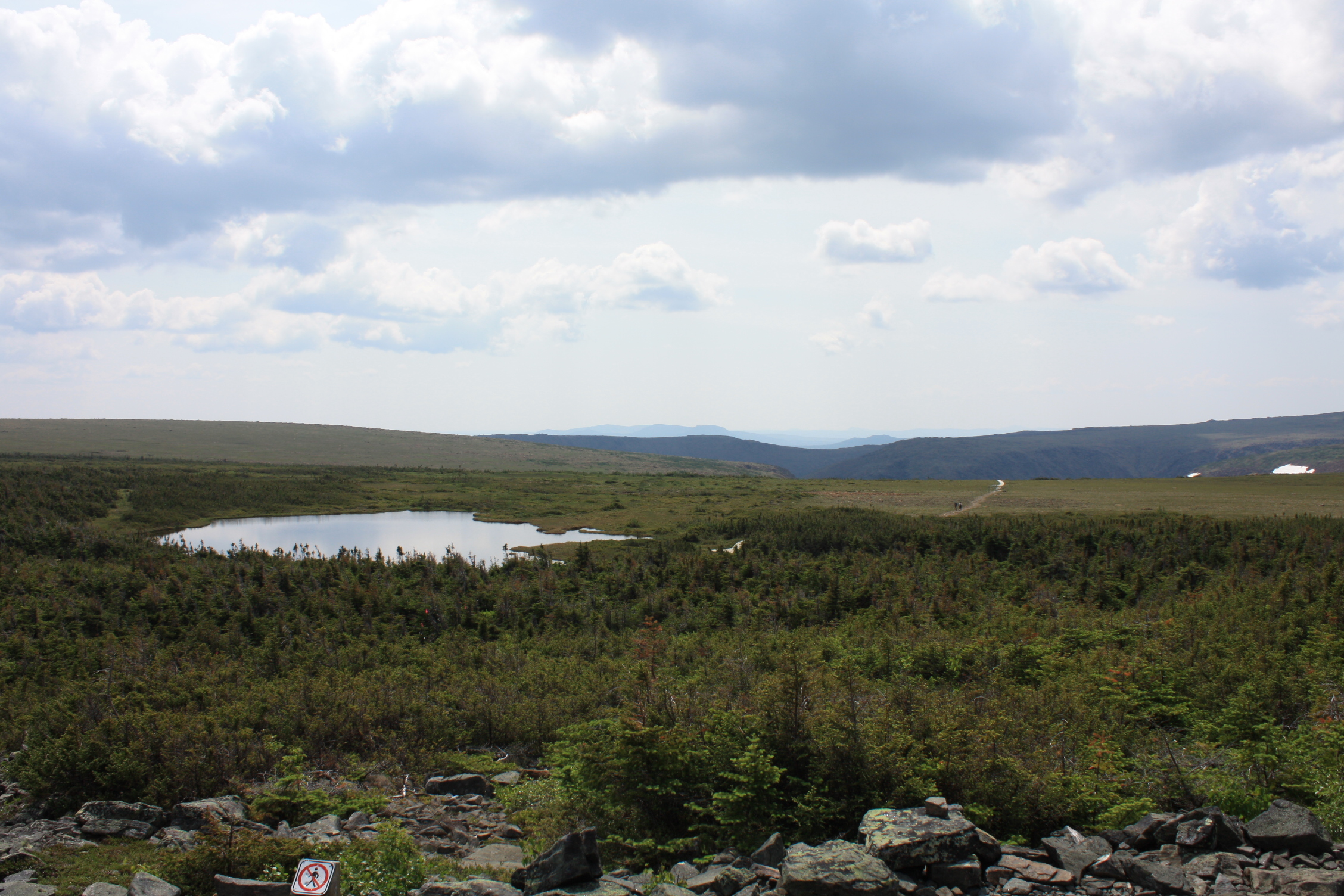
Mont Albert summit plateaux

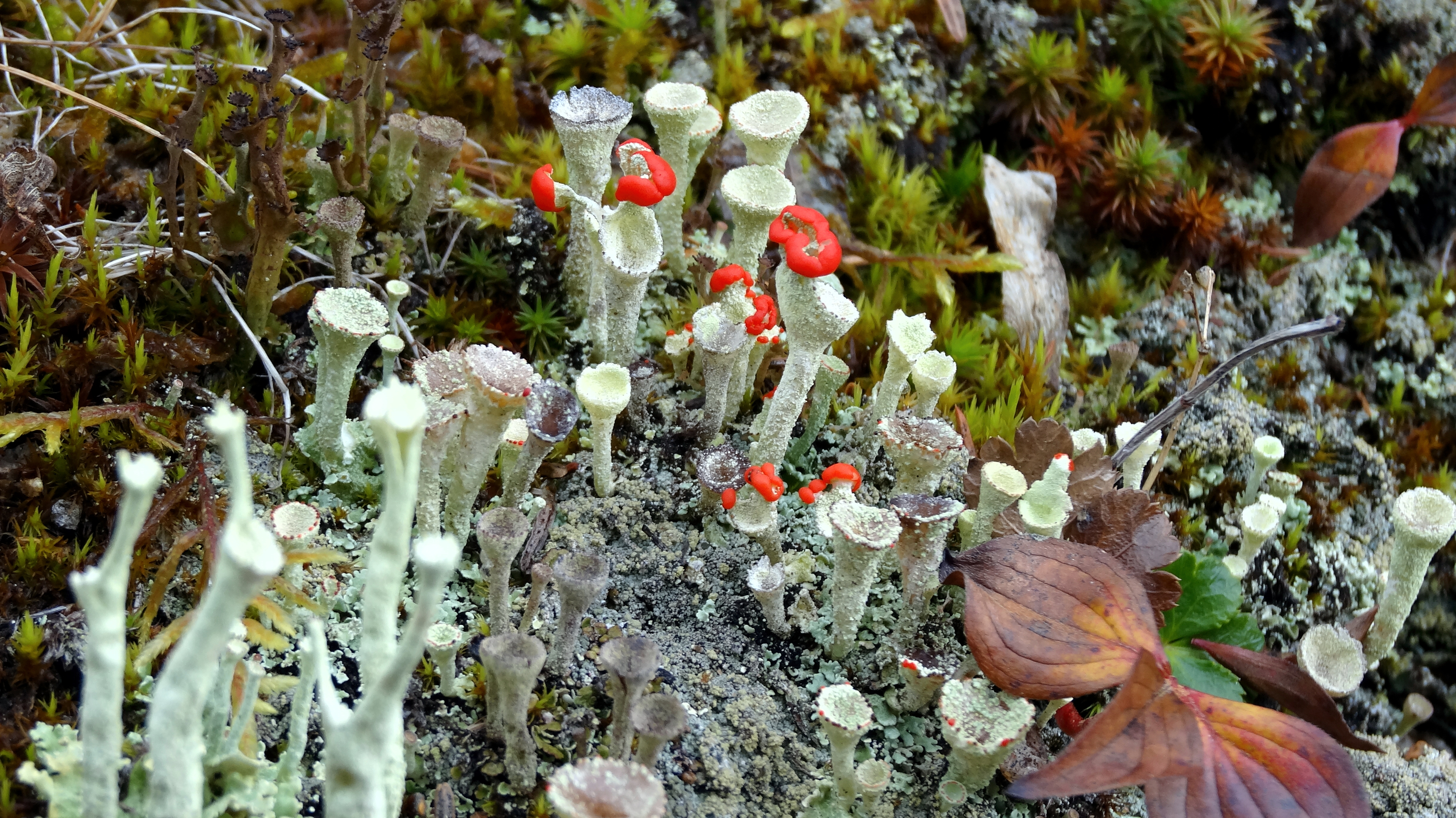
Lichen found on Mont Joseph-Fortain

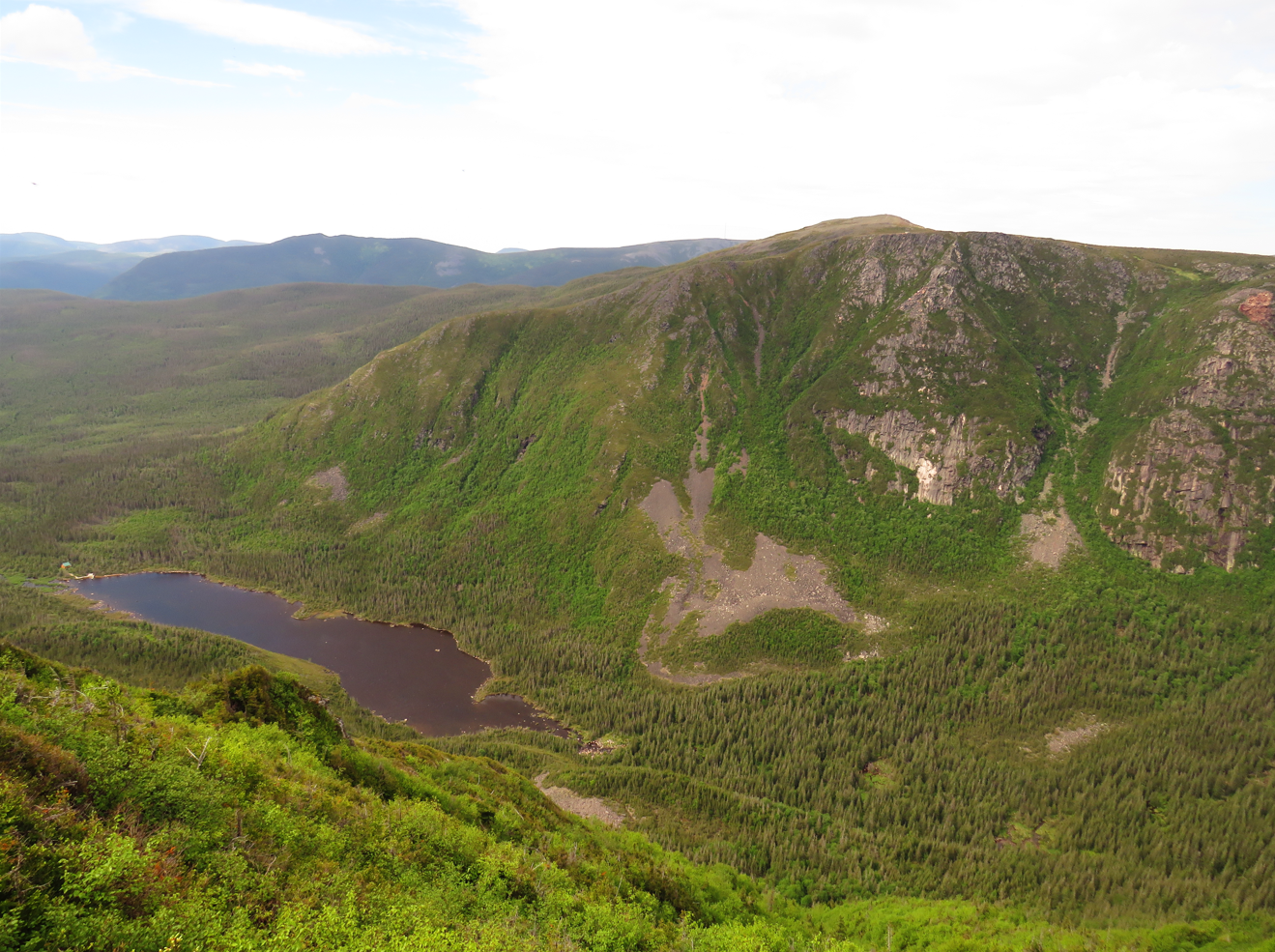
View from Mont Joseph-Fortin

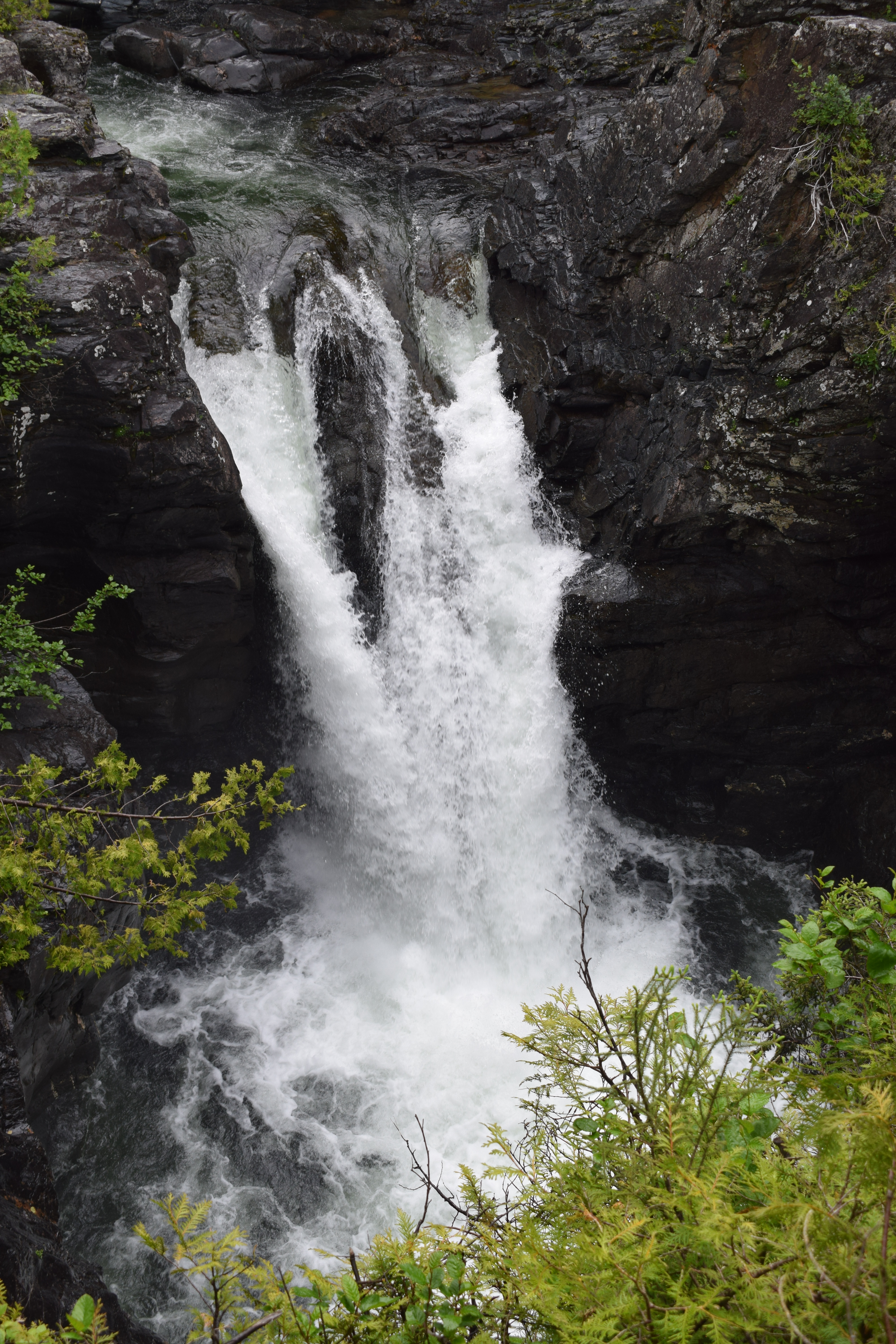
Sainte-Anne waterfall

== See also ==
- List of Quebec provincial & national parks
- National Parks of Canada
- List of National Parks of Canada
