= Sainte-Anne River (La Haute-Gaspésie) =

River in Gaspésie, in Quebec, Canada

Sainte-Anne River Old name: Rivière Sainte-Anne-des-Monts
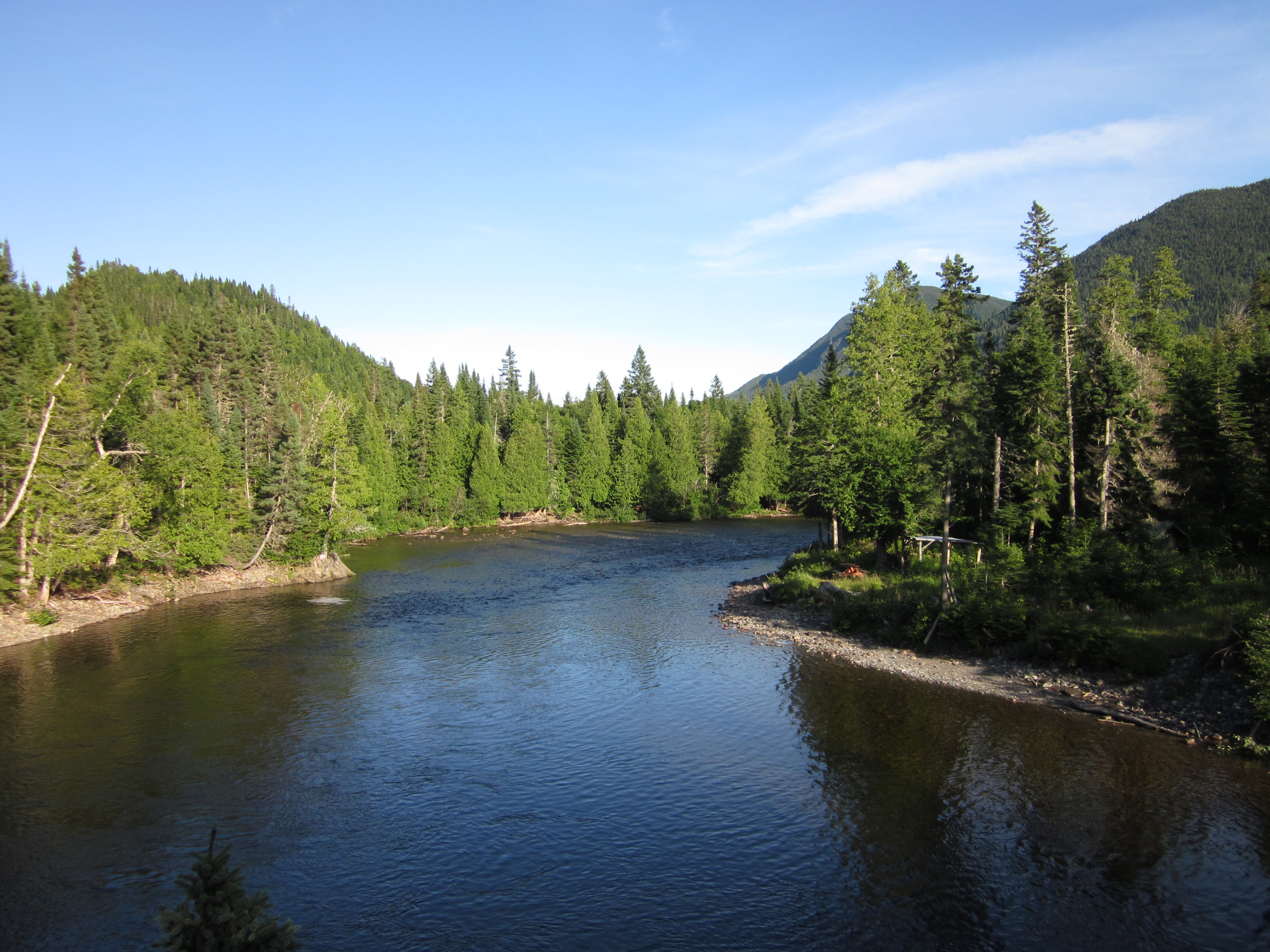
- Rivière Sainte-Anne dans le parc national de la Gaspésie

- Location within Quebec
- Native name: Rivière Sainte-Anne (French)

Location
- Country: Canada
- Province: Quebec
- Region: Gaspésie-Îles-de-la-Madeleine
- MRC: La Haute-Gaspésie Regional County Municipality

Physical characteristics
- Source: Lake Sainte-Anne
  - location: Mont-Albert
  - coordinates: 48.809323°N 66.07341°W
  - elevation: 414 metres (1,358 ft)
- Mouth: St. Lawrence River
  - location: Sainte-Anne-des-Monts
  - coordinates: 49.12583°N 66.50528°W
  - elevation: 2 metres (6 ft 7 in)
- Length: 740 kilometres (460 mi)

Basin features
- Tributaries
  - left: (upstream) ruisseau de la Tannerie, ruisseau du Vieux Moulin, ruisseau Louis-Amable, ruisseau Tanguay, ruisseau à Patates, ruisseau Côté, ruisseau du Grand Rapide, ruisseau aux Bouleaux, ruisseau du Petit Volume, ruisseau du Grand Volume, ruisseau Martin, rivière de la Grande Fosse, ruisseau Grand Plaqué, ruisseau du Plaqué Malade, ruisseau du Mont-Albert, ruisseau du Diable, ruisseau Isabelle, ruisseau Hog's Back
  - right: (upstream) ruisseau du Lac-de-la-Marne, ruisseau Côté, ruisseau de la Fosse de la Roche, ruisseau Cap-Seize, décharge de Petit lac Roma, coulée de la Tourette, ruisseau le Petit Saut, ruisseau à la Martre, ruisseau aux Chevreuils, ruisseau Rousseau, ruisseau Blouin, décharge du lac Caribou, Sainte-Anne River North-East, ruisseau du Castor, ruisseau des Petits Lacs, ruisseau du Bois

The Sainte-Anne River (in French: rivière Sainte-Anne) is a tributary of the south coast of the St. Lawrence River running from Mont-Albert to Sainte-Anne-des-Monts in the La Haute-Gaspésie Regional County Municipality, in Quebec, in Canada.

== Presentation ==
Four species of fish frequent the Sainte-Anne River. In addition to Atlantic salmon, we find brook trout, rainbow trout and American eel.

== Geography ==
The Sainte-Anne River has its source in Lac Sainte-Anne (length: 5.8 kilometres (3.6 mi); altitude: 385 metres (1,263 ft)) which is located in the Lemieux township, in the Notre Dame Mountains, on the northern slope of the watershed with the Petite rivière Cascapédia Ouest which flows south. This last valley is the southern extension of the Sainte-Anne river valley.

Lake Sainte-Anne is watered on the south side by Lake Mimault and on the east side by the Bois stream. Mount Lyall (elevation: 919 metres (3,015 ft)) dominates 2.7 kilometres (1.7 mi) on the west side with steep cliffs facing the lake. While the Pic Sterling of Mont Vallières de Saint-Réal culminates at 907 metres (2,976 ft) at 2.5 kilometres (1.6 mi) on the northeast side of the lake. The Chic-Chocs Wildlife Reserve is located on the east side of the lake.

The mouth of the lake is located 46.9 kilometres (29.1 mi) south of the southern coast of the estuary of Saint Lawrence and 71.9 kilometres (44.7 mi) north of Baie des Chaleurs.

The Sainte-Anne River flows north through Gaspésie National Park. In its course to the north, the Sainte-Anne river crosses the townships of Lemieux, Lesseps, La Potardière, Courcelette and Cap-Chat. At the end of the course, the river crosses the municipality of Sainte-Anne-des-Monts to the north.

From the mouth of Lac Sainte-Anne, the Rivière Sainte-Anne flows over 74.0 kilometres (46.0 mi).

The Sainte-Anne River flows on the southern coast of the Gulf of St. Lawrence in the heart of the village of Sainte-Anne-des-Monts in the cove of Sainte-Anne-des-Monts. This confluence is located 1.3 kilometres (0.81 mi) from the eastern limit of the township of Cap-Chat and at 1.6 kilometres (0.99 mi) east of the intersection of route 132 and the Bellevue road.

== Toponymy ==
The toponym "rivière Sainte-Anne" was made official on 5 December 1968 at the Commission de toponymie du Québec.

== See also ==
- Chic-Choc Mountains
