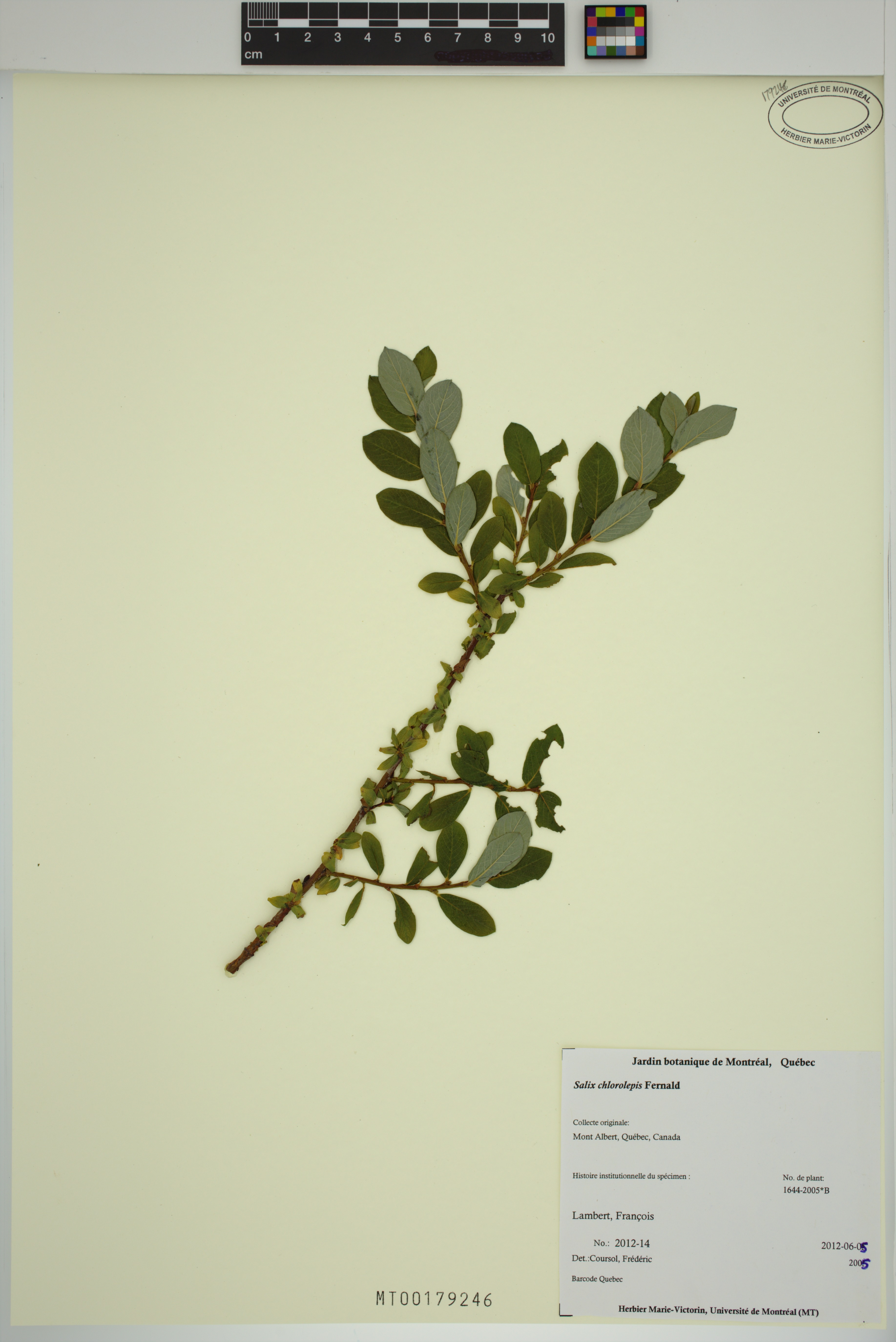

Scientific classification
- Kingdom: Plantae
- Clade: Tracheophytes
- Clade: Angiosperms
- Clade: Eudicots
- Clade: Rosids
- Order: Malpighiales
- Family: Salicaceae
- Genus: Salix
- Species: S. chlorolepis

Binomial name
- Salix chlorolepis Fernald

= Salix chlorolepis =

Species of plant

Salix chlorolepis, also known as the green-scaled willow, is a species of willow. It is endemic to Mount Albert and its surroundings in Quebec, Canada. It is listed as critically imperiled by NatureServe.
