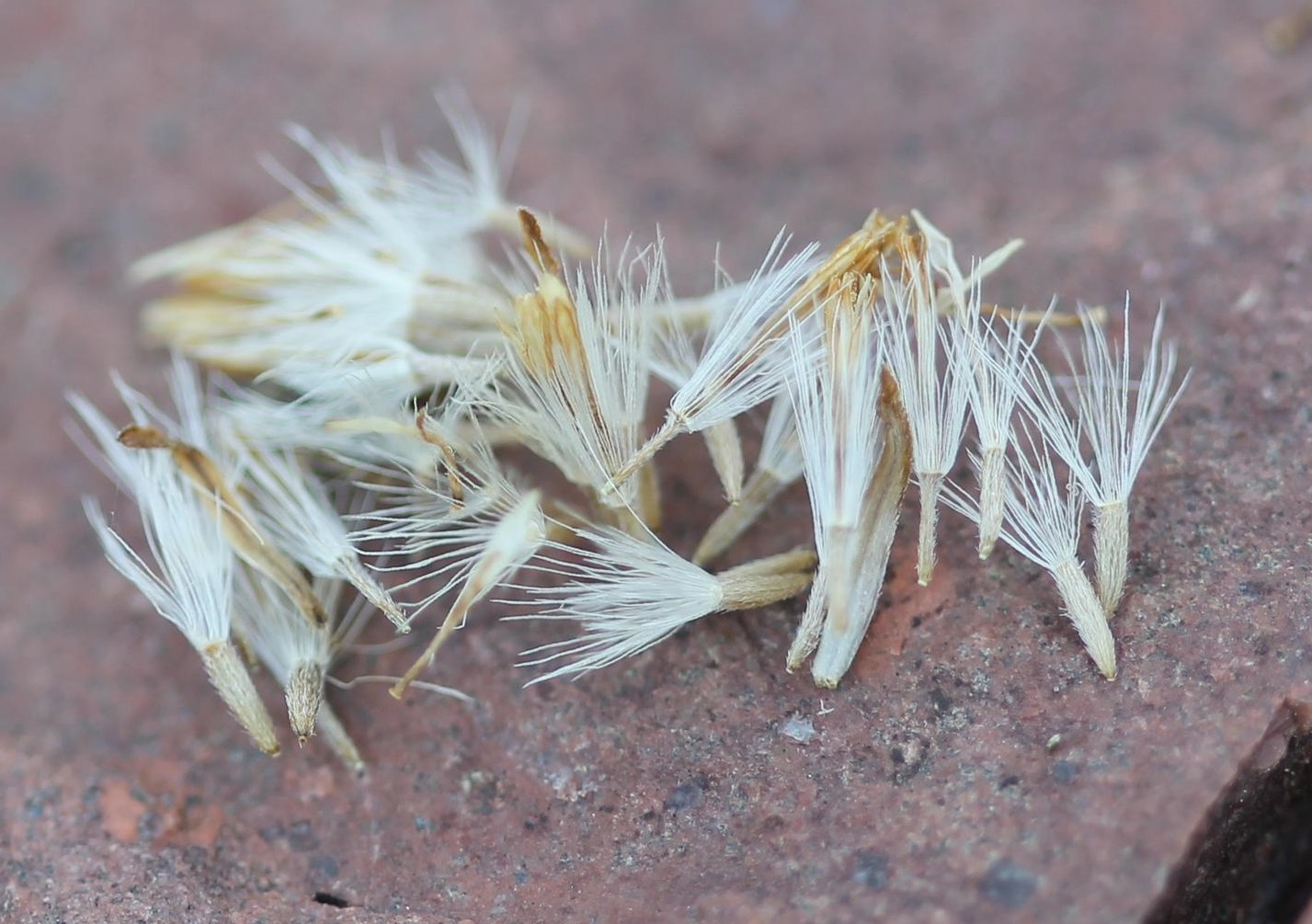
- Achenes with barbs
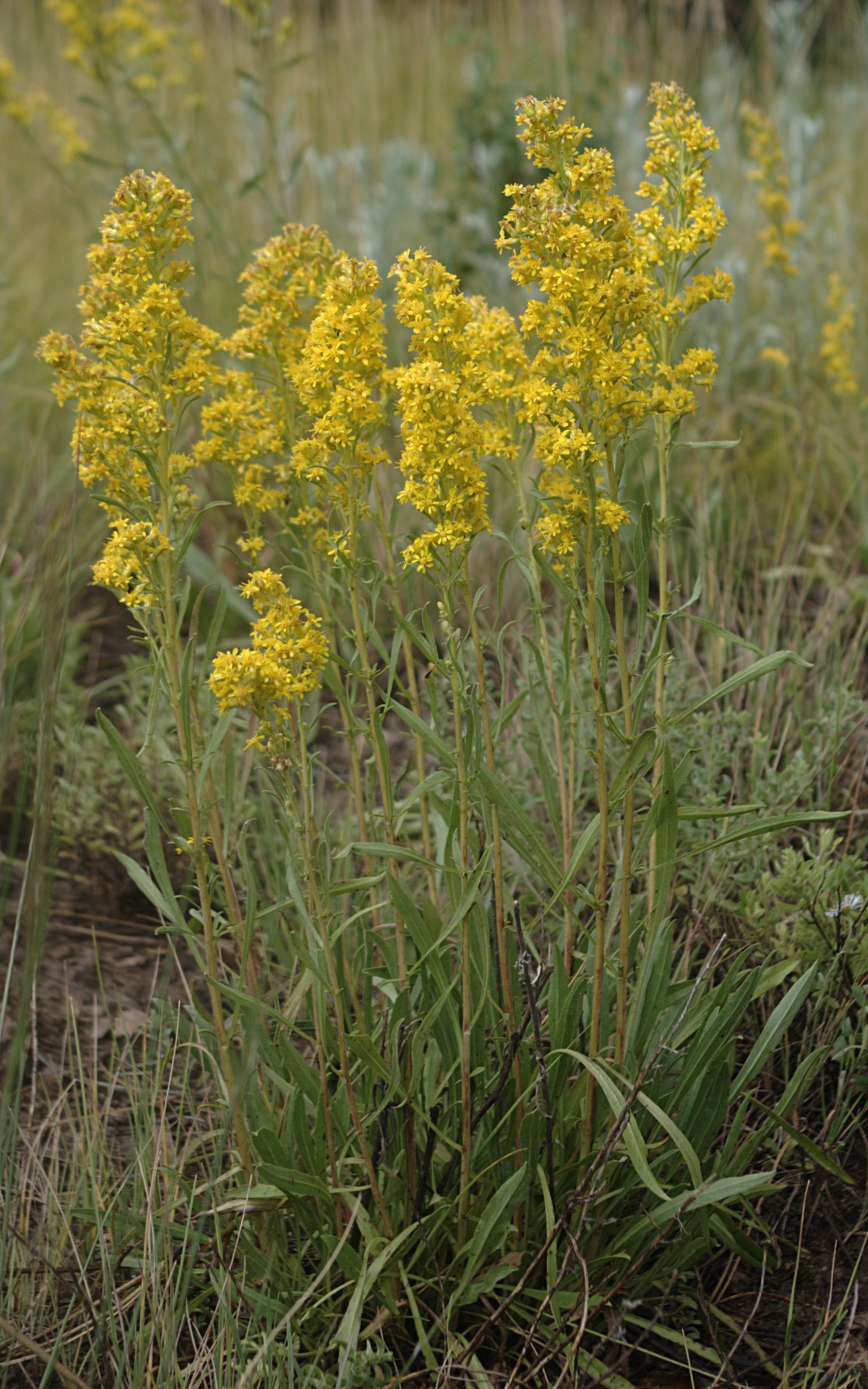
- Bandelier National Monument, New Mexico

Conservation status
- Secure (NatureServe)

Scientific classification
- Kingdom: Plantae
- Clade: Embryophytes
- Clade: Tracheophytes
- Clade: Spermatophytes
- Clade: Angiosperms
- Clade: Eudicots
- Clade: Asterids
- Order: Asterales
- Family: Asteraceae
- Genus: Solidago
- Species: S. simplex

Binomial name
- Solidago simplex Kunth 1818

Synonyms
- Synonymy: Solidago decumbens Greene; Solidago glutinosa Nutt.; Solidago neomexicana (A.Gray) Wooton & Standl.; Solidago oreophila Rydb.; Solidago chlorolepis Fernald, syn of var. chlorolepis; Solidago deamii Fernald, syn of var. gillmanii; Solidago gillmanii (A.Gray) E.S.Steele, syn of var. gillmanii; Solidago bellidifolia Greene, syn of var. nana; Solidago hesperia Howell, syn of var. nana; Solidago anticostensis Fernald, syn of var. racemosa; Solidago racemosa Greene, syn of var. racemosa; Solidago victorinii Fernald, syn of var. racemosa; Solidago randii (Porter) Britton, syn of var. randii

= Solidago simplex =

Species of flowering plant

Solidago simplex, the Mt. Albert goldenrod or sticky goldenrod, is a North American plant species in the genus Solidago of the family Asteraceae. It is widespread across much of Canada, parts of the United States, and northeastern Mexico.

== Description ==
Solidago simplex is a perennial herb up to 80 cm (32 inches) tall, with a branching underground caudex. One plant system can produce as many as 10 stems. Leaves are long and narrow, up to 16 cm (6.6 inches) long, produced on the stem as well as at the base. One stem can sometimes produce as many as 150 small yellow flower heads, each with 7-16 ray florets surrounding 6-31 disc florets.

== Varieties ==
At least eight varieties of the species may be recognised:

- Solidago simplex var. chlorolepis (Fernald) G. S. Ringius - Mt. Albert, Gaspé Peninsula, Québec
- Solidago simplex var. gillmanii (A.Gray) G.S.Ringius - shores of Lake Michigan + Lake Huron
- Solidago simplex var. monticola (Porter) G.S.Ringius - mountains in Québec, New York State, New England
- Solidago simplex var. nana (A.Gray) G.S.Ringius - Cascade Mountains in Oregon and Washington, Vancouver Island in British Columbia
- Solidago simplex var. ontarioensis (G.S.Ringius) G.S.Ringius - shores on Canadian side of Lake Huron
- Solidago simplex var. racemosa (Greene) G.S.Ringius - from Québec and New Brunswick south as far as West Virginia
- Solidago simplex var. randii (Porter) Kartesz & Gandhi - from Québec and New Brunswick west as far as Minnesota
- Solidago simplex var. simplex - from Alaska east to Northwest Territories + Quebec, south as far as Arizona, Nuevo León, San Luis Potosí
