= Chic-Chocs Wildlife Reserve =

Canadian wildlife refuge in Quebec

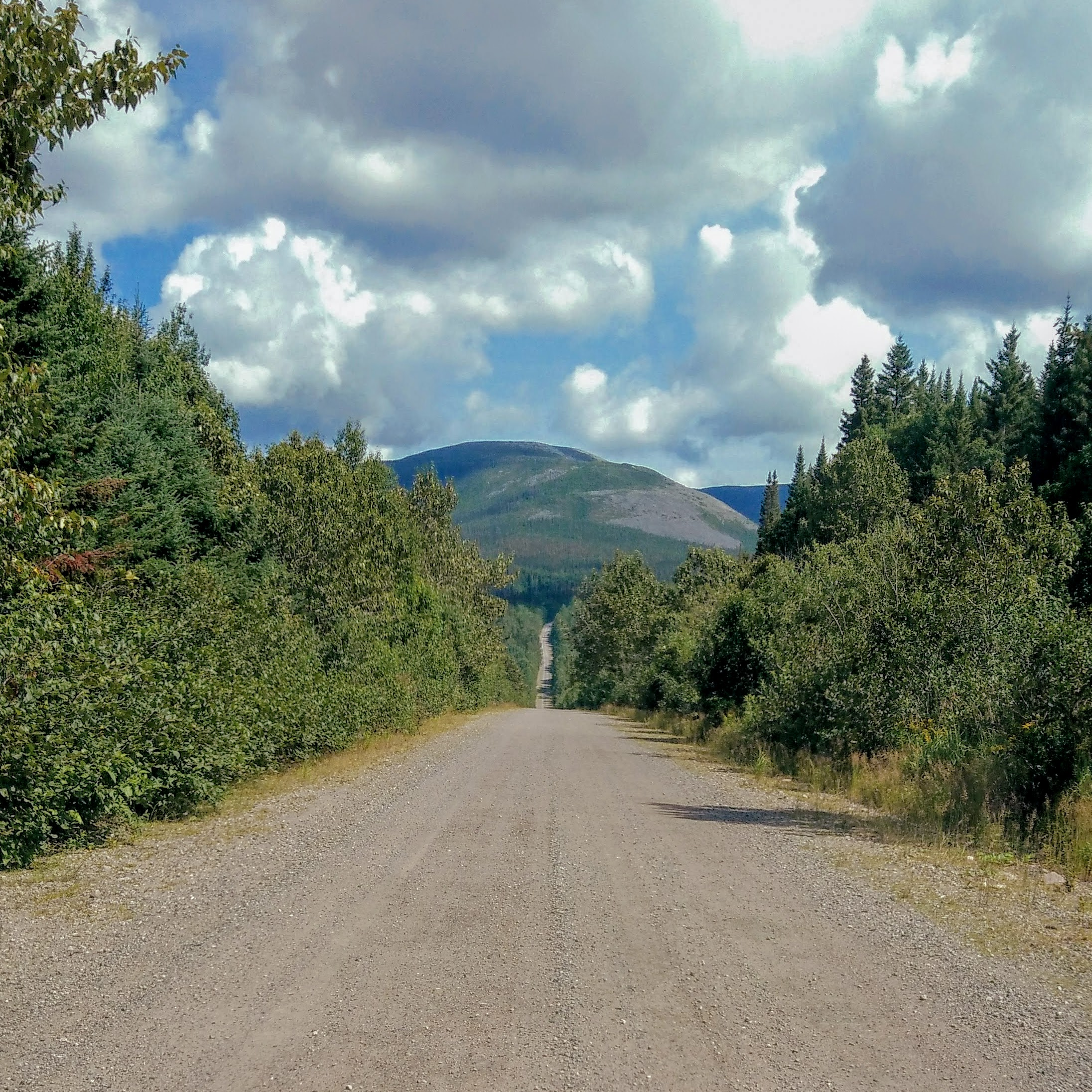
- Route 14 in the Chic-Chocs wildlife reserve

- Location within Quebec
- Location: Gaspésie National Park in Quebec, Canada
- Coordinates: 48°56′15″N 65°49′48″W
- Area: 1,129.71 km^{2} (436.18 sq mi)
- Created: 1949
- Administrator: Sépaq
- Website: www.sepaq.com/rf/chc/fr

The Réserve faunique des Chic-Chocs is a wildlife reserve of Quebec located in east of Parc national de la Gaspésie, in the administrative region of Gaspésie–Îles-de-la-Madeleine, in Quebec, Canada.

== Location ==
The Réserve faunique des Chic-Chocs is a wildlife reserve of Quebec located in the region of Gaspésie–Îles-de-la-Madeleine on the backbone of the Appalachian chain of Chic-Chocs, specifically in the regional county municipality of Haute-Gaspésie. Parc national de la Gaspésie borders the reserve to the west and the free territory borders the reserve to the east where part of the reserve is inside the park. This geographical location, on the outskirts of a protected territory where only the Gaspé Peninsula is not subject to the exploitation of natural resources (e.g. forest and wildlife) is cataloged one of the main tourist regions of Quebec. To get there, you have to take route 299 from Mont-Saint-Pierre and Sainte-Anne-des-Monts. Another option is to take route 198 via L’Anse-Pleureuse.

== Description ==
The Chic-Chocs wildlife reserve is part of the network of wildlife reserve of Quebec which covers a territory of 67,000 kilometres (41,631.87 mi). This reserve was created in 1949, becoming the seventh oldest reserve in the province. It covers an area of 1,129.71 kilometres (701.97 mi) which is divided into two distinct territories of 82.42 and 1,047.29 kilometres (650.76 mi), respectively. It is managed by the Société des établissements de plein air du Québec (Sépaq). The creation of this reserve was intended to create a buffer zone in Gaspésie Park, while preserving an exceptional territory for wildlife and allowing better use of the territory. In other words, the preservation of wildlife habitats and natural landscapes in a perspective of integrated resource management.

=== Climate ===
Between 1981 and 2010, the Sainte-Anne-Des-Monts health resort, located 54.8 kilometres (34.1 mi) from the reserve, reported a maximum daily temperature of 20.7 °C (69.3 °F) in the month of July. The lowest daily minimum temperature was reported in February (−15.8 °C [3.6 °F]). In this period of years, the month with the highest value of precipitation was that of July (92.2 millimetres [3.63 in]). On the other hand, the snowfall varies from 3.7 to 5.0 metres (12.1 to 16.4 ft) per year and the accumulation can reach 1.0 to 1.6 metres (3 ft 3 in to 5 ft 3 in) in the area. southern part and double in the north.

=== Topography and hydrology ===
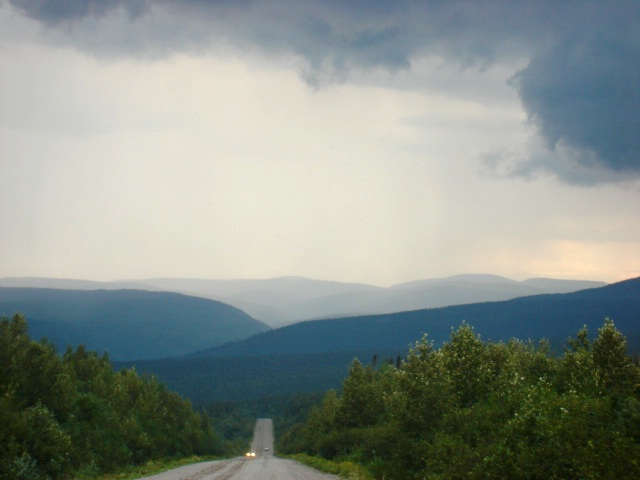
Monts Chics-Chocs, Gaspésie, Québec

The territory is characterized by the Chic-Choc and McGerrigle mountain ranges. In this massif, about 1,270 metres (4,170 ft) of altitude, are the Mont Jacques-Cartier which is the second highest summit of Quebec and the Hog's Back mountains (807 metres [2,648 ft]), Brown (855 metres [2,805 ft]), Vallières-de-Saint-Réal (914 m [2,999 ft]) and Blanche-Lamontagne (930 metres [3,050 ft]) of altitude. The different altitudinal gradients, in addition to creating various microclimates which favor an exceptional diversity of species, form the most important hydrographic basins of the territory (the rivers Madeleine, Mont-Louis, Sainte-Anne, Mont-St-Pierre, Marsoui, small Cascapedia and Bonaventure rivers). These basins are very branched by virtue of streams which form more than 1,388 km (862 mi) linear. This wealth of water resources is also made up of 42 lakes, which represents 1% of the extent of the reserve (approximately 9.91 km^{2} [3.83 sq mi]). In terms of biodiversity, these formations shape landscapes characterized by tundra on the tops of high mountains with vegetation that constitutes the habitat of a herd of wood caribou, the last representatives of this species south of the St. Lawrence River. The Chic-Chocs wildlife reserve is part of the ecological domains of the balsam fir to white birch and balsam fir to black spruce.

=== Forest cover ===
In the Chic-Chocs wildlife reserve, there are three bioclimatic domains, two of which are in the north of the reserve and the tundra on the highest peaks. A bioclimatic domain is a territory characterized by the nature of the vegetation where the balance between it and the climate is the main criterion for distinguishing between. domains.

==== Fir forest with black spruce ====
The Fir stand with black spruce is a forest cover characterized by old coniferous stands (fir stand), where the height growth of conifers is limited by the harsh climatic conditions that influence the Chic-Chocs mountain range. The trees have a reduced size (less than 12 m [39 ft]) and signs of damage which are characterized by the position of the branches on one side only, by a digging and a sinuous trunk and multiple heads, including several dead.

==== Fir forest to white birch ====
To the northeast, the fir-white birch stand forms a forest landscape, characterized by stands of fir and white spruce, mixed with white birch at mesic sites. Forest dynamics in this area are encouraged by spruce budworm, as balsam fir is abundant there.

==== Tundra of the High Peaks ====
The tundra, which extends over the highest peaks, outlines a landscape identified by a mosaic of shrubby moors interspersed with forests. This landscape is generated by the northern climate and fires, marked by the discontinuous permafrost of the area. Black spruce stands, about three meters high, are found at the northern limit of this area.

== Biodiversity ==
The reserve has a wide variety of bird species. The Ruffed Grouse (Bonasa umbellus) is an important species, as it is the target of many hunters. There are several species of songbirds and migratory birds that also call for public attention. Regarding terrestrial fauna, the species that are of importance to hunters are moose, black bear, porcupine (Erethizon dorsatum), Snowshoe hare (Lepus americanus). The aquatic species that predominate in the reserve's yards are brook trout (speckled trout) and lake trout (lake trout). Below is the description of the status of the most important species in terms of hunting in the reserve.

=== Aquatic fauna ===
==== Brook trout (speckled trout) ====
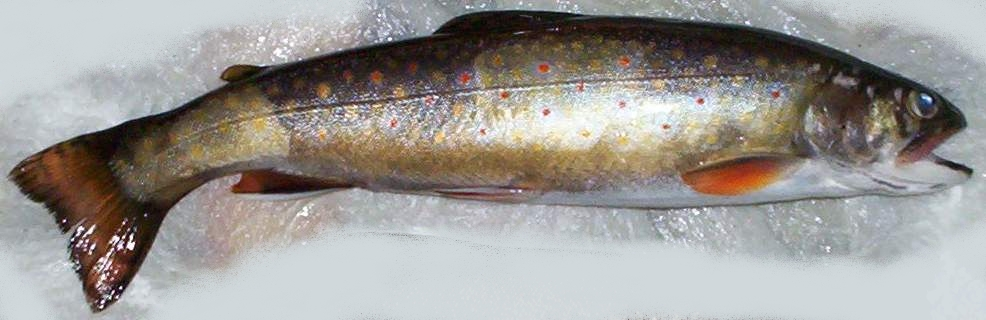
Speckled trout (Salvelinus fontinalis)

Brook trout (Salvelinus fontinalis), better known as speckled trout in Quebec, lives in all the lakes of the reserve, because these water systems are characterized by be clear and fresh (13 at 18 °C [64 °F]). Even though in southern Quebec this species has disappeared in several rivers, its abundance in the reserve has made this trout the target of people passionate about sport fishing. Statistics for the fishing season for 2015, for example, show a total of about 7551 catches. These figures prove that fishing is one of the engines of the economy in the region and these types of tourist activities are essential to acquire the necessary income to support the activities of the network of the society of outdoor establishments of Quebec (SEPAQ). In this sense, the University of Quebec carried out a study of the impacts of forest harvesting on the physicochemistry and the hydrological regime of the alkaline lakes of the reserve, because these forestry activities could increase the ph of watercourses at the watershed scale. This by producing perverse effects on the abundance of these species and it would be economically harmful. The result of this study demonstrated that no significant change in physicochemical parameters was recorded in the waters of the treated lakes. However, in order to avoid this phenomenon in the future, the development and integrated management plan of the reserve includes the characterization of aquatic habitats and a component on the harmonization of wildlife exploitation with forestry.

==== Touladi (lake trout) ====
The gray trout (Salvelinus namaycush) lives in cold (10 °C [50 °F]), clear and well oxygenated waters of the lakes of the reserve, in particular, in shallow lakes and rivers, occasionally in brackish water. This species feeds on either cisco, lake whitefish, smelt, suckers and sculpins, but in some courts. water plankton, crustaceans and insects are its food source by affecting the speed of its growth. Statistics for 2015 show that this species is only found in the Sainte-Anne of the reserve and that is why its abundance is minor. The figures show the capture of only 44 individuals during the fishing season of the year 2015.

=== Terrestrial fauna ===
==== Moose ====
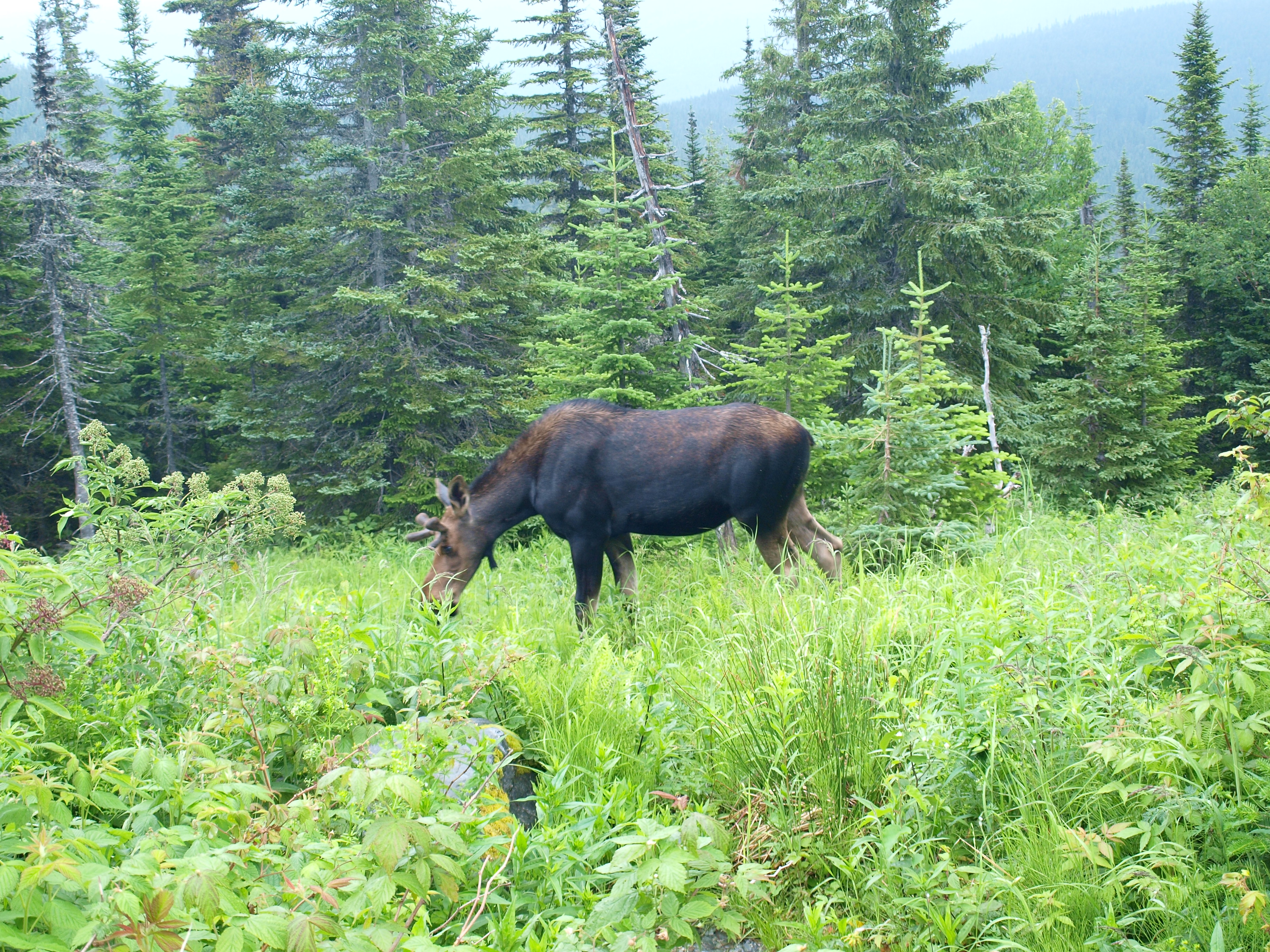
Moose female on Mont Ernest-Laforce

The forest ecosystems of the reserve are the habitat of the species moose. The conservation status of this species is Least Concern (LC), according to the International Union for Conservation of Nature (IUCN), which is why hunting of this species is still permitted in the province. In 2010, the Department of Expertise (Energy, Wildlife, Forests) of Gaspésie-Îles-de-la-Madeleine of the Ministry of Natural Resources and Wildlife (MRNF) made an aerial inventory of this species in the Reserve. This was done in order to know the density of moose in the territory and to estimate the productivity of this population in winter. The results of this inventory estimate that in the reserve there is a population of 1236 animals, that is to say a population equivalent to the estimated population (1,258) in the inventory made in winter 2002. In terms of density, there are 11.1 moose for 10 square kilometres (3.9 sq mi).

Regarding the moose harvest, this inventory reports a 274% increase in pressure from hunting groups in the period 2002 and 2009. The composition of the population is also an important factor in the sustainable management of the reserve. In 2009, the moose harvest included 129 males adults, 96 females adults and eight calves. According to experts, these figures suggest low productivity associated with the carrying capacity of the environment and a high natural mortality rate. This observation led managers to take two measures. The first is that of reducing the number of females allowed for harvesting. The second is the implementation of research work on the productivity of the habitat in relation to the density of moose on the territory of the wildlife reserve to define in the medium term the support capacity of the environment and to orient the objectives management of this moose population. One of the first measures was to reduce the hunting of females. In fact, the hunting statistics of this species, in the season of the year 2015, show that the ratio of female individuals to males is lower than in 2009. These statistics are reported according to the type of hunting plan (American or European). For the foreground, seven males and two females were slaughtered, while for the second 120 males, 55 females and 11 calves were.

On the other hand, a range of management strategies for wildlife habitats have been implemented since 2004. This in order to contribute positively to the increase in the moose herd based on past experiences that have reached this goal. For habitat management the original activities such as logging are necessary, but ensuring a balance between treated areas and residual forest. In general, wildlife requires a variety of habitats formed by different forest strata during all seasons of the year, and these types of activities encourage the formation of these forest canopies.

==== Black bear ====
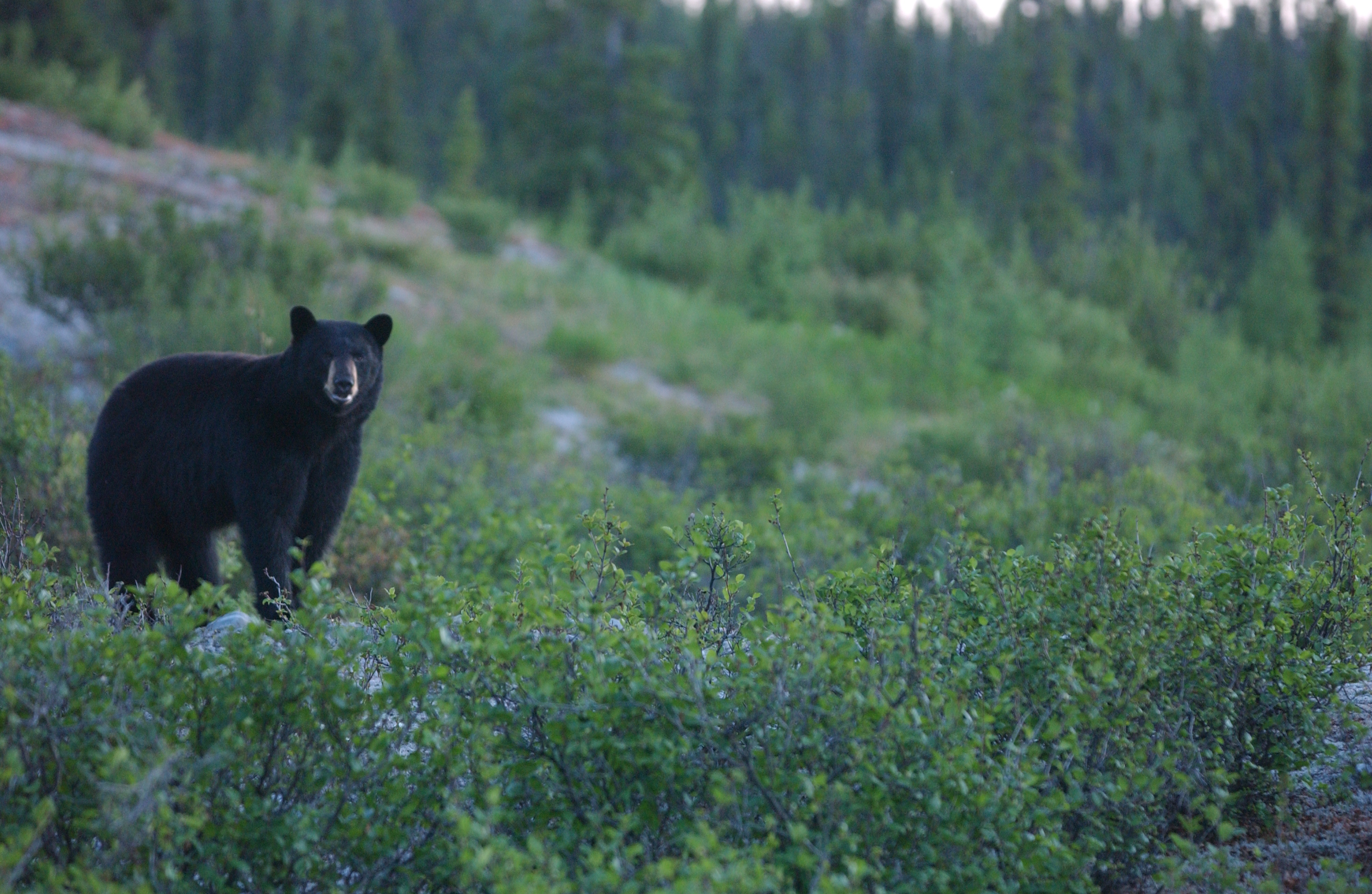
Ours noir (Ursus americanus)

The various ecological subdomains of the reserve are also habitat for black bear (Ursus americanus), as well as caribou. Between the 1970s and 1980s, bears were not considered a direct threat to caribou populations. However, human activities such as mining, logging and fires have fragmented habitats making the black bear the main predator of caribou. This finding is one of the main factors in the decline of the population in the reserve, which is why from 1992, black bear hunting was introduced in the territories adjacent to the Gaspésie National Park, as well as "a forest management plan to protect the habitats on the periphery of the park. The conservation status of this species according to the International Union for Conservation of Nature is "Least Concern (LC)". However, to avoid overexploitation of this species, there is a limit on the amount of bears allowed per hunter. For example, it will be possible to hunt two bears per hunter during the winter season of the year 2017.

==== Caribou ====
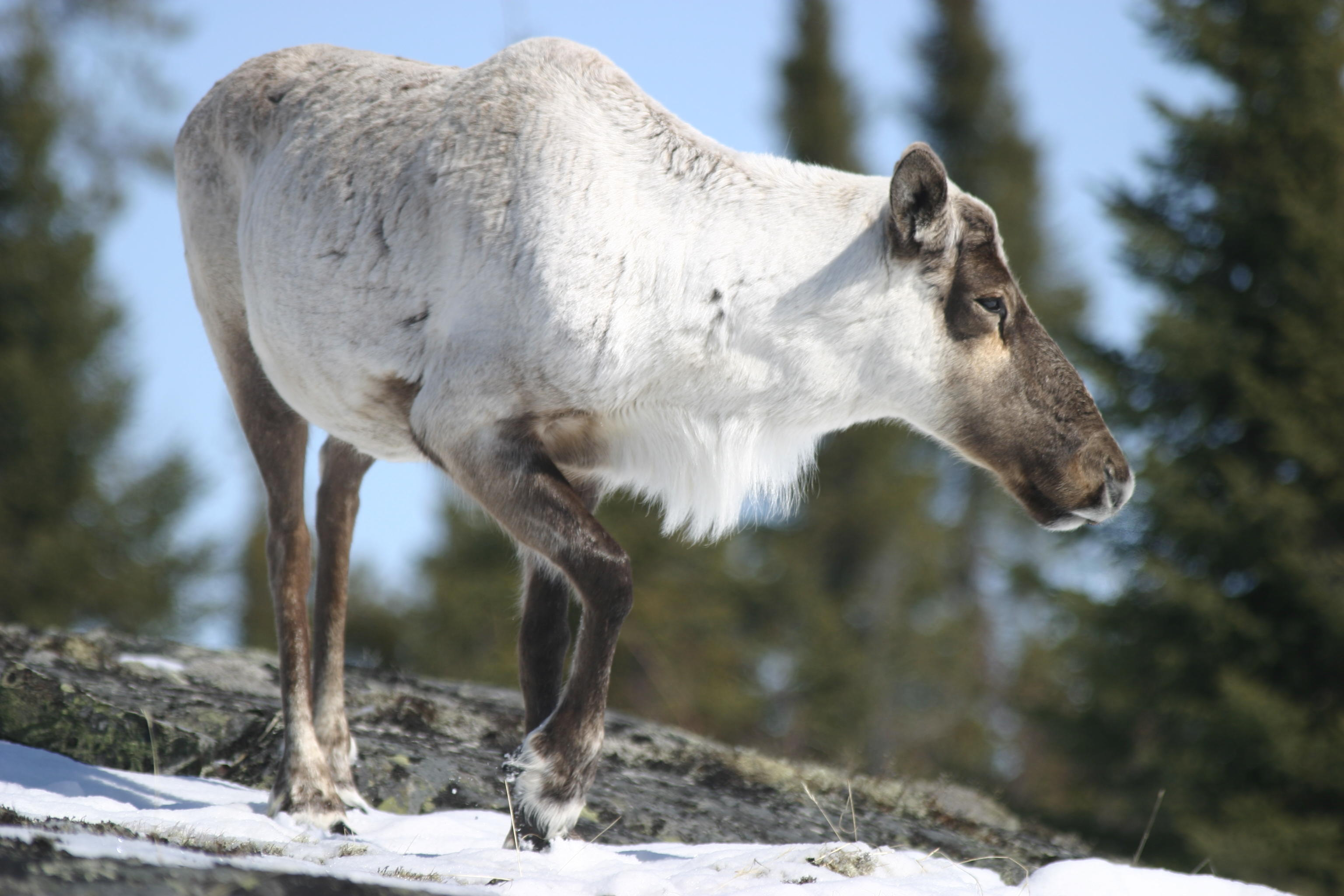
Caribou (Rangifer tarandus) in northern Quebec

According to the IUCN, the conservation status of the woodland caribou (Rangifer tarandus) is "Vulnerable (VU)"; however, the Committee on status of endangered species in Canada (COSEWIC) has designated this species "threatened". This caribou needs large continuous extensions of wooded areas. These wooded areas must include various strata, namely mature coniferous forests, lichens, muskegs and peat bogs. The topography is also determining for the survival of this species, sectors of highlands or hills are also necessary. The region's economic dynamics have encouraged the construction of new roads, which has increased deforestation and the fragmentation of ecosystems. This destruction of ecosystems has made this species easy prey to predators such as the black bear (Ursus americanus), the lynx (Lynx canadensis) and the coyote (Canis latrans). In 2004, the Gaspé caribou occupied approximately 802 square kilometres (310 sq mi) in the Gaspésie national park and 290 square kilometres (110 sq mi) in the periphery, a large part in the Chic-Chocs wildlife reserve. In order to reduce the vulnerability of caribou to predation, the forestry ministry in 1992 promoted a series of measures which include:

- resumption of control of predators in the area of Mont Albert and the Mc Gerrigle mountains;
- the collection of coyotes by the personnel of the Société de la fauna et des parcs du Québec;
- black bear hunting in the neighboring territories of the Gaspé National Park, in particular, in the Chic-Chocs wildlife reserve.

== High Conservation Value Zones (ZHV) ==
According to the Forest Stewardship Council (FSC) the concept of High Conservation Values is seen as a tool to "identify and manage social and environmental values present in landscapes". These values are indicators to be observed in the certification of sustainable forest management. The FSC identifies six high conservation values., i.e. the diversity of species (HVC1), ecosystems and mosaics at the landscape scale (HVC 2), ecosystems and habitats (HVC 3), ecosystem services (HVC4), community needs (HCV 5), Cultural values Sites (HCV 6).

In this sense, SÉPAQ and the Quebec Wildlife Foundation with the support of the Ministry of Sustainable Development, Environment and the Fight against Climate Change (MDDELCC) has developed a project to integrate ecological and wildlife issues. and recreational. The main result of this work was the identification of ZHV for the reserve and above all the identification of conservation issues and the enhancement of the tourist vocation of the territory (See the map).

The ZHVs in the reserve are the Saint-Réal valley, Mont Saint-Pierre and Mont Sainte-Anne, as they have HCV number II and III. In particular, these places are the habitat of caribou, an endangered species, and other species, there are extensions of old forests, and the cultural value given by the recreational vocation of the zone.

== Tourism and leisure activities ==
The Gaspé region is a region of tourist vocation because of the variety of landscapes and ecosystems that host a variety of aquatic and terrestrial fauna. This biodiversity calls the attention of the population who practice hunting, fishing and the following leisure activities:

=== Ski ===
Mont Blanche-Lamontagne, located in the territory of the reserve, is a good place to practice Nordic skiing. The geomorphology of this mountain is characterized by a loop route of 16 kilometres (9.9 mi) and a drop of 650 metres (2,130 ft).

=== Snowshoeing ===
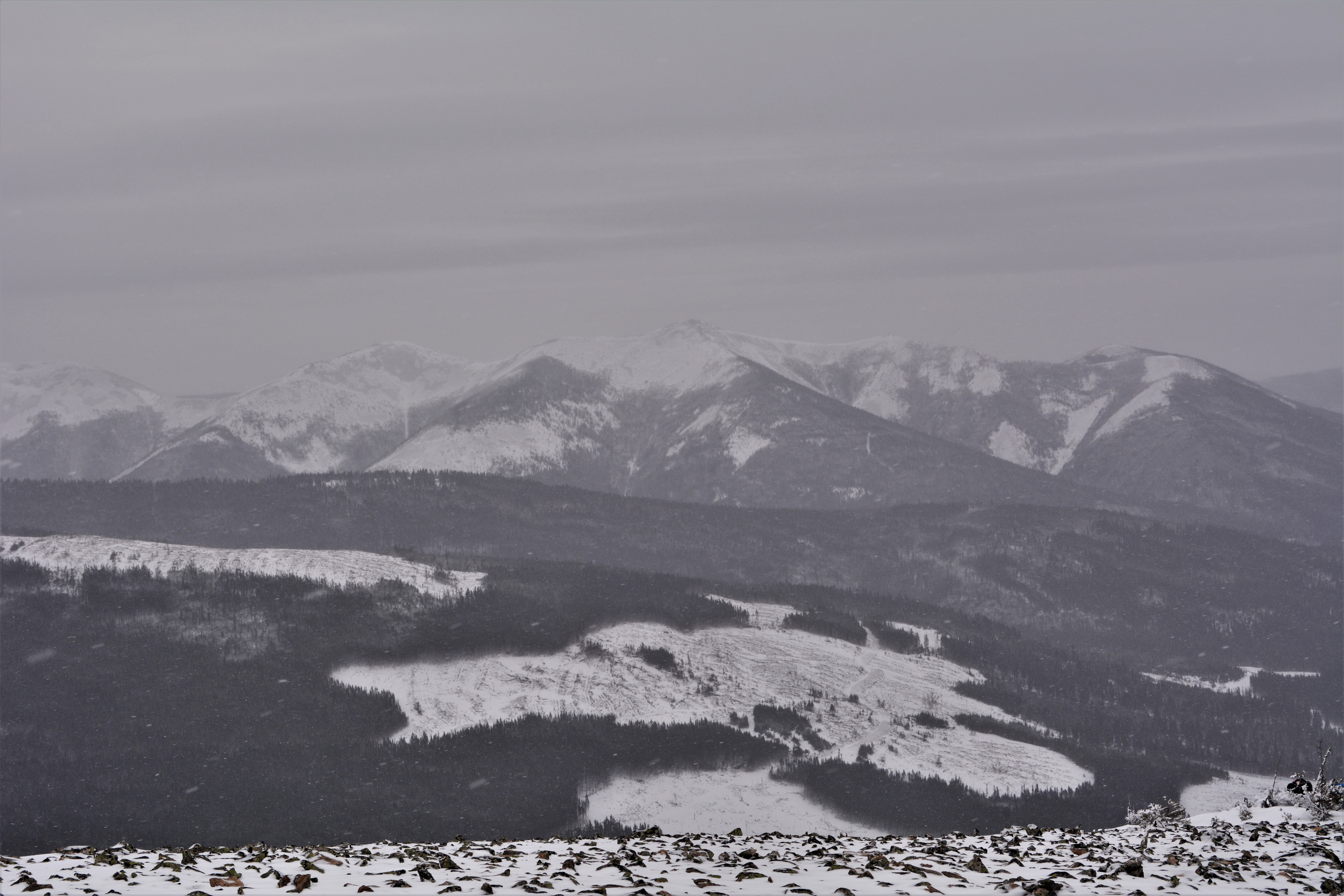
View from the Hog's Back mountain trail in winter

The mountains of the reserve present landscapes and trails suitable for hiking snowshoeing. Amateurs, as well as professionals in this activity can take advantage of the reserve, because there are several intermediate and difficult trails that take athletes to the top of Mount Hog's Back and Champ-de-Mars.

=== Hunting ===
Hunting in the Chic-Chocs wildlife reserve is a popular activity due to the variety of species that can be targeted by hunters in this portion of the territory. In general, a person interested in hunting must obtain a reservation and obtain a right of access which could be requested by the personnel responsible for the protection of wildlife or by a guardian of the territory. The hunter must respect the dates, time and place mentioned in the authorization and at the end of the hunting season, he must indicate his catches.

Small game hunting, or hare snaring in this reserve, can be done without necessarily being lodged in a chalet. A child under 18 years old must be accompanied by his parents. In the Chic-Chocs reserve, small game hunting with accommodation is also an option. This option gives visitors the chance to use a ATV on specially marked trails, as well as target migratory birds. The hunting season lasts ten days between the end of October and the beginning of November.

As previously mentioned, hunting of the original and black bear is also permitted. For the hunting of each species, you must have different hunting rights. In the case of moose, these rights are given by lot. Moose hunting is a popular activity in the reserve, as the density of this species is high, compared to that estimated in other reserves in the region. Moose hunting season generally begins in early September and ends in late October. As for black bear hunting, the hunting season lasts about fifteen days between May and June.

=== Other activities ===
Fishing is also an activity that encourages a visit to the reserve. The reserve offers day fishing, which those interested can make the reservation on site, specifically, at the administration office located at Mont-Saint-Pierre. Fishing with accommodation is another option for groups of people interested in spending several days in contact with lakes, namely lakes Adam, Mont-Louis, Madeleine, Sainte-Anne and Branche-Nord. For both plans, fishermen have a limit of ten individuals of brook trout and two of lake trout. The period for practicing this activity is between the end of May and the beginning of September.

Throughout the reserve, there are viewing towers where visitors will have the chance to observe bears or moose. On the other hand, visitors can indulge in the hiking. They can take a 4 kilometres (2.5 mi) route over the McGerrigle Mountains and Lac à Pierre. For people new to this practice, it is suggested to take the trail located 2 km (1.2 mi) from the Branche Lake - North chalet (49°00′25″N 65°50′53″W) on route 22 of the reserve.
