= Sydney Goldman =

British businessman and MP

Charles Sydney Goldman
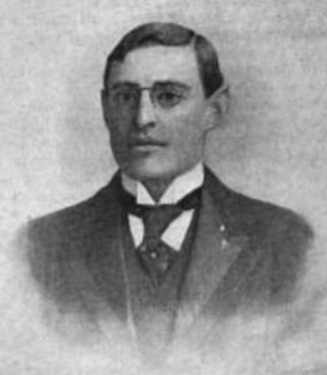
- In The Sketch, 8 January 1896
- Born: 28 April 1868; Cape Colony
- Died: 7 April 1958 (aged 89); British Columbia, Canada
- Resting place: Yaverland, Isle of Wight
- Other name: C.S. Goldman
- Occupations: Journalist, author, politician
- Known for: Nicola Ranch
- Political party: Unionist
- Spouse: Hon. Agnes Mary Peel
- Children: Hazel Goldman (1904–1946) John Monk Goldman (1908–1999) Victor Robert Penryn Monk Goldman (1910–1987)
- Parent(s): Bernard Nahum Goldmann and Augusta Goldmann née Friedlander

Major Charles Sydney Goldman FRGS (28 April 1868 – 7 April 1958) was a British businessman, author, and journalist who served as a Member of Parliament (MP) from 1910 until 1918.

== Background ==
In early life, he used the family name in the spelling Goldmann. Born in Cape Colony, he was of German Jewish ancestry. His father Bernard Nahum Goldmann had left eastern Germany after the German revolutions of 1848–1849, because of his political involvements. It was reported in 1939 that his family name was originally Monck.

Bernard Goldmann ran a shop at Burgersdorp for the Mosenthal brothers, and prospered; he was appointed Justice of the Peace for the Albert district of Cape Colony in 1869. He was a director of the Albert Bank, with his brother Louis Goldmann, who had arrived in Cape Town in 1845 with his family from Breslau, had gone into business with the Mosenthals and moved to Burgersdorp. The surgeon and medical researcher Edwin Goldmann was Sydney's elder brother.

In 1876 Bernard Goldmann and his family migrated to Europe, by a sea voyage on SS Nyanza to Southampton. After a period in London, they moved on to Breslau. As tutor in German, and to help with college preparation, the children had an uncle, Dr. Monck. The boys also attended the gymnasium school, where Adolf Anderssen taught. From there, Sydney and his brother Alfred moved back to South Africa; while Edwin and Richard, the other brothers, with their sister Alice, remained in Germany.

== In business ==
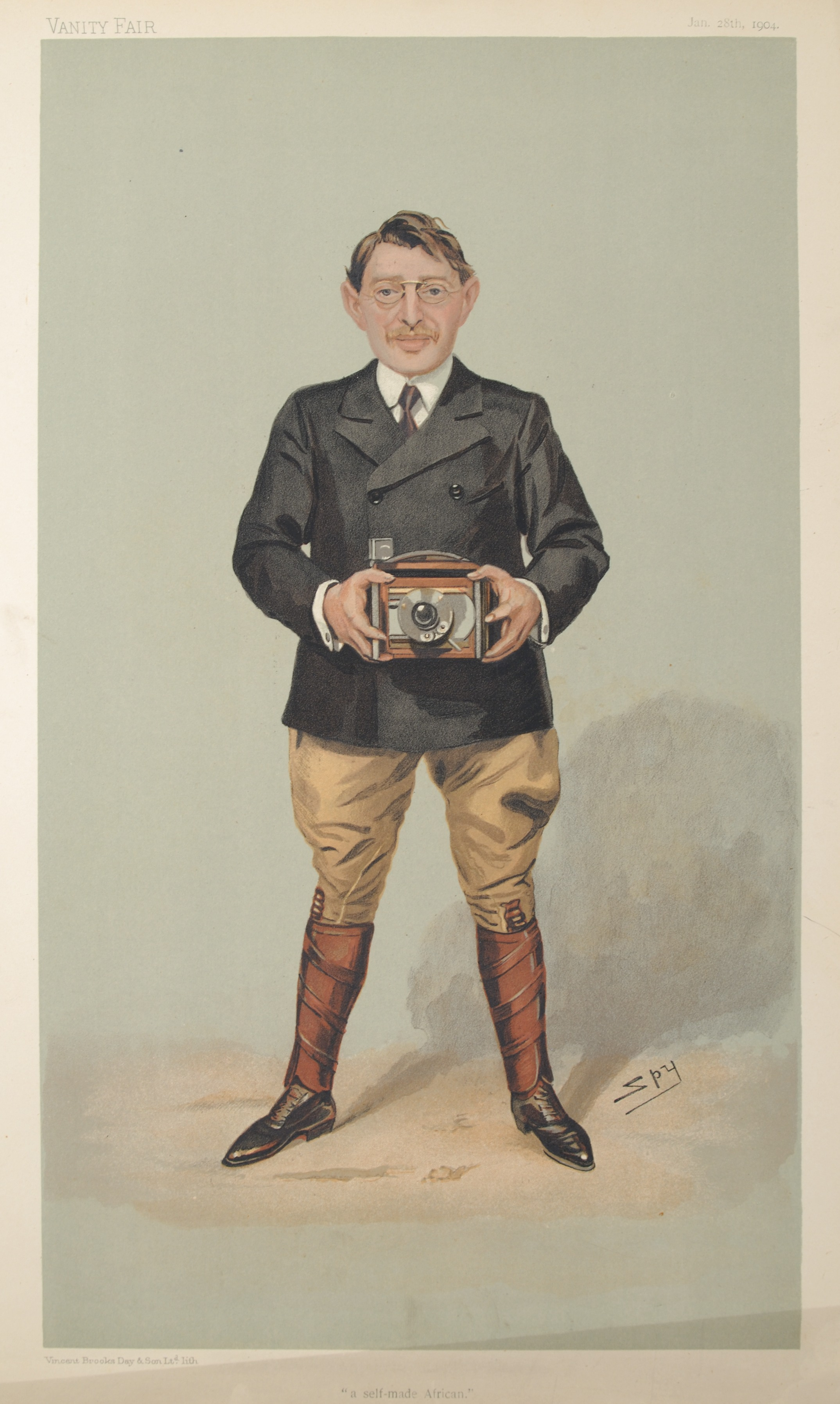
"A self-made African" as caricatured by Spy (Leslie Ward) in Vanity Fair, January 1904

Goldman and his elder brother Alfred returned to South Africa around 1882. Alfred settled at Graaff-Reinet as a dealer. Sydney Goldman went into agriculture. He was in business at Reddersburg, in the Orange Free State, around 1887.

Gold mines and their finance earned Goldman a fortune. He moved to the goldfields after the Witwatersrand Gold Rush, and was taken on by a mining company. He was elected a Fellow of the Royal Geographical Society in 1891, as Sydney Goldmann. From age 26, or 1895, he was a partner in S. Neumann & Co., Sigismund Neumann's holding company, at least to 1905; later (by 1913) Neumann was the sole partner. As the other partners moved to London, Goldman was for a time the only partner resident in Johannesburg.

Goldman purchased an extensive estate known as Schoongezicht (later known as Lanzerac) in the Middelburg district. By 1900 it was owned by John X. Merriman. Bernard Goldmann having died (by 1894), the family moved by stages to London, with Edwin remaining in Freiburg, Germany; and Sydney left Johannesburg. In 1899 in England he married a granddaughter of Sir Robert Peel.

== Boer War ==
During the Second Anglo-Boer War, Goldman was a war correspondent for The Standard and was a major in the British forces. Initially attached to Sir Redvers Buller's relief force, he travelled with them as far as Ladysmith after which he transferred to the cavalry advancing north in order to report on their endeavours. At this period, Goldman worked as a cameraman for the Warwick Trading Company, taking over when Joseph Rosenthal left in the middle of 1900. He is recorded as filming a ceremony on 25 October 1900 in Pretoria, in which Lord Roberts marked the annexation of the Transvaal. After that Goldman returned to Johannesburg, which had been captured by British forces.

== Imperialism and politics ==
In the 1890s Goldman was involved in the Eighty Club. His brother Richard dined there while Lord Rosebery, the Liberal Imperialist, was Prime Minister (i.e. 1894–5). Clinton Edward Dawkins described Goldman to Leo Maxse in 1904 as:

...full of S. African shares, also of public spirit and of imperial devotion...[who] desires to excel as a writer or pamphleteer. Nature—or his education—have deprived him of the least glimmering of literary skill.

Goldman joined the Compatriots Club formed that year. To gain influence, he purchased a struggling weekly journal, The Outlook, at the end of 1904. It had been founded by George Wyndham, and was then edited by Percy Hurd. In order to develop it as an organ of the tariff reformers, Goldman hired the journalist J. L. Garvin as its editor. Garvin quickly transformed the journal into a publication of note, but the paper failed to turn a profit. After a series of disagreements between the two men over business matters, Goldman sold the paper to Lord Iveagh in October 1906. On the tone of Edwardian period imperialist writers, contrasted with Leonard Woolf, Simon Glassock writes:

Garvin, Goldman and St Loe Strachey demonstrate how writers at the turn of the twentieth century might have allied economics, politics and history with appeals for the reader to take modest but deserved pride in the imperial achievements of the British.

Goldman joined the Carlton Club. He was a member of the Unionist Social Reform Committee, while his wife Agnes was on the Council of the Conservative and Unionist Women's Franchise Association. He resided at Walpole House which he sold in 1925. He involved himself in politics directly by entering Parliament, winning the Penryn and Falmouth seat in the January 1910 general election as a Unionist.

In 1913 Goldman was a captain in the Royal Garrison Artillery; and during World War I, served as a major in it, in Cornwall. As a backbencher he was noted, like Arnold Ward, for his "jingoistic" views. He remained an MP until the borough was abolished in 1918 (the name was transferred to a new county division).

== Later life ==
In 1919 Goldman purchased the Nicola Ranch and most of the Nicola townsite in the Nicola Country, British Columbia, which grew to some 300,000 acres (1,200 km^{2}). He owned all the way up to what is now the Monck Provincial Park, named after his son Commander Victor Robert Penryn Monck of the Royal Navy.

In England Goldman lived at Trefusis House, Falmouth until about 1929, after which he moved to the Jacobean mansion at Yaverland Manor.

== Works ==
Goldman wrote an eyewitness account of the Boer War, and edited and translated other works.

- The financial, statistical, and general history of the gold & other companies of Witwatersrand, South Africa (1892)
- South African Mines: Volume I (1895): Rand mining companies and two succeeding volumes, II on Miscellaneous Companies, and III on maps (1896)
- With General French and the Cavalry in South Africa (1902). The illustrations to the book included a number of photographs taken by Charles Howard Foulkes of the Royal Engineers, who used a Newman & Guardia 5x4 camera, published with permission.
- (as editor) The Empire and the century: A series of essays on imperial problems and possibilities (1905)
- (as translator) Cavalry in Future Wars (1906), from the German of Unsere Kavallerie im nächsten Kriege: Betrachtungen über ihre Verwendung, Organisation und Ausbildung (1899) by Friedrich von Bernhardi

In 1905 Goldman became the founding editor of The Cavalry Journal. From 1911 the editorship was an ex officio duty of the commandant of the Cavalry School at Netheravon.

=== Mapping ===
- Map of the Witwatersrand goldfield, compiled 1891 from government surveys by Ewan Currey and Brian Tucker, scale 1:29,779, published 1892.
- Atlas of the Witwatersrand and Other Goldfields in the South African Republic (1899), compiled under the direction of C. S. Goldmann, with Baron A. von Maltzan (Ago von Maltzan, in the later 1890s at university in Breslau).

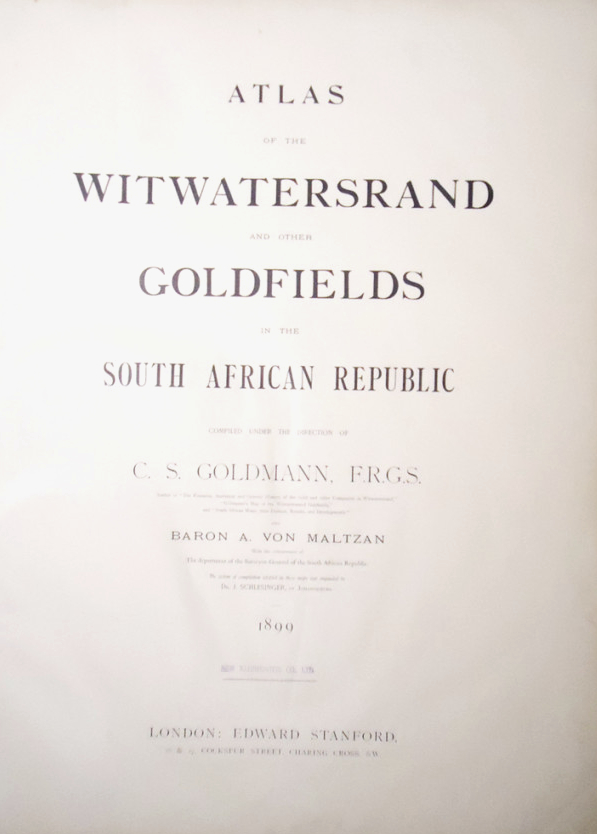
Atlas of the Witwatersrand and Other Goldfields in the South African Republic (1899), title page

== Legacy ==
Goldman was a collector of Pre-Raphaelite Brotherhood art. His pictures were divided between his two sons.

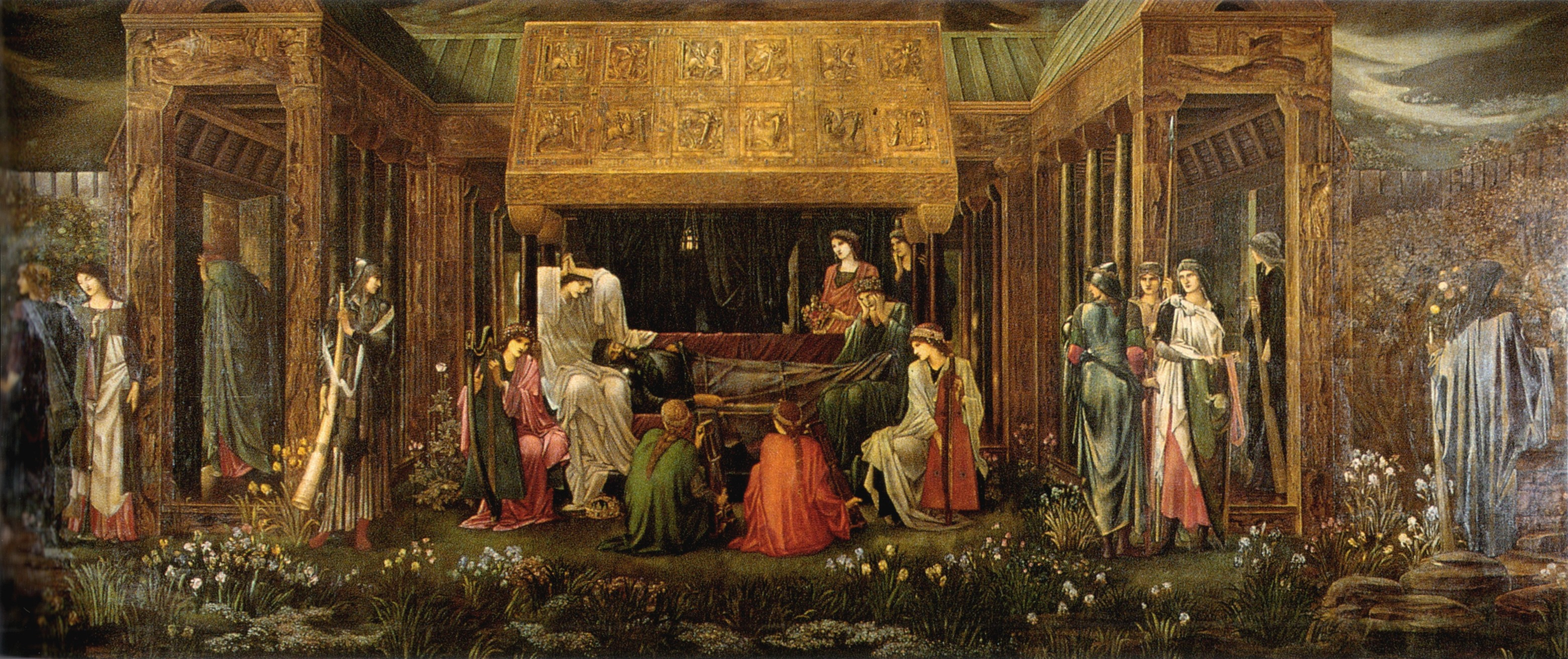
The Last Sleep of Arthur in Avalon by Edward Burne-Jones, bought by Sydney Goldman from Burne-Jones's executors, and after his death bought by Luis A. Ferré, now in the Museo de Arte de Ponce

One of Goldman's legacies is Monck Provincial Park on the shore of Nicola Lake, for which Goldman gave land in 1951. There was a memorial stone to Charles Sydney Goldman in the yard at the Murray United Church in the area. The church itself was burned down in 2019.

== Family ==
Goldman married, in 1899, the Hon. Agnes Mary Peel (1869–1959), daughter of Liberal Party politician Arthur Peel, 1st Viscount Peel. They had met when she visited the Rand, and the house "Amerden" Sydney shared there with his brother Richard. During the Boer War she worked as a nurse in the military hospital at Pietermaritzburg. She was decorated with the Royal Red Cross, and was in December 1901 appointed a Lady of Grace of the Venerable Order of Saint John of Jerusalem.

After Emily Hobhouse had written in The Contemporary Review about British concentration camps in South Africa, and in particular about the number of Africans remaining in them, John Smith Moffat replied in the same periodical. Two months after Moffat's article, Agnes Goldmann contributed a further article on the topic. Her views included the desirability of segregation for Africans of the Transvaal.

The Goldmans had three children. Of those, Victor Robert Penryn Monk Goldman changed his surname legally to Monck, and John Goldman Monk Goldman changed his name legally to John Monk Monck, in both cases on 22 February 1939. The name Monck was stated to be the original family name.

- John (1908–1999), the elder son, was born at Rottingdean. He became a film editor at Gainsborough Pictures in the 1920s, and after visiting the Soviet Union joined the Communist Party of Great Britain and was an organiser for the Association of Cinematograph Television and Allied Technicians. In 1934 he married Margaret Thesiger, daughter of the late Frederic Thesiger, 1st Viscount Chelmsford. That year his sister purchased the Mewstone in Plymouth Sound to give to him. Also that year he edited Man of Aran, directed by Robert J. Flaherty. During WWII he was a film producer for the Crown Film Unit, and after the war he worked on documentaries with Sergei Nolbandov. He also farmed.
- Victor (known as Pen Goldman) published as Penryn Goldman the 1932 travel book To Hell and Gone about Australia, introduction by Wilfred Grenfell. He was an RNVR officer, a temporary lieutenant on HMS Buxton in 1942, and as Lieutenant Commander sent to Hawaii to liaise with the US Navy in 1944 (reported by the International Grenfell Association magazine). In later life he was often known as Commander Penryn Monck. He married in 1949 (Isolde) Sheila Tower Butler, sister of Patrick Theobald Tower Butler, 18th Baron Dunboyne .
- Hazel, the daughter, carried the train of Una Duval, first cousin of her mother, at her 1912 "suffragist" wedding, the marriage vows omitting "to obey". At the time of her giving Mewstone to her brother John and wife Margaret in 1934 as a wedding present, she was living at Sydney Lodge, Hamble-le-Rice, designed by Sir John Soane. It was sold by her father in 1936.

The Goldmans also had as ward Lorna Goldman(n), daughter of Sydney's brother Edwin, after his death in 1913. She met and then married Stewart Gore-Browne in 1927, at age 19 and still at Sherborne School for Girls. Gore-Browne's biographer comments that "The Goldmans travelled incessantly, to the Continent and the Orient".

Parliament of the United Kingdom
Preceded by Sir John Barker	Member of Parliament for Penryn and Falmouth; January 1910 – 1918	Succeeded by Sir Edward Nicholl
