= Nicola, British Columbia =

Nicola
- Location of Nicola in British Columbia
- Coordinates: 50°09′59″N 120°40′04″W
- Country: Canada
- Province: British Columbia
- Region: Nicola Country
- Regional District: Thompson-Nicola
- Area codes: 250, 778, 236, & 672
- Highway: Highway 5A

Nicola is an unincorporated community in the Nicola region of south central British Columbia. The place is on the north side of the Nicola River at the southwestern end of Nicola Lake. On BC Highway 5A, the locality is by road about 11 kilometres (7 mi) northeast of Merritt, 77 kilometres (48 mi) southeast of Spences Bridge, and 90 kilometres (56 mi) southwest of Kamloops.

== Roads and trails ==
In 1871, Canford–Nicola–Quilchena was a trail, preferably taken with a guide. During 1876–77, the Spences Bridge–Nicola wagon road was built.

Around 1881, construction of the Kamloops–Nicola wagon road began. From 1893, the valley was connected with the outside by stage to Kamloops and Spences Bridge. Mail service was once a week.

By the 1920s, gravel highways existed to Spences Bridge and Kamloops.

The opening of the Coquihalla Highway in 1986 has increased traffic on Highway 5A.

== Earlier community ==
In 1867, Edwin Dalley, the first European settler, an architect from London, England, built his homestead at the foot of the lake. Within a couple of years, John Clapperton was the next to pre-empt. Clapperton was postmaster in 1874 or longer, but the post office predated that year.

In 1880, Albert Elgin Howse settled and was appointed Indian agent. In the early 1880s, he became a silent partner in the general store established by George Petit. Howse later opened stores in four other locations. In 1884, he bought out Petit. That year, he resigned as Indian agent following the killing of Harper's Billy, a First Nations member. In an assault that started within the general store, the beating continued outside. Although Howse was never charged, opinion was divided as to whether this constituted murder. In 1883, Howse completed building one of the finest residences in the Nicola Valley, which he lavishly furnished. That year, the Anglicans established a school. Howse was postmaster 1884–1892 and established a portable steam sawmill in 1887, which operated as the Dominion Steam Saw and Planing Mills.

Both built in 1890, Howse operated the Driard Hotel and the first roller flour mill in the valley, which traded as the Nicola Roller Flour Mills. In 1894, Howse, John Clapperton and Edwin Dalley combined their land to lay out the Nicola townsite. The survey comprised 765 building lots, which would take another decade before significant buyer interest emerged. The settlement was named after the river and lake.

Since the 1890s, townspeople and ranchers had lobbied for a railway link. By 1905, when railway construction was imminent, people eagerly awaited a passenger and freight service, which would bring in supplies and take out cattle to markets. Few appreciated that the primary reason for the railway was to facilitate the development of the extensive coalfields well to the southwest, which would ultimately diminish Nicola. That year, the Bank of Montreal opened a branch in a portion of the A.E. Howse dry goods store, and the Nicola Herald began publishing. By that time, the town had a telephone service and athletic association.

During the boom years of 1905–1907, additional stores opened to supplement the existing A.R. Carrington and A.E. Howse ones. However, Merritt soon became the new commercial centre. Apart from local farmers and ranchers, most Nicola residents and businesses left during 1907–1911. By 1910, the two-sheet Nicola Herald (published every Thursday) had become a broadsheet renamed The Merritt Herald and Nicola Valley Advocate (published on Fridays).

Stanley Kirby, who purchased the Driard House Hotel from A.E. Howse for $27,000 and renamed it the Nicola Hotel, was left bankrupt before World War I. The hotel closed in 1923. The war also depleted Nicola of adult males. One such volunteer reminisced of the Nicola Valley to Major C. S. Goldman, a British Army officer, who later became the largest single landowner in the valley. Soon, only a few old-time inhabitants remained in the township. Nicola became a place to periodically visit for a picnic or to watch a good horse race.

A.E. Howse maintained his residence until November 1919, when Major Goldman bought all his land. Later called the UT House (after the Goldman stock brand), the building is one of the oldest houses in the Nicola Valley. During the inter-war years, Goldman remained a visitor. Following World War II, he became a resident and acquired more ranches. In 1951, he donated approximately 60 hectares (149 acres) of land around Nicola Lake for public use, which became Monck Park. In 1954, fire destroyed the Nicola Ranch store and post office, an adjoining butcher shop, and the company offices. On his death in 1958, Goldman owned all but three of the properties in the Nicola townsite.

In 1960, the post office closed. In 1959, George Parker Sr., a Texas millionaire, purchased the Nicola properties. Subsequently, the township site fell into a state of disrepair and fire destroyed several buildings. In the late 1970s, the Nicola Ranch was sold.

== Earlier church life ==
Rev. George Murray, a Presbyterian minister, covered a 970-kilometre (600 mi) circuit, which included the Nicola Valley. In 1876, the local community built St. Andrew's Presbyterian Church on the cemetery site. In 1882, a house was purchased as the manse to accommodate the Murray family. After the creation of the United Church, the congregation was renamed Murray United to honour the former minister.

About 750 metres (820 yd) eastward, the Nicola Pioneer Cemetery (Anglican) was established beside the lake. The first burial was in 1899 and the official dedication in 1905. In 1900, St John the Baptist Anglican church building was completed and consecrated. In 1907, a vicarage was built for the first resident minister.

In 1957, Regular services ceased at Murray United.

As late as 1998, the Anglican church remained in periodical use.

== Railway ==
In July 1905, the Canadian Pacific Railway (CP) announced that the railway terminus would be established at Nicola. In November 1906, the eastward advance of CP's Nicola, Kamloops and Similkameen Coal and Railway Company rail head from Spences Bridge reached Nicola, which was 11.6 kilometres (7.2 mi) beyond Merritt. At that time, a station building, two-stall engine house, and 45,000-litre; 12,000-US-gallon (10,000 imp gal) enclosed water tank were erected.

CP proposed to later extend the track eastward via Quilchena to Princeton, indicating that Nicola would become a divisional point. In 1910, CP instead extended southeastward from Merritt, leaving Nicola as an isolated spur.

Nicola passenger service operated April 1907–October 1957. A section crew was based 1907–c.1912. Fire destroyed the engine house in 1912. The water tank existed until the 1920s. The station building was removed in 1945. The Nicola spur track was lifted in 1980.

== Later community ==
The community comprises scattered rural properties. Immediately to the west of the Murray United church is the Nicola Ranch Country Gifts store, which opened in the mid-1990s.

Only the brick chimney of the church survived an arson fire in 2019. After rebuilding to the original design, a ceremony celebrated the 2022 reopening. The small cemetery surrounds the building. In 2020, the Nicola Pioneer Cemetery by the lake was rededicated following a major restoration project. In 2022, the Nicola Ranch received the Angus Breeder of the Year award.
