= Quilchena (disambiguation) =

Quilchena may refer to:

- Quilchena, a small community on the south shore of Nicola Lake, British Columbia
- Quilchena Airport
- Quilchena Elementary School (Richmond)
- Quilchena Elementary School (Vancouver)
- Vancouver-Quilchena, an electoral district in British Columbia, Canada
