= John Monck (film producer) =

John Monck (1908–1999), name at birth John Goldman(n), was an English film editor and producer, in later life a farmer. A communist, he worked mainly on documentaries and newsreels, but is best remembered as the editor of Man of Aran.

== Life ==
He was the elder son of Sydney Goldman and his wife Agnes Peel, born at Rottingdean, and was educated at Harrow School. Paul Rotha suggests Goldman had university education, but there is no evidence he took a degree.

=== Films ===
In the late 1920s, Goldman became a film editor at Gainsborough Pictures, after being introduced to Michael Balcon in 1928. On his own account, it came about through Simon Rowson, a contact of his father's as a political researcher, and connected with the Gainsborough management. Interested by Soviet cinema, he went to the Soviet Union. Falling ill, he returned to the United Kingdom, where he found he was suffering from diphtheria. He went back to work at Gainsborough, and was credited as editor on Michael and Mary (1931), alongside Ian Dalrymple. At the same period, he also edited Sunshine Susie.

An organiser for the Association of Cinematograph Television and Allied Technicians, Goldman joined the Communist Party of Great Britain not long after his return from the USSR.

==== Man of Aran ====
In 1934 Goldman edited Man of Aran, directed by Robert J. Flaherty. He was keen to go to Ireland to learn camera work from Flaherty, but initially the rushes were sent to London. In the end Balcon sent him to Ireland, where he began to edit the very extensive accumulated takes developed in a "field laboratory" into a film, beginning with the final storm scene. A provisional edit took nine months. Then further changes were made in London.

Rotha considers that Goldman, a "young and not greatly experienced" constructivist editor, influenced by Pudovkin and Eisenstein differed greatly in his ideas from Flaherty, who had "an intuitive feeling for putting one shot after another" without a framework of continuity. Flaherty, "unable to write a script", "did not understand, or even want to understand, the fundamental technique of film editing", and on the other hand Goldman was a professional editor. Rotha writes that "It was perhaps largely because of Goldman's tact, as well as his respect for Flaherty, that the film was finished without a shattering battle." Balcon remained hands-off. Ted Black and publicity man Hugh Findlay were liaison with the studio, and Balcon made concessions to Flaherty.

In How the Myth was Made, the 1978 film by George C. Stoney and James B. Brown on Man of Aran, John Monck (as Goldman by then was) was clear that "it was not a documentary; it was not intended to be a documentary ... it was a piece of poetry."

Rotha's biography of Flaherty quotes Monck's view that a type of regression is to be seen in Flaherty's films, towards "romanticized childhood". Goldman turned down an offer to work on Flaherty's Elephant Boy.

==== Documentaries ====
Goldman, who changed his surname officially to Monck during early 1939 (see below), developed a documentary film with working title Health for the Nation with two top civil servants, Arthur Rucker, and George North (1895–1971), who was Head of Public Relations at the Ministry of Health 1938–1940. It laid a heavy emphasis on historical factors affecting public health. Monck, who by then had contributed social issues content to The March of Time, and had carried out health survey work in Wales with his photographer wife Margaret, applied in September 1938 with an outline script work to the GPO Film Unit. After extensive revisions, asked for by Rucker and North, it appeared in 1939 under the title Forty Million People.

During World War II Monck was a film producer for the Crown Film Unit, based at Pinewood Studios. He worked on a number of films made for the Ministry of Information, including Wavell's 30000 and Malta GC. A project of Monck's under the title Calling All Peoples, aimed at occupied Europe, involved Jiří Weiss and Laurie Lee. It hit difficulties with the script, and had to be abandoned. Monck helped Pat Jackson with approval at the early stages of the treatment of Western Approaches, which Ian Dalrymple went on to produce.

After the war Monck made documentaries with Sergei Nolbandov. He contributed to the monthly cinemagazine This Modern Age of the Rank Organisation, with the initial Homes for All in 1946, and Coal Crisis (issue 7 in 1947).

=== Farming ===
Monck also farmed. After a short period working for Alexander Korda in the later 1930s, he left the film industry in 1939, and settled on a farm in Sussex with his wife. He was recruited away to the Crown Film Unit in 1940, returning to farming in 1947 in Hampshire, then Wiltshire. He encouraged Bernard Gribble, then at Lewes Grammar School, to take up film as a career after a chance meeting in 1942/3 in a Sussex farmhouse.

Monck's address in a 1961 directory was Dugdales Farm, Compton Bassett. In 1936 it was bought by William Spurrett Fielding-Johnson, and on his death in 1953 it passed to his wife Noel, who sold it in 1956. Monck bought the farm in 1957, from Anthony Staveley, added another farm to it, and sold it in 1966 to Robin Clark. From the end of the 1960s he was interested in forage crop drying, setting up a company to market his Hayflaker system, based at Aldern Bridge House, Newbury, Berkshire.

== Family ==
In 1934 John Goldman married Margaret Thesiger, daughter of the late Frederic Thesiger, 1st Viscount Chelmsford; they had met when she was aged 18, around 1929. The couple had a son, Robert Frederick Thesiger Monck, christened in 1939, and another son, Charles (born 1945).

John Goldman Monk Goldman changed his name legally to John Monk Monck, on 22 February 1939. The name Monck was stated to be the original family name. In the 1870s Bernard Goldmann, Sydney Goldman's father, lived for a period in Breslau with his family, and a tutor to the children, Dr. Monck, was stated to be an uncle.

Margaret Monck (1911–1991) was from a conventional upper-class background. Working for a spell at the Lefevre Gallery in the later 1920s, she became a photographer. She had some tuition from Edith Tudor-Hart, and admired the work of Frances H. Flaherty. In the 1930s she did candid photography in the poorer inner suburbs of London. She used a Leica and recorded Camden Town, Clerkenwell and the East End. Some of her photographs are in the collections of the Museum of London and the National Media Museum. Extracts of letters written by her father to her mother, and watercolours by her mother, passed to John Monck on her death.

With his younger brother Victor, known as Penryn or Pen, John Monck inherited in 1958 on his father's death a collection of pictures. Included was the large work The Last Sleep of Arthur in Avalon, which the brothers sold in 1963.
