= The Last Sleep of Arthur in Avalon =

Burne-Jones's magnum opus

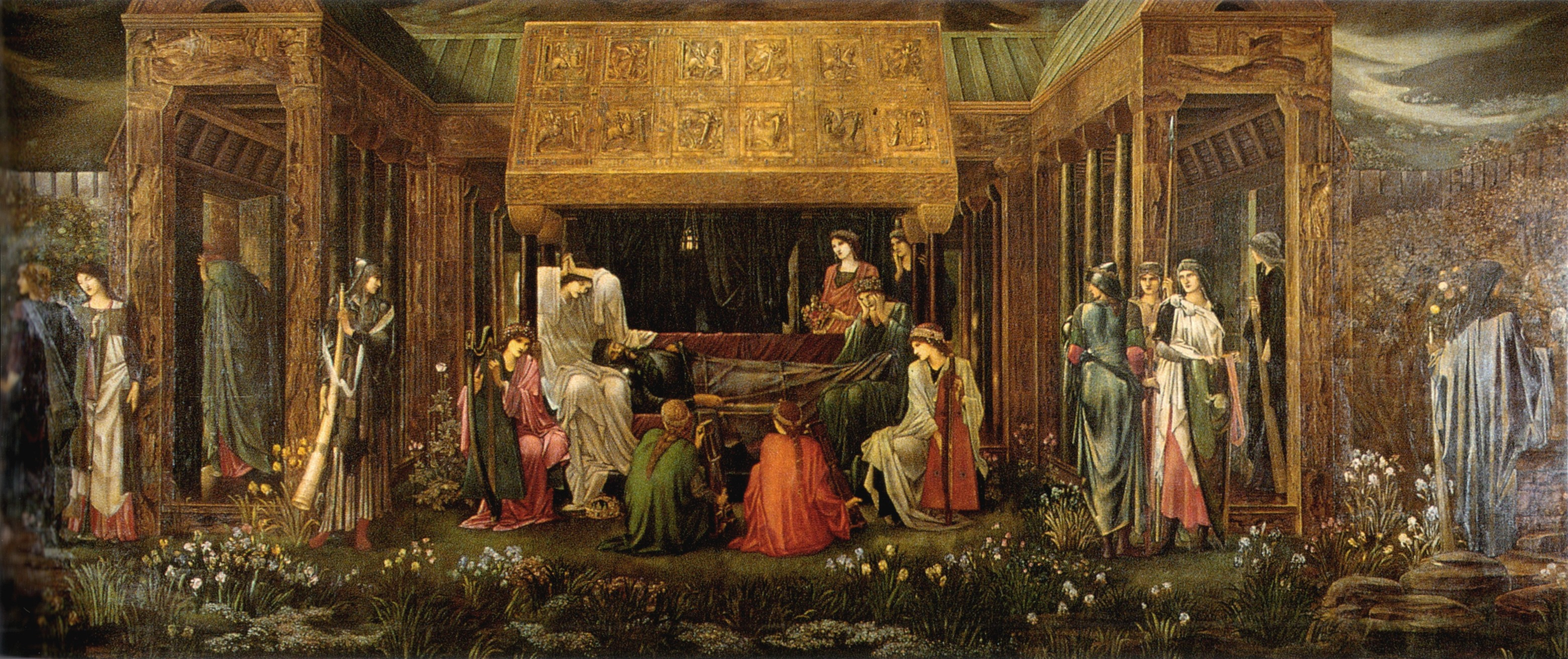
- Artist: Edward Burne-Jones
- Year: c. 1881–1898
- Dimensions: 279 cm × 650 cm (110 in × 260 in)
- Location: Museo de Arte de Ponce; Ponce, Puerto Rico

The Last Sleep of Arthur in Avalon is a painting by the English artist Edward Burne-Jones, started in 1881. The massive painting measures 279 cm × 650 cm, and is widely considered to be Burne-Jones's magnum opus.

The painting was originally commissioned from Burne-Jones by his patron George Howard, 9th Earl of Carlisle, to hang on a wall in the library of Naworth Castle. Howard shared Burne-Jones's affection for the Arthurian legend and left the choice of topic to the artist. Burne-Jones started working on it in 1881 and continued for 17 years. Within this period, he also designed the stage set for the play King Arthur by J. Comyns Carr that premiered in London in January 1895.

The 1880s brought the deaths of Burne-Jones's close friends. As they died, the artist experienced mounting isolation and painful awareness of his own mortality. Immersed in his work, Burne-Jones identified himself with Arthur and even adopted Arthur's pose when he himself slept. By 1885, the association with Arthur reached the point where Burne-Jones had to ask Howard to cancel or revise his original commission, replacing the grand scene with a smaller painting focused on the departed king. Howard agreed to the cancellation and never requested his down payment back. Nevertheless, Burne-Jones returned to the original grand painting and worked on it for the remaining thirteen years of his life. Arthur became increasingly autobiographical for the artist as he withdrew into himself; "above all, the picture is about silence."

How is it you are in Avalon, where I have striven to be with all my might — and how did you get there and how does Arthur the King? ...

— Edward Burne-Jones, a letter to a friend in Avallon, France, 1886

A popular opinion holds that Burne-Jones modelled Arthur's appearance after William Morris, the last survivor of a once-strong progressive art circle, and that Morris's physical decline was a major inspiration for the painting. However, Debra Mancoff argues that there is no record of Morris posing as Arthur and that the king's image was completed when Morris was in vigorous health. Morris died in 1896; Burne-Jones lived for two more years and died before the painting was complete. Just one day before his death, Burne-Jones continued work on Arthur. Towards the end of his life, he wrote, "I need nothing but my hands and my brain to fashion myself a world to live in that nothing can disturb. In my own land, I am king of it." His widow described Arthur as a "task of love to which [the artist] put no limit of time or labour."

Following the artist's death in 1898, the painting in its frame with Latin inscription passed from his executors to Sydney Goldman, who was acquainted in Rottingdean with Burne-Jones. His sons, John and Penryn Monck, sold the work at auction at Christie's on 26 April 1963. There it was bought by Luis A. Ferré, a politician and founder of the Ponce Museum of Art who would later become Governor of Puerto Rico. Burne-Jones was out of fashion at this time so its export was allowed despite some objections.

The Last Sleep of Arthur in Avalon is owned by the Ponce Museum of Art in Puerto Rico. It was exhibited at Tate Britain in London in 2009–10 while the Ponce museum underwent restoration. The painting was also on view at that time at the Prado Museum in Madrid for the exhibition The Sleeping Beauty: Victorian Painting from The Museo de Arte de Ponce (2 February 2009 – 31 May 2009).

== See also ==
- List of paintings by Edward Burne-Jones

== Sources ==
- William Waters (1973). Burne-Jones: An Illustrated Life of Sir Edward Burne-Jones. Osprey Publishing. ISBN 978-0-85263-199-7.
- Debra N. Mancoff (2000). "Infinite Rest. Sleep, Death and Awakening in Late Works by Edward Burne-Jones". Biographical Passages: Essays in Victorian and Modernist Biography. Honoring Mary M. Lago. University of Missouri Press. ISBN 0-8262-1256-5.
- Wildman, Stephen: Edward Burne-Jones, Victorian artist-dreamer, Metropolitan Museum of Art, 1998, ISBN 0-87099-859-5
