= Nicola Athapaskans =

Total population
- assimilated

Regions with significant populations
- Nicola Country, British Columbia, Canada

Languages
- Nicola

The Nicola Athapaskans, also known as the Nicola people or Stuwix, were an Athabascan people who migrated into the Nicola Country of what is now the Southern Interior of British Columbia from the north a few centuries ago but were slowly reduced in number by constant raiding from peoples from outside the valley (mostly Secwepemc), with the survivors, the last of whom lived near Nicola Lake, assimilated to the Scw'exmx-Syilx Nicola people by the end of the 19th century. The term Nicola for them is a misnomer, though a common one used by ethnologists and linguists - it commemorates a famous Okanagan chief who once held sway over the valley and its peoples as well as over the Kamloops Shuswap.

First appearing in the Bonaparte River valley and at Spences Bridge, they came into conflict with the Secwepemc and Nlaka'pamux peoples of that area, the Thompson Canyon, after journeying south to get away from "bad neighbours". At first in conflict with the Nlaka'pamux, peaceful terms were come to and they were invited to settle in the area of Nicola Lake and the upper Similkameen Country and lived alongside the valley's mix of Okanagan and Nlaka'pamux-speaking groups. The latter's name for them is the only indigenous name that exists for them, stuwix ("strangers"), as their own language, known as Nicola, did not survive and very little is known about it, as only a very little was recorded before it became extinct. At one time the Stuwix had also lived in the upper Similkameen and are credited by historian Mark S. Wade as being the first known inhabitants of that area until they were driven out by the group today constituted as the Upper Similkameen Indian Band and retreating to the area of Douglas, Stump and Nicola Lakes, where they were sheltered by Chief Nicola and the Scw'exmx and Spaxomin who lived under his rule. Despite friendly relations with their immediate neighbours, they were subject to repeated raids by hostile tribes, notably the Secwepemc (Shuswap) and by the later 19th century only a handful survived. Very little is known of them as by the mid-19th century they were nearly extinct due to constant raiding by Thompson and Shuswap from outside the valley, and their surviving members were largely absorbed by the surrounding Scw'exmx, a branch of the Thompson people by the time of European contact, and also partly by the Spaxomin, a branch of the Okanagan people also in the valley who are also known as the Spahomin Band. Some family lines are thought to survive among the Scwe'exmx, and a handful of placenames in the Merritt-Princeton area are believed to be from their language, which some linguists believe may be closely related to, or simply a dialect of, the Chilcotin language.

== Another account ==
Although the anthropological and linguistic consensus is that the Nicola people were Athapaskan, an account in Okanagan Mourning Dove's writings says that they were a Chinookan group who had travelled up the Columbia River to escape bad neighbours there, finally finding refuge up the Okanagan River and beyond the upper Similkameen around Nicola Lake.

== See also ==
- Nicola language
