= Gustav Pope =

British painter

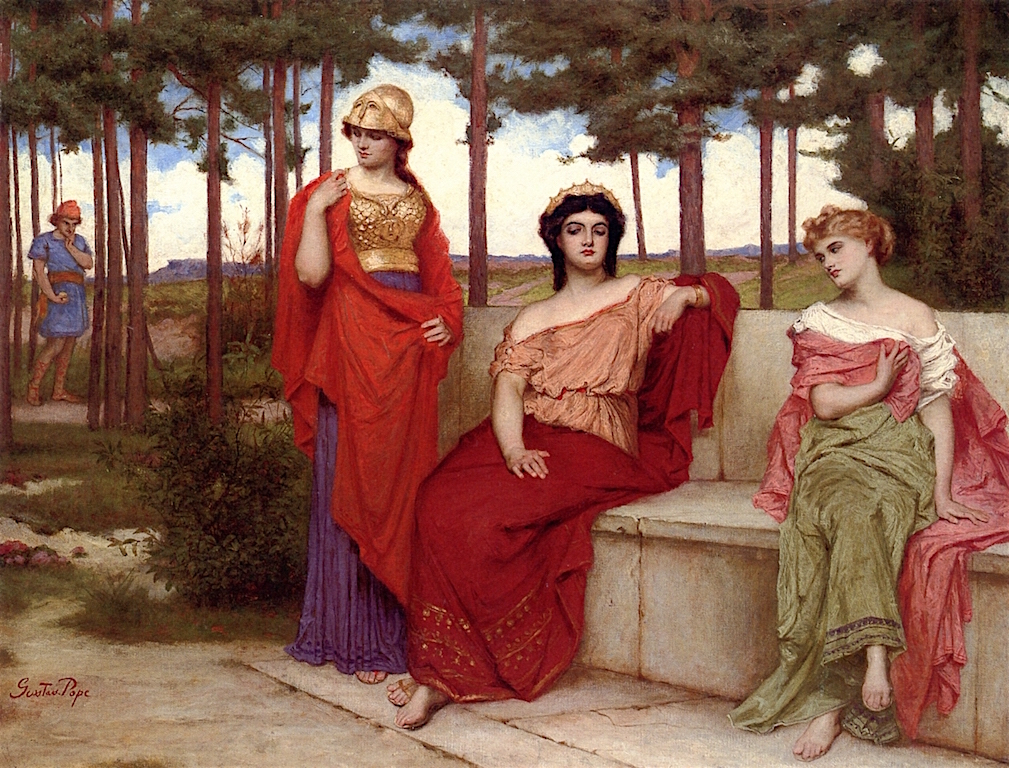
- The Judgement of Paris, painting by Gustav Pope
- Born: 1831
- Died: 1910 (aged 78–79)
- Known for: Painter
- Movement: Orientalist

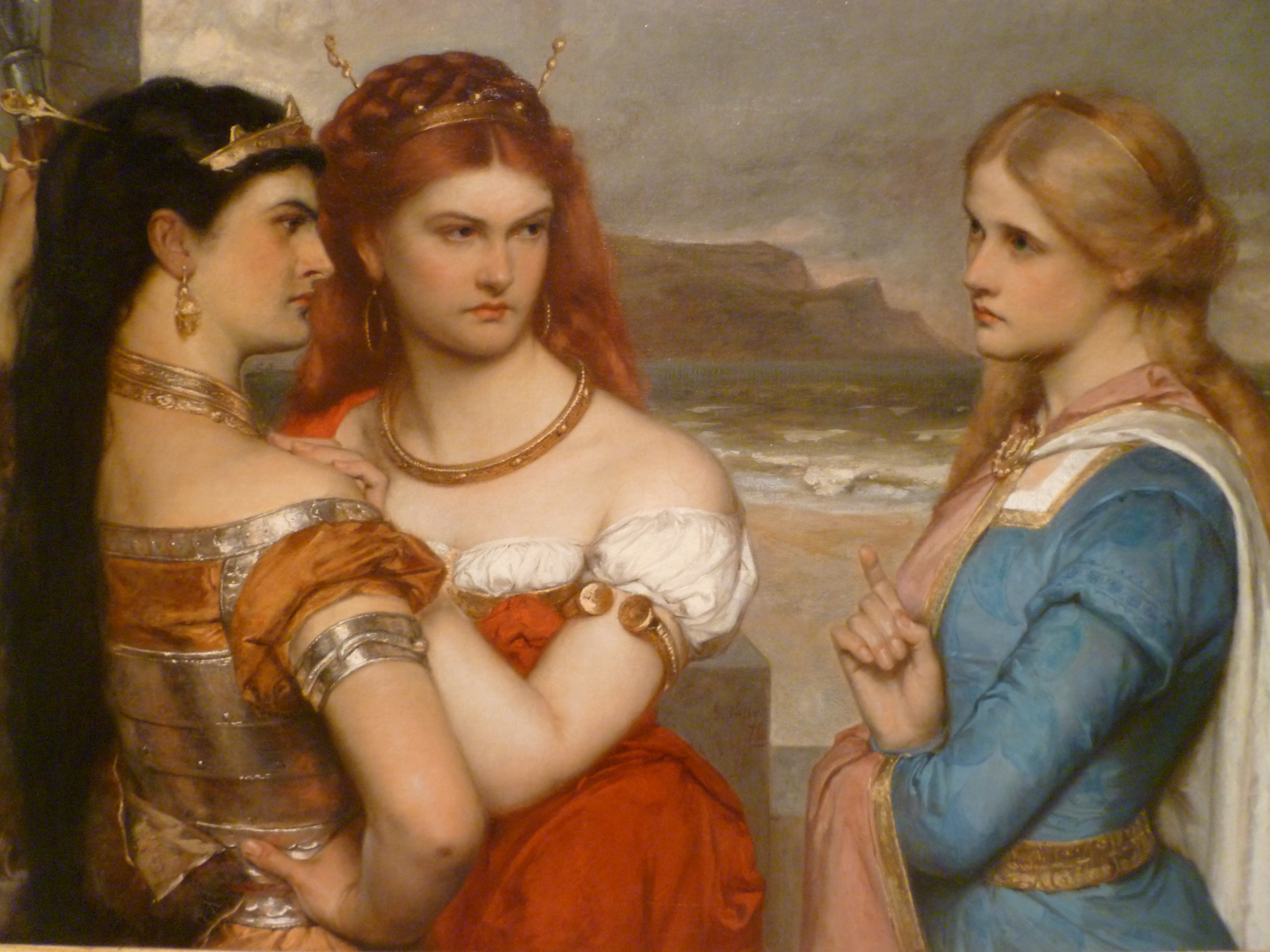
The Three Daughters of King Lear (1875–6) by Gustav Pope in the Museo de Arte de Ponce, Puerto Rico

Gustav Pope (1831–1910) was a British Victorian painter of Austrian origin. He used several styles in his work, but in his mature style he showed influences of the second wave of the Pre-Raphaelite Brotherhood.

His work shows the influence of Thomas Seddon, Dante Gabriel Rossetti and Frederic, Lord Leighton. English literary sources, classical mythology, portraiture and idealized images of young women are the most typical subjects in his paintings.

Gustav Pope's work is exhibited at the Royal Academy of Arts in Burlington House, alongside the paintings of contemporary peer artists including Frank Dicksee, Millais and Alma Tadema.

== Life and career ==
Little is known about Pope's training as a painter, but he is listed as a regular exhibitor in London from 1852 to 1895, at the British Institution, the Royal Society of British Artists and the Royal Academy.

In the 1870s, he was known to reside in Knightsbridge, London at Chatham House, High Road, as detailed on artist submission labels and exhibition catalogues.

Some sources shows Gustav Pope as deceased by 1895, based on the last year he was exhibiting at the Royal Academy. Nevertheless, a Cemetery register shows 1910 as the year of his death. In 1910, the painting A Rainy Day was presented to the Bristol City Museum and Art Gallery. He was a resident of Chelsea, according to the 1901 London Census.

== Selected works ==
- The Three Daughters of King Lear (1875–76; Museo de Art de Ponce, Puerto Rico)
- Lillies (1874), sold at Auction at Christie's, London in 2009
- The Judgement of Paris (The Apple of the Discord) (1889), sold at auction at Christie's, London in 2006.
- Dante’s Inspiration, sold at auction at Christie's, London in 2014.

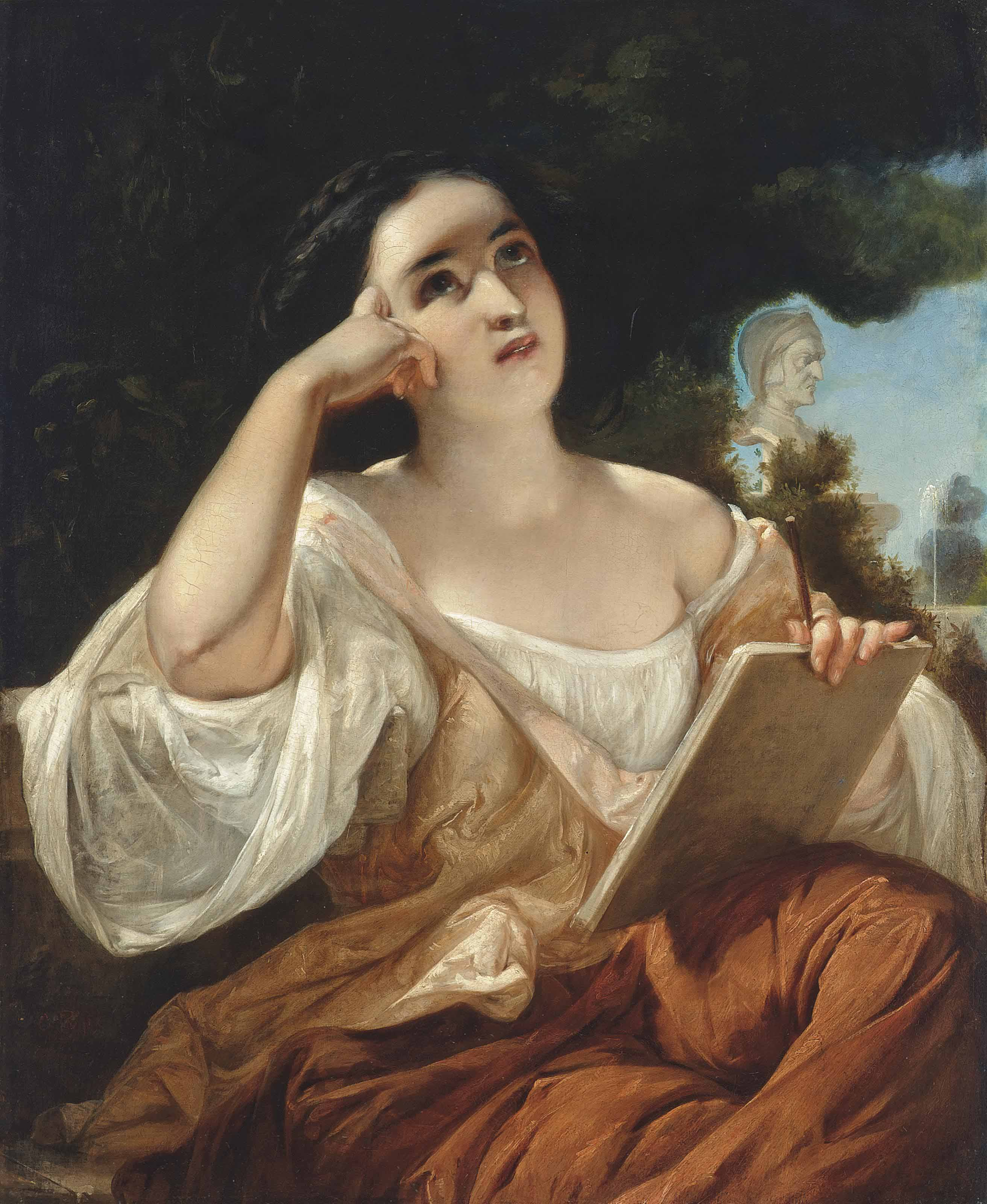
Gustav Pope - Dante's Inspiration

- Accident or Design? work later engraved for The Illustrated London Almanack
- Miss Ida Foster (1878), private collection, selected in 1880 for the annual Royal Academy of Arts exhibition.
