= Nicola language =

Extinct Athabascan language of Canada

Nicola
- Native to: Canada
- Region: British Columbia
- Ethnicity: Nicola Athapaskans
- Extinct: early 1900s
- Language family: Na-Dené: Athabaskan–Eyak; Athabaskan; Northern; Tsilhqotʼin ?; Nicola

Language codes
- ISO 639-3: None (mis)
- Glottolog: nico1265

Nicola is an extinct Athabascan language formerly spoken in the Similkameen and Nicola Countries of British Columbia by the group known to linguists and ethnographers as the Nicola people, although that name in modern usage refers to an alliance of Interior Salishan bands living in the same area. Almost nothing is known of the language, except for a few words. The available material published by Franz Boas comprised only 30 words. What the Nicola called themselves and their language is unknown. The Salishan-speaking Thompson Indigenous people who absorbed them (today's Nicola people, in part) referred to them as the [stuwix] "the strangers".

So little is known of the language that beyond the fact that it is Athabascan it cannot be classified. Some linguists have suggested that it is merely a displaced dialect of Chilcotin, but the evidence is too little to allow a decision.

== Sources ==
- The Thompson Country, Mark Sweeten Wade
