= Cristóbal Hernández de Quintana =

Spanish painter

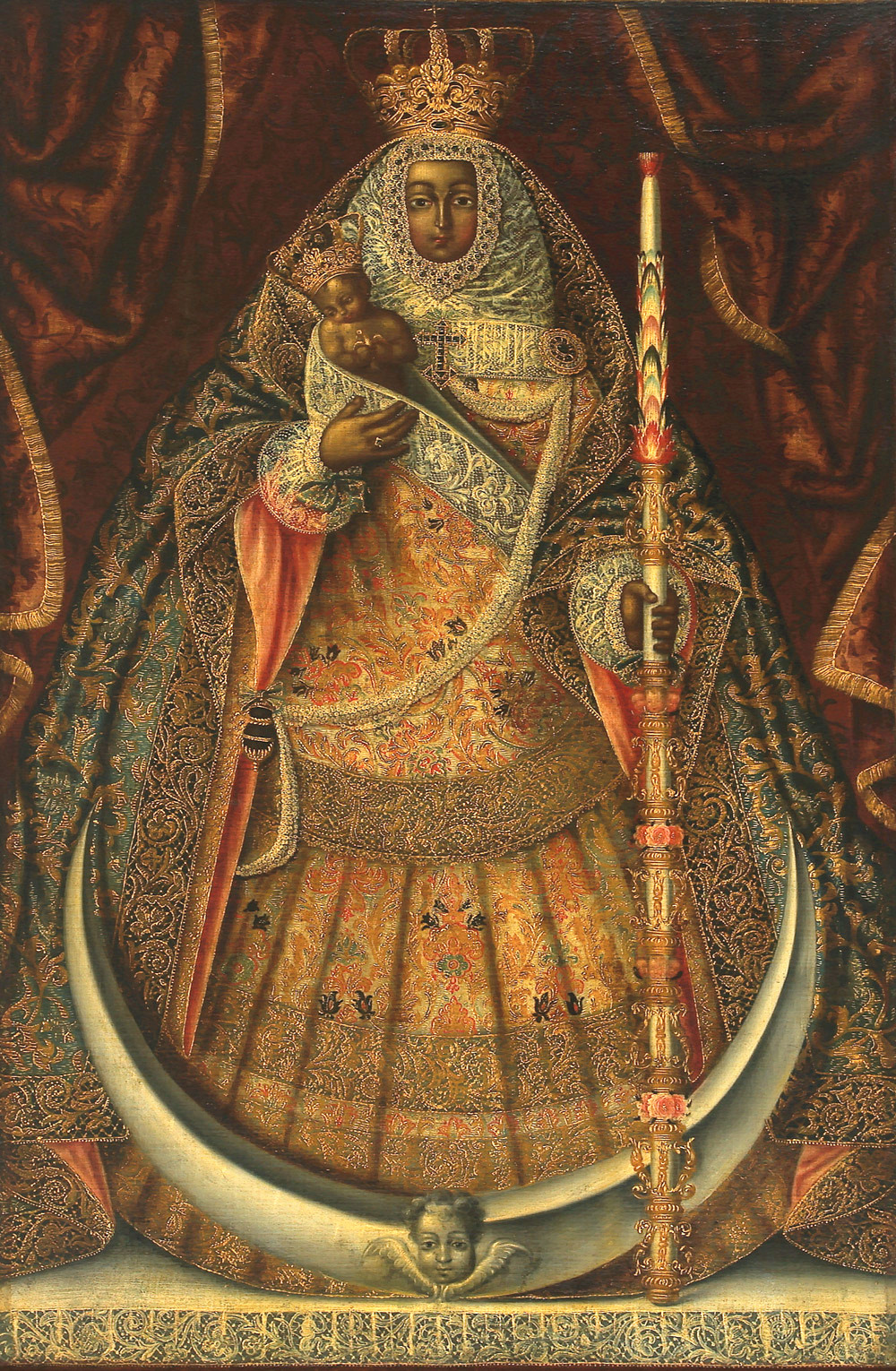
- Virgin of Candelaria designed by Cristóbal Hernández de Quintana. It is in the "Museo de Arte de Ponce (Puerto Rico).
- Born: 1651; La Orotava, Tenerife, Spain
- Died: 1725 (aged 73–74); San Cristóbal de La Laguna, Tenerife, Spain
- Known for: Baroque painting
- Notable work: Altarpieces, paintings of the Virgin of Candelaria, restoration of Juan de Roelas' painting
- Style: Baroque
- Spouse(s): María Pérez de Vera (first marriage), María Perdomo de la Concepción (second marriage)
- Children: 6

Cristóbal Hernández de Quintana (1651–1725) was a Spanish baroque painter, the most prominent representative of Baroque painting in the Canary Islands.

== Biography ==
Born in La Orotava (Tenerife) as the illegitimate son of a wealthy family from the neighboring town of Los Realejos. Cristóbal Hernández was welcomed and raised by a mulatta. At an unknown date he moved to Las Palmas de Gran Canaria where the June 15, 1671 he married María Pérez de Vera and only a year later, with little more than twenty years, he was already an apprentice in his workshop.

On the death of his mother in 1679 he returned to Tenerife where he took up residence in the city of San Cristóbal de La Laguna where he remarried María Perdomo de la Concepción in 1686. From this marriage they were born at least six children.

Among his major works include those of religious subjects as altarpieces and paintings. Highlights include the altarpiece of the ancient Basilica of Candelaria or paintings representing the Virgin of Candelaria and in 1724 the restoration of a painting of Juan de Roelas owned by the Cathedral of Santa Ana of Las Palmas de Gran Canaria.

He died in 1725 in San Cristóbal de La Laguna.
