= Museo de Arte de Ponce =

Art museum in Ponce, Puerto Rico

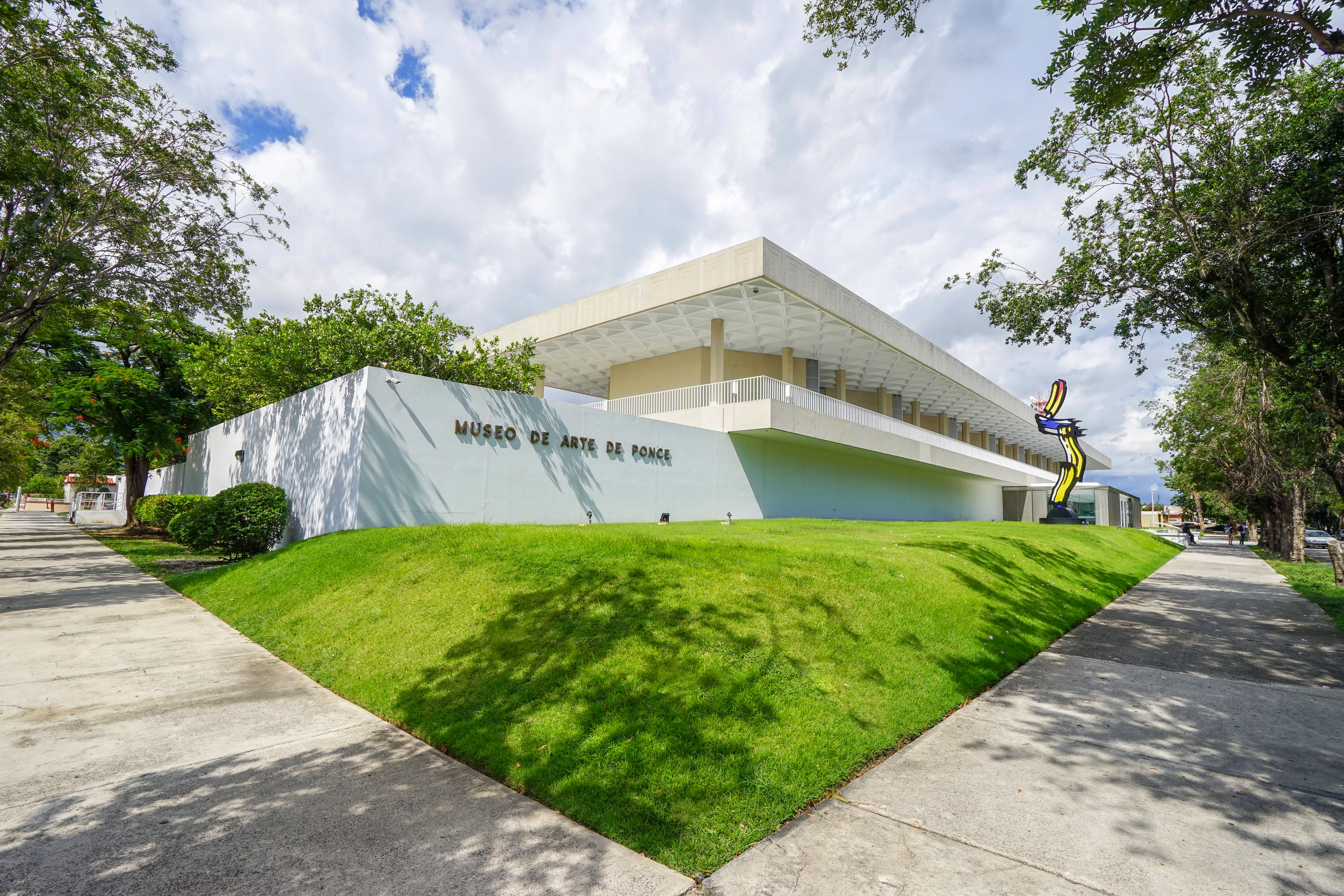
- Interactive fullscreen map
- Established: 1959
- Location: 2325 Avenida Las Américas, Ponce, Puerto Rico
- Coordinates: 18°00′14″N 66°37′01″W
- Type: Art museum
- Accreditation: American Alliance of Museums
- Key holdings: -Flaming June -The Last Sleep of Arthur in Avalon
- Collections: Baroque; Pre-Raphaelite; Golden Age; Latin American art Puerto Rican art
- Collection size: 4,500 pieces (2010)
- Visitors: 90,000 (2010)
- Director: Marcos Montero
- President: María Luisa Ferré Rangel
- Curator: Iraida Rodríguez-Negrón
- Architect: Edward Durell Stone
- Owners: Private: Fundación Luis A. Ferré, Inc.
- Public transit access: SITRAS, "Linea Anaranjada" (Orange Line): Buses E, F, G (Museo stop)
- Website: www.museoarteponce.org

Museo de Arte de Ponce (MAP) is an art museum located on Avenida Las Américas in Ponce, Puerto Rico. It houses a collection of European art, as well as works by Puerto Rican artists. The museum contains one of the most important Pre-Raphaelite collections in the Western Hemisphere, holding some 4,500 pieces of art distributed among fourteen galleries.

Museo de Arte de Ponce is the finest art museum in Puerto Rico. The largest art museum in the Caribbean, it has also been called one of the best in the Americas. It was the first museum in Puerto Rico accredited by the American Alliance of Museums.

It was founded in 1959 by industrialist and philanthropist Luis A. Ferré at a location in the Ponce Historic Zone. The museum moved to its current building location on Avenida Las Américas in 1965. In 2010, the museum increased its size significantly after a $30M expansion.

== History ==
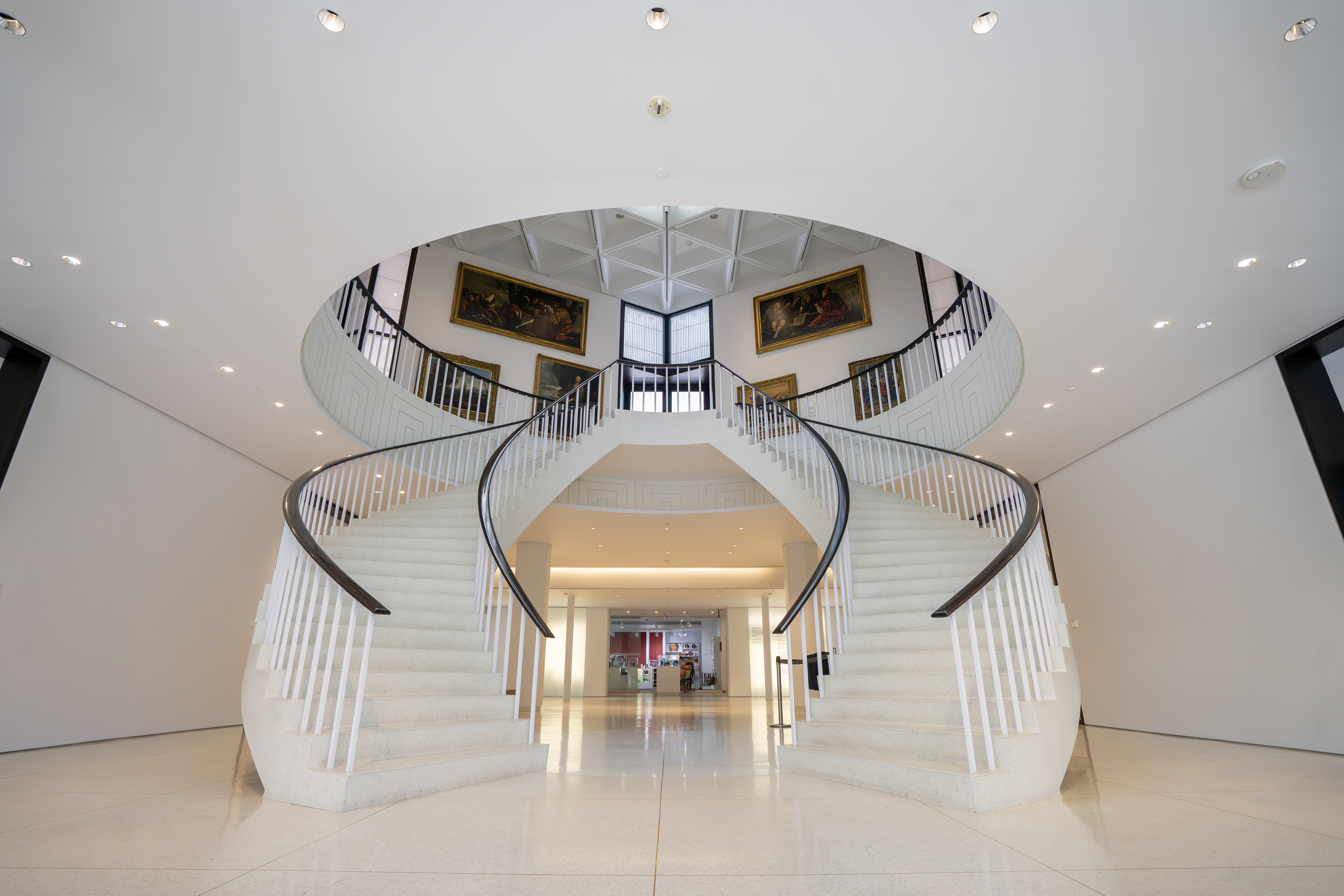
Main hall of the museum External audio: You may see a video of Museo de Arte de Ponce HERE

The project of the museum began in 1956 when Luis A. Ferré traveled to Europe and acquired various European art pieces, including many Pre-Raphaelite works, which encouraged him to start a project for a museum in the city of Ponce, his birthplace. With the advice of two experts – Julius S. Held, specialist on Rubens and professor of Art History at Barnard College and Columbia University, and René Taylor, art and architecture enthusiast and professor at the University of Granada, Yale, and Columbia – Ferré compiled a collection of works of art based on their value instead of their popularity. Ferré would state in a Forbes interview that "the scholars and critics all called it kitsch, everyone thought I was crazy to buy them."

On 3 January 1959, Ferré opened the museum at a house at 70 Cristina Street in Ponce at what is today the Centro Cultural de Ponce, with an exhibit of 72 works of art. Some of these original paintings continue to be on display today. As time passed and the museum gained popularity, additional works of art were added to the collections. In 1962, the Samuel H. Kress Foundation donated 15 paintings to the museum.

Fearing a fire in the Cristina Street building would destroy its collections, Ferré acquired a tract of land on Las Americas Avenue in Ponce to build the current museum, and recruited architect Edward Durell Stone for its design. On 23 April 1964 the first stone was placed and the construction of the museum began. It was finished in 1965 and officially opened on 28 December 1965. One of the main features of the museum is its hexagonal galleries, which allow natural light to enter through its corners bringing an illumination to exhibitions. The museum contained a total of 14 galleries, two gardens, and an amphitheater, and its main entrance with bifurcated ladders.

Pinceladas en Vuelo ("Brushstokes in Flight"), a 28-foot-high aluminum structure created in 1984 by New York sculptor Roy Lichtenstein sits on the front yard of the museum, which was then considered "the largest public [display art] work in Latin America and the Caribbean." By 1989, the museum's collection had grown to 500 pieces, with a then estimated value of $50 million, equivalent to $130 million in present-day terms.

The museum was closed from 2008 to 2010 while undergoing renovations, re-opening in time for the celebration of its 50th anniversary on 13 November 2010, after a $30 million in improvements. In the meantime, the museum held exhibitions in San Juan's Plaza Las Américas, and loaned some of its best pieces out to traveling exhibitions at fine arts institutions around the world.

The construction work was both a renovation of the existing structure as well as an expansion, increasing the size of the museum by more than 40%. The $20-turn-$30 million renovations also included a new building to house a historic archive and a library.

The new 37,745-square-foot (3,506.6 m^{2}) annex to the museum's main building houses an educational space, a library specializing in art history, the Don Luis A. Ferré Archives, a laboratory for the conservation of artworks, an artwork storage area, a museum shop, a restaurant, and administrative offices. After the expansion, the total square footage of the museum came to 77,745 square feet. The expansion intended to provide facilities for educational purposes and an art history library as well as to provide room for a museum shop and a restaurant for guests.

The thoroughfare on which the museum is located, a major road artery in Ponce, was renamed the "Luis A. Ferré Boulevard" in honor of the founder of the museum.

In 2021, the museum was named as a recipient for the National Medal for Museum and Library Service.

== Artworks ==
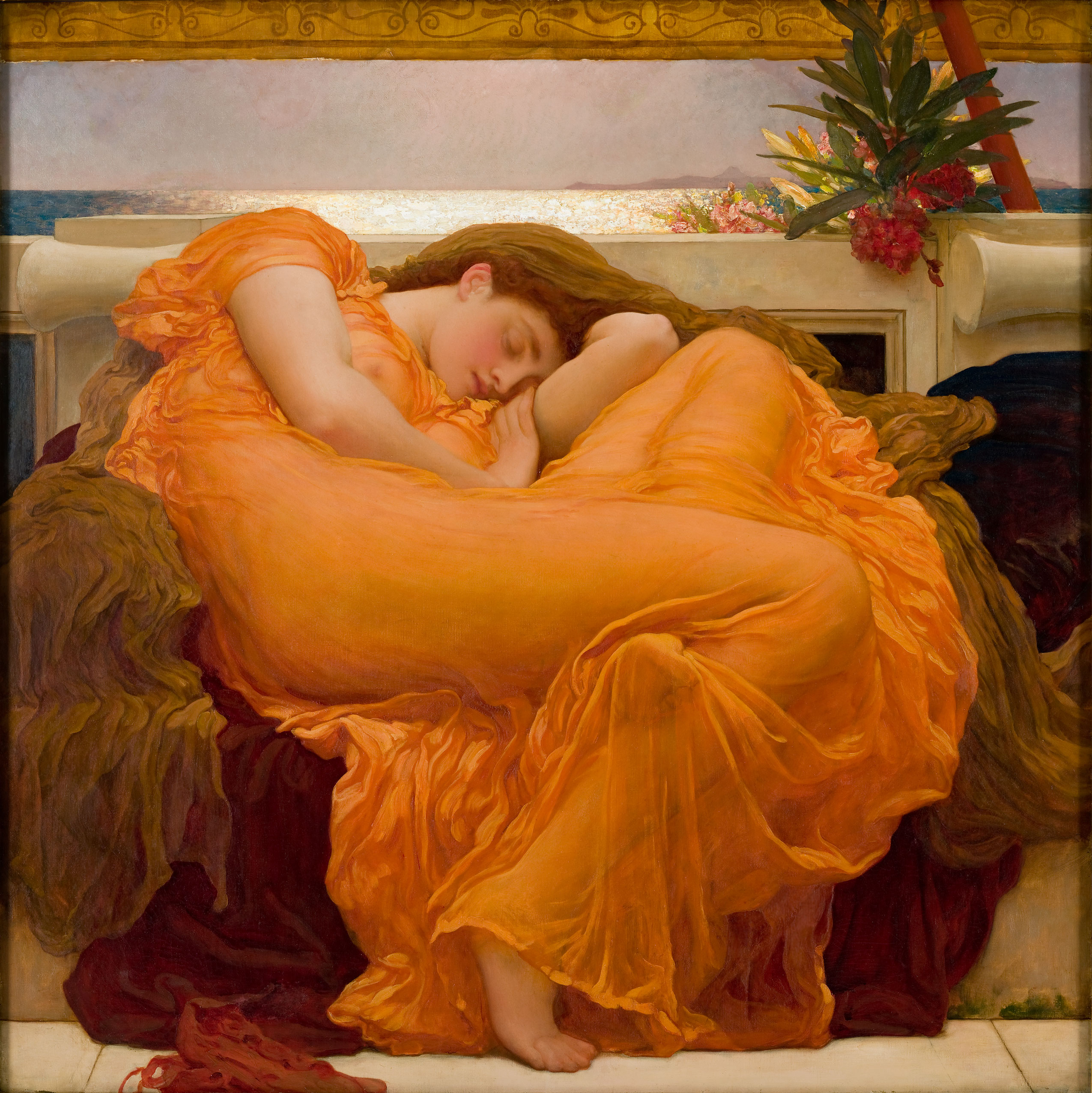
Flaming June, by Frederic Leighton

The Museo de Arte de Ponce houses the most important collection of European art in Latin America. The Financial Times of London states that the museum holds "one of the most distinguished private collections in the Western Hemisphere outside the United States." It has an important collection of almost 4,000 pieces of art that range from the 14th to the 20th century, Italian Baroque, British Pre-Raphaelite, Spanish Golden Age and contemporary Latin-American art.

Some of the artists whose paintings and works are exhibited at the museum are Peter Paul Rubens, Lucas Cranach, Bartolomé Esteban Murillo, Eugène Delacroix, and Sir Edward Burne-Jones, among others. The main masterpiece of the museum is Flaming June, painted by Frederic Leighton. Ferré bought this piece for less than $1,000 in Amsterdam in 1960, and it was his favorite.

The Last Sleep of Arthur in Avalon, the final masterpiece and crowning achievement of Sir Edward Burne-Jones, is another of the main pieces of the museum's collection, originally acquired by Ferré for just 1,600 British guineas in 1963. The enormous painting was started in 1881 and left unfinished at the artist's death in 1898. In 2009, both Flaming June and The Last Sleep of Arthur in Avalon were loaned to Tate Britain while the museum underwent a two-year refurbishment. Other paintings were loaned to the Museo del Prado in Madrid.

"Equally important is the Puerto Rican art collection, which ranges from the 18th century to the present day and includes great masters such as José Campeche, Francisco Oller, Miguel Pou, as well as the best contemporary talent such as Myrna Báez, Francisco Rodón, Antonio Martorell and Arnaldo Roche Rabell, among others."

The museum also displays works by international artists. In March 2006, the museum exhibited the work of Mexican artist Frida Kahlo.

The Museum charges a small admission fee to the public, but most revenues come from substantial donations made by Puerto Rican individuals and businesses. Some have made single donations for the sole purpose of acquiring art to be exhibited in the museum, while others donate for the maintenance and operational expenditures of the museum. A bronze plaque placed in the front entrance and next to the information booth recognizes these donors.

== Selected collection highlights ==
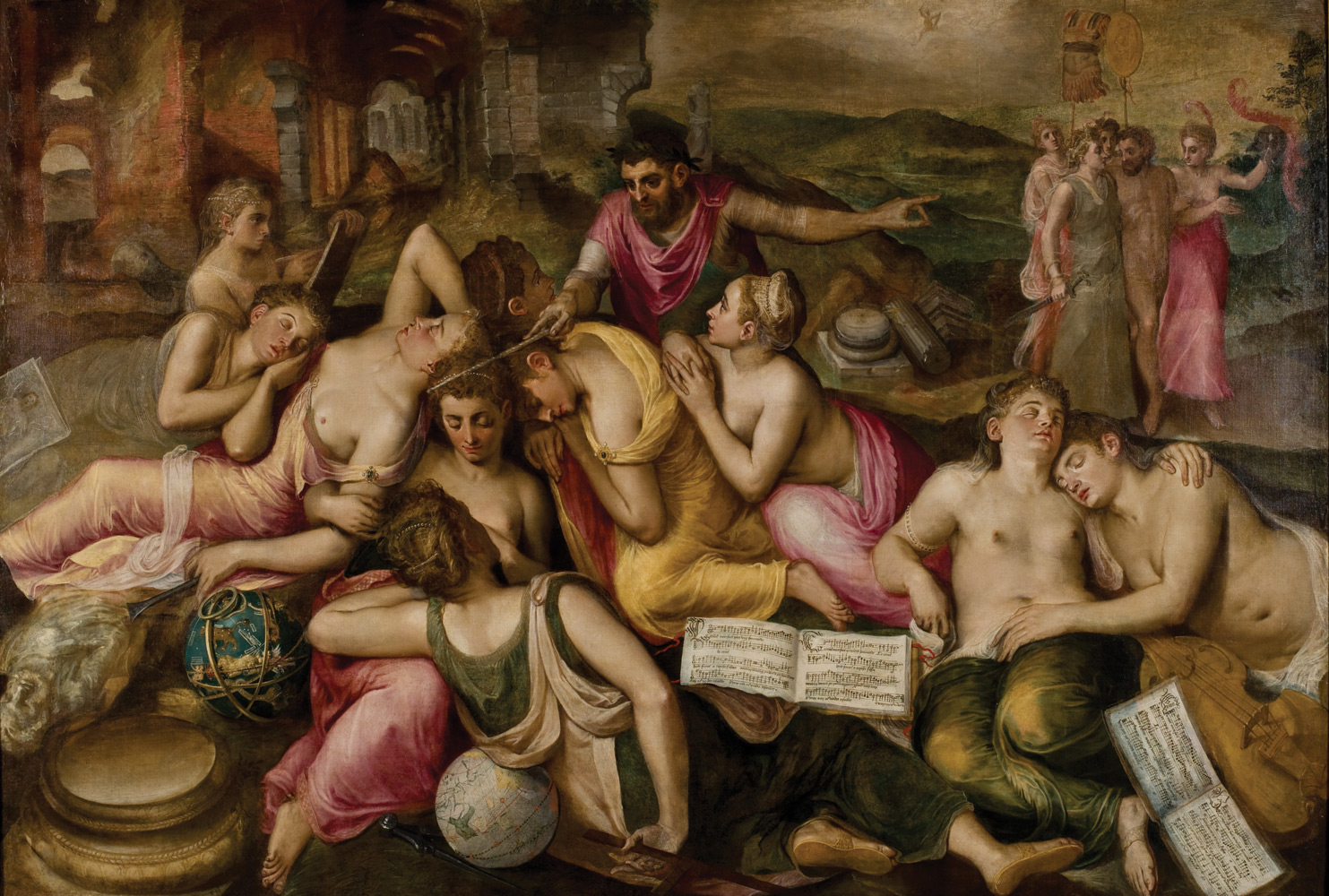
The Awakening of the Arts (c. 1560) by Frans Floris

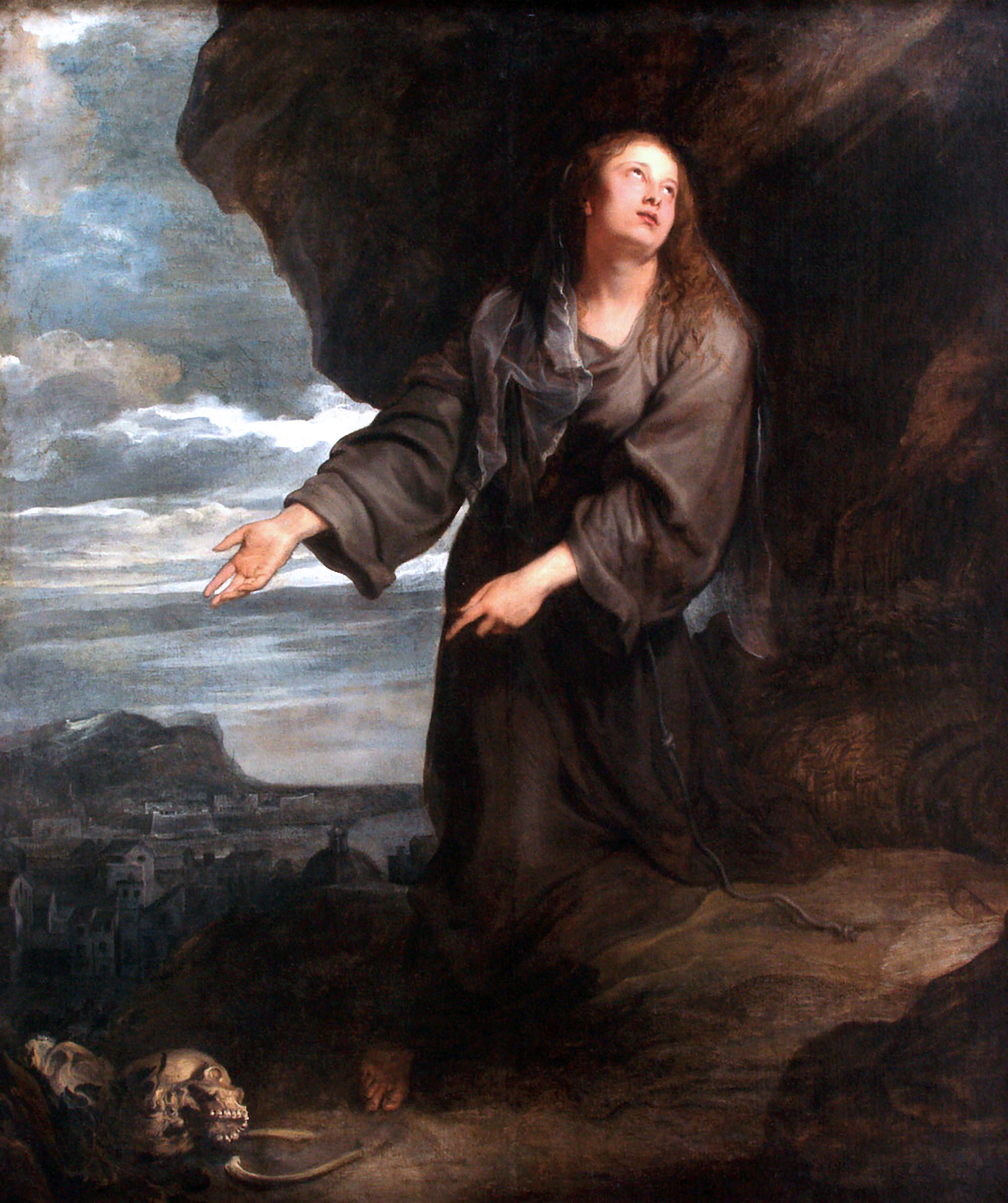
Saint Rosalia Interceding for the City of Palermo (c. 1624-1629) by Anthony van Dyck

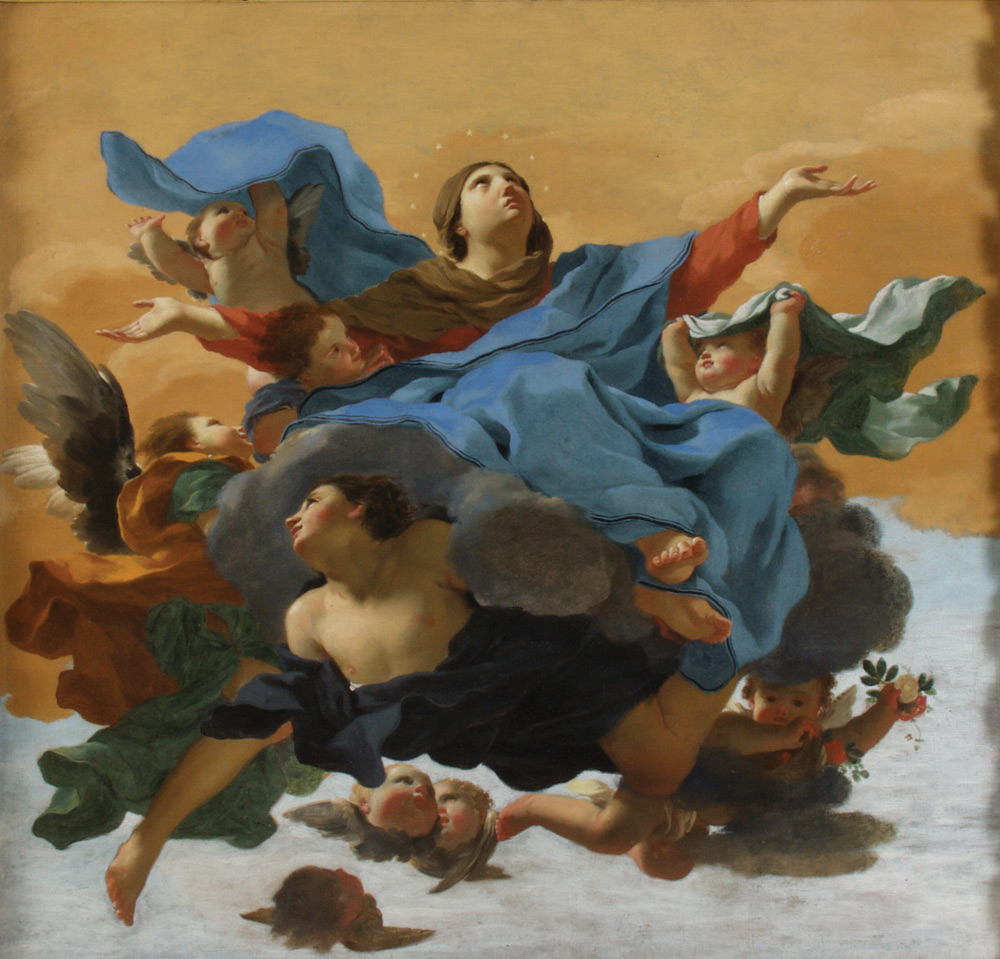
The Assumption of the Virgin (1630) by Charles Mellin

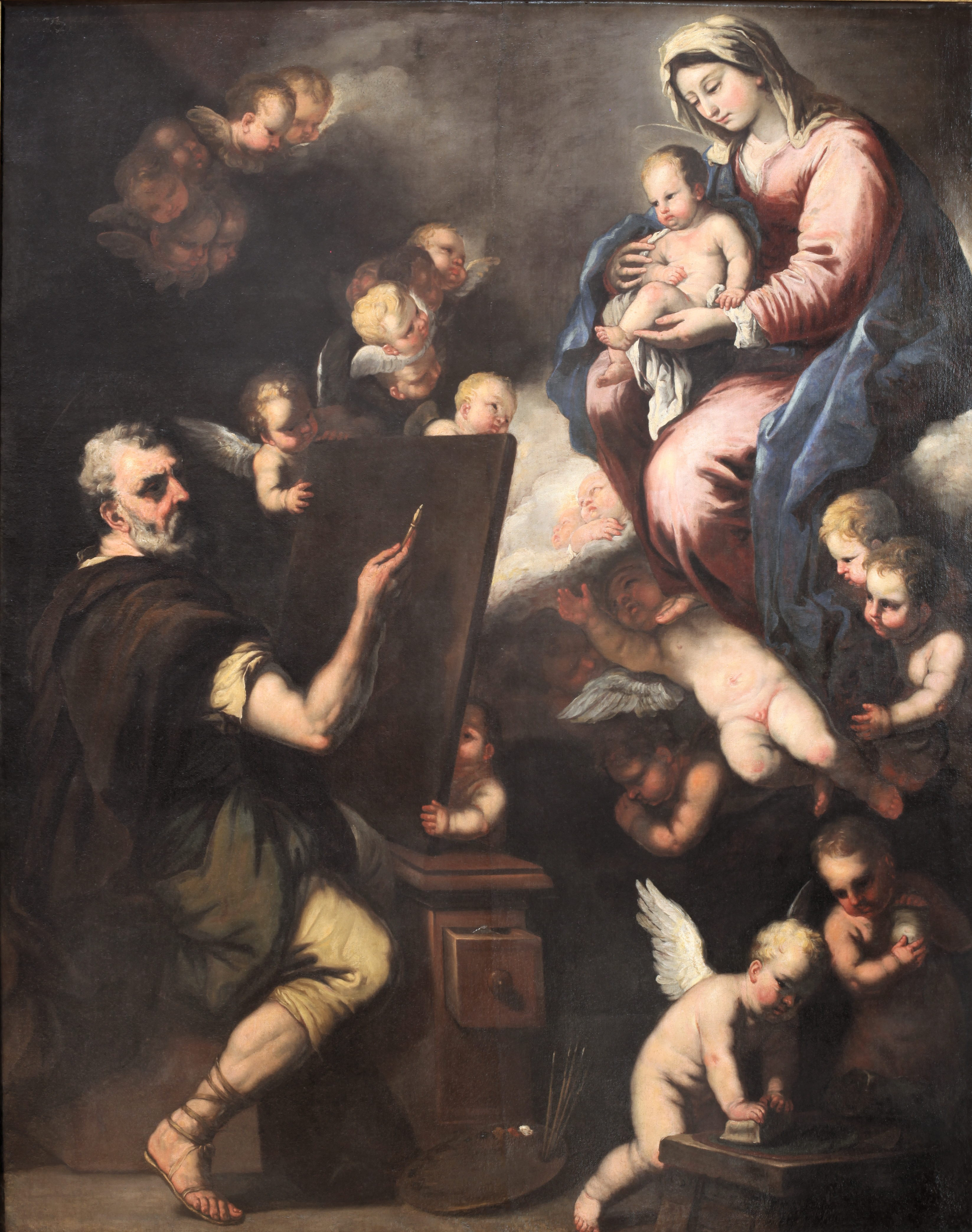
Saint Luke Painting the Virgin (c. 1650-1655) by Luca Giordano

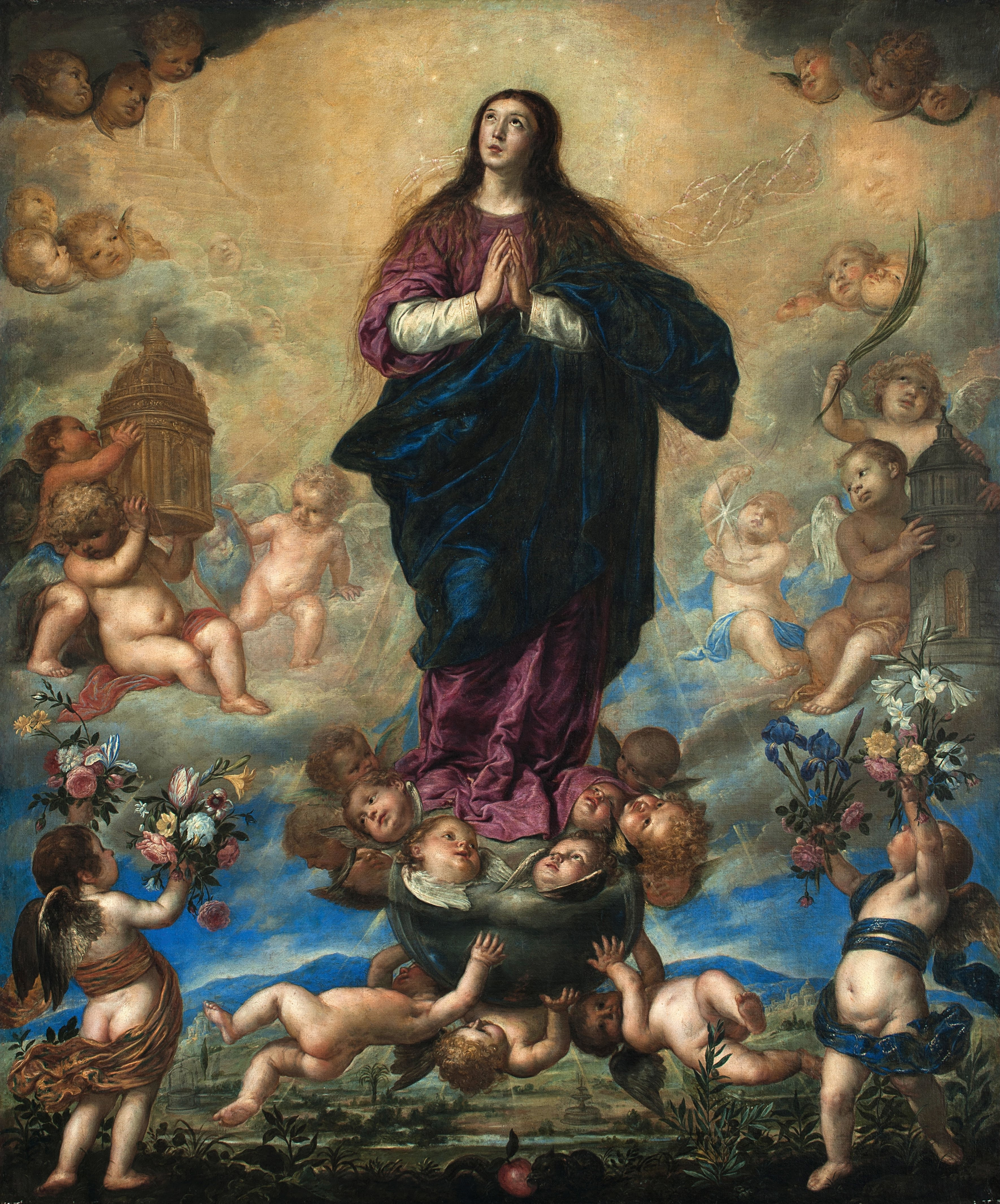
The Immaculate Conception (1657) by Antonio de Pereda

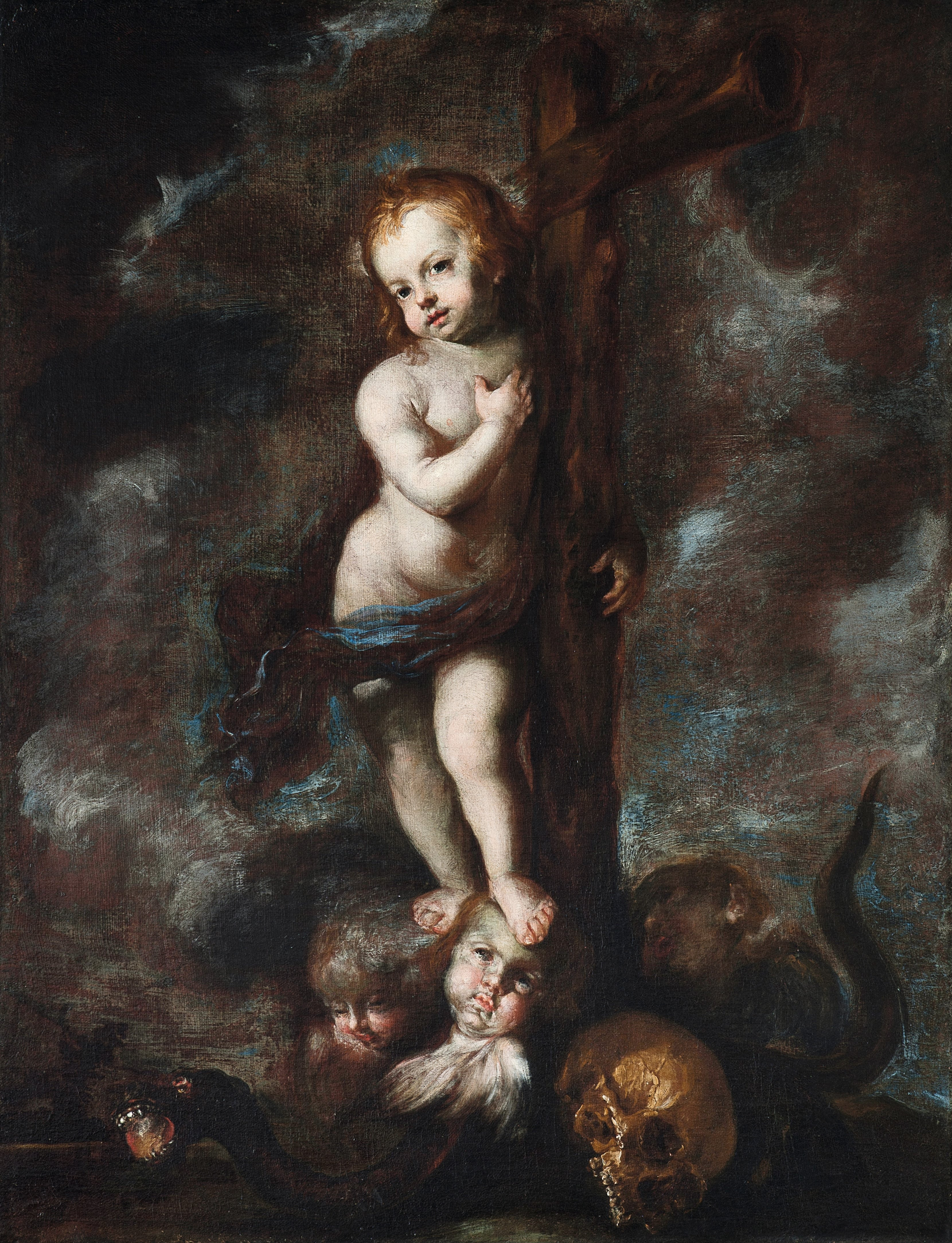
The Infant Jesus as Victor over Sin and Death (c. 1640-1660) by Francisco Camilo

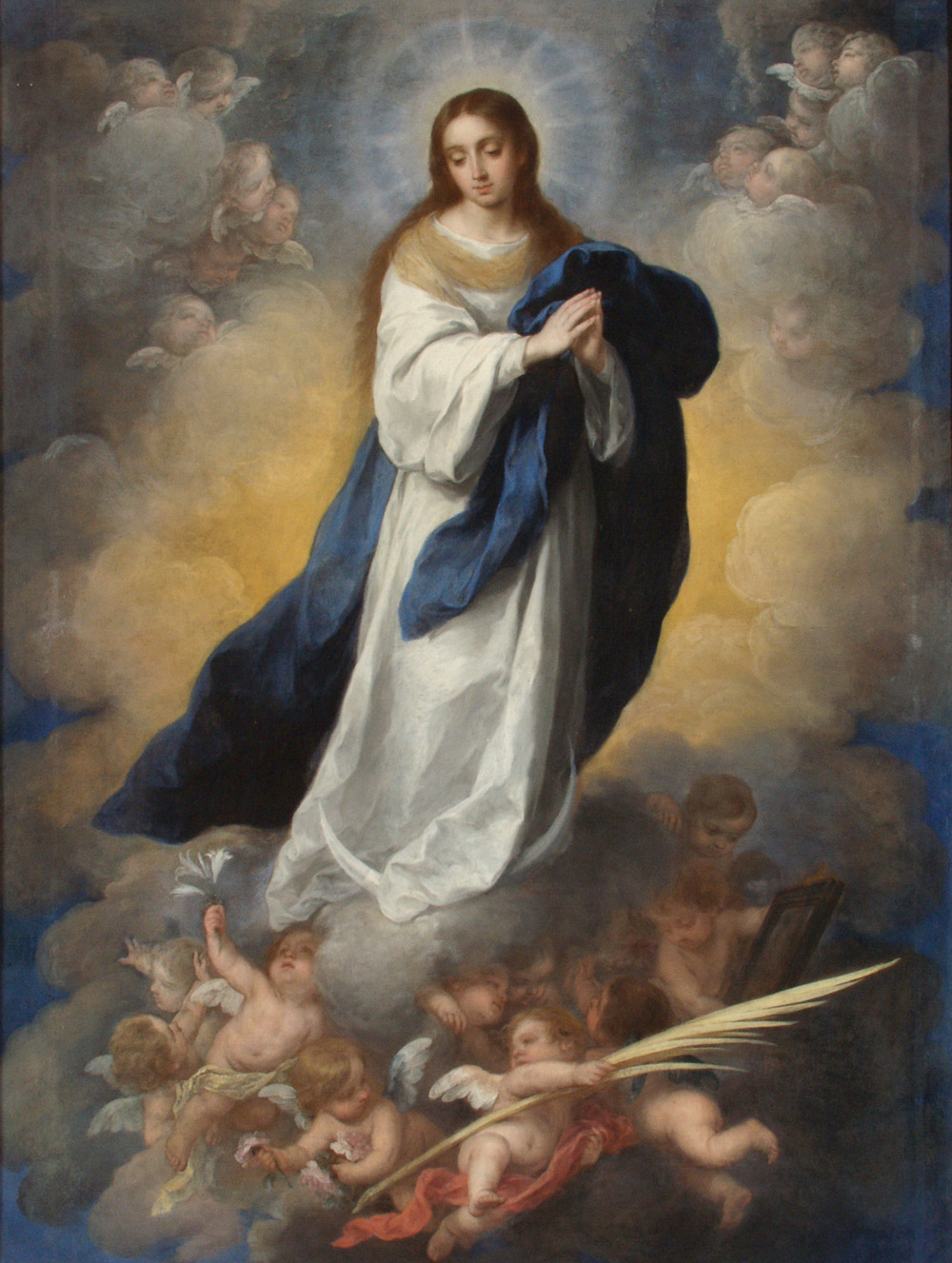
The Immaculate Conception of the Blessed Virgin Mary (1678) by Bartolomé Esteban Murillo

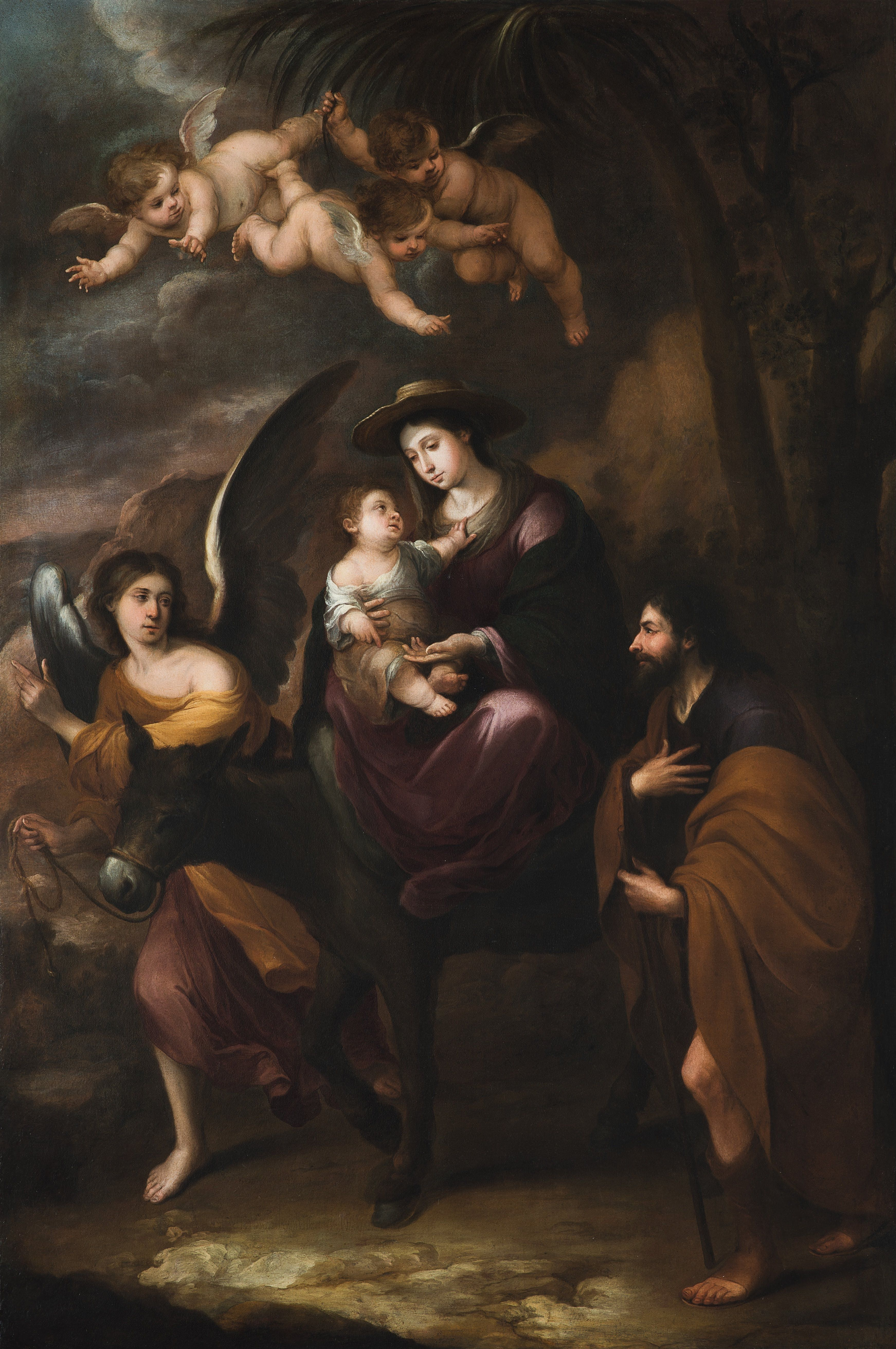
The Flight into Egypt (between 1660 and 1700) by Matías de Arteaga y Alfaro

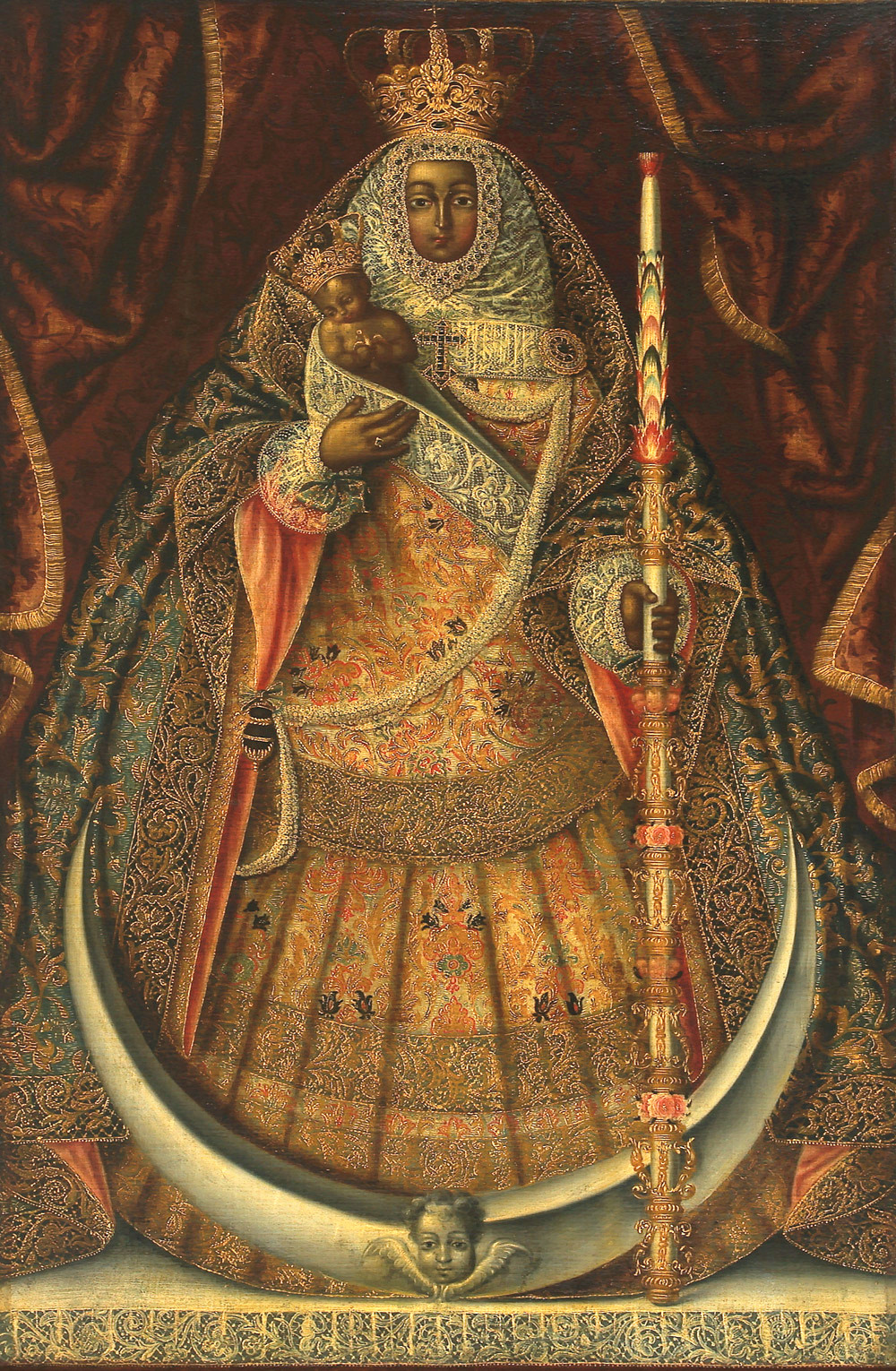
Virgin of Candelaria (c. 1700-1725) by Cristóbal Hernández de Quintana

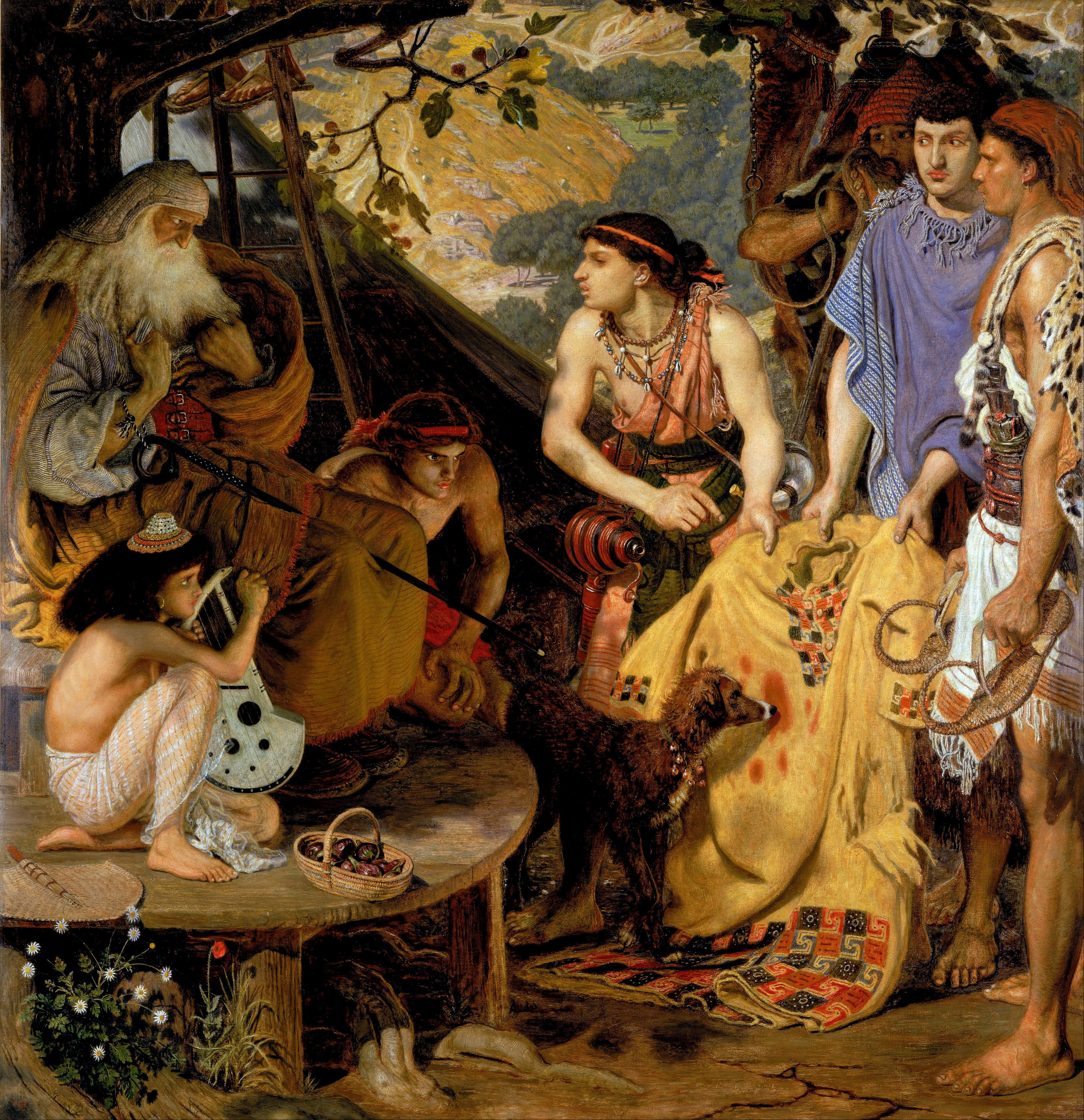
Brown's Jacob and Joseph's Coat (1864) by Ford Madox Brown

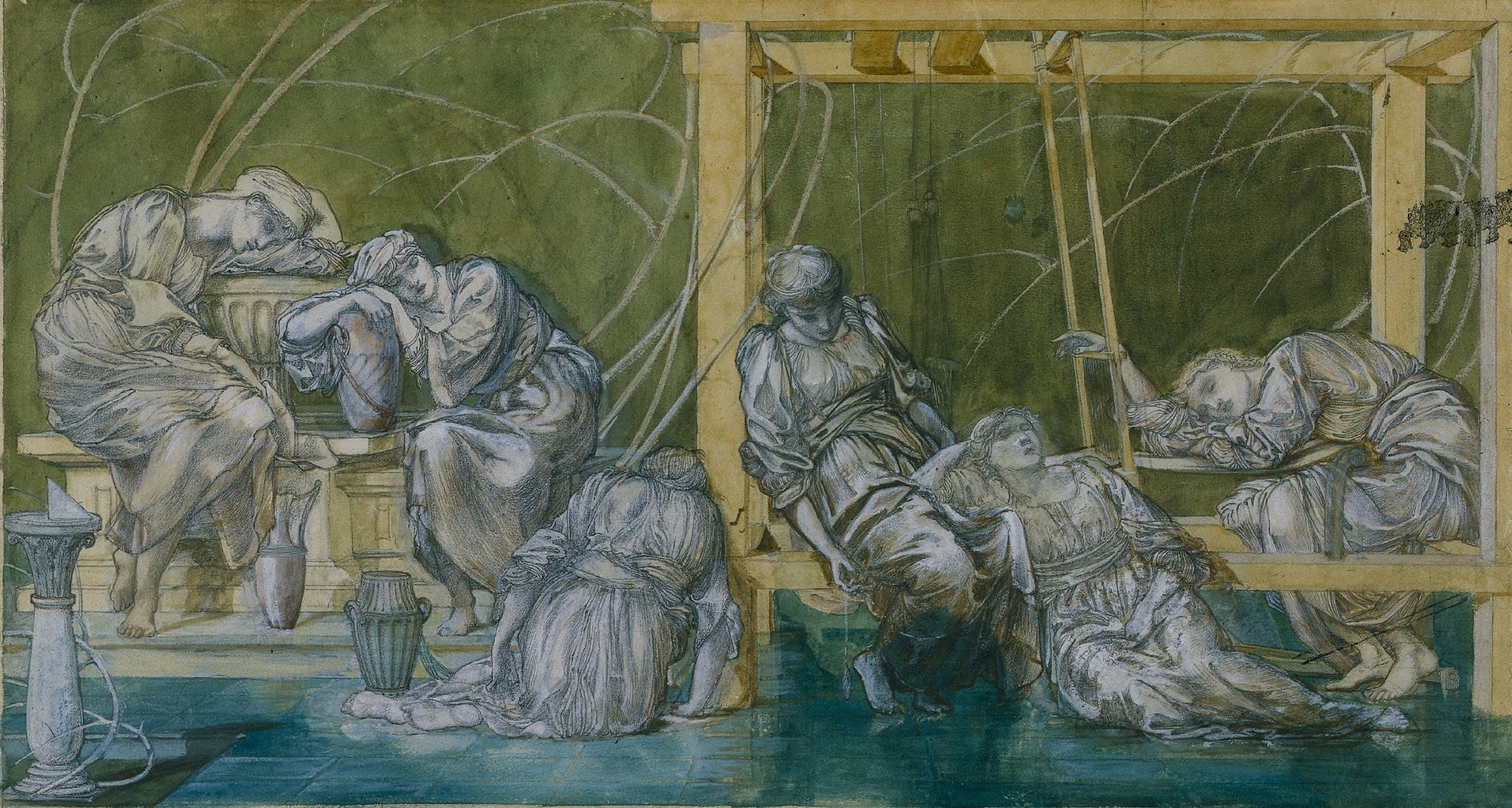
The Garden Court (1870) by Edward Burne-Jones

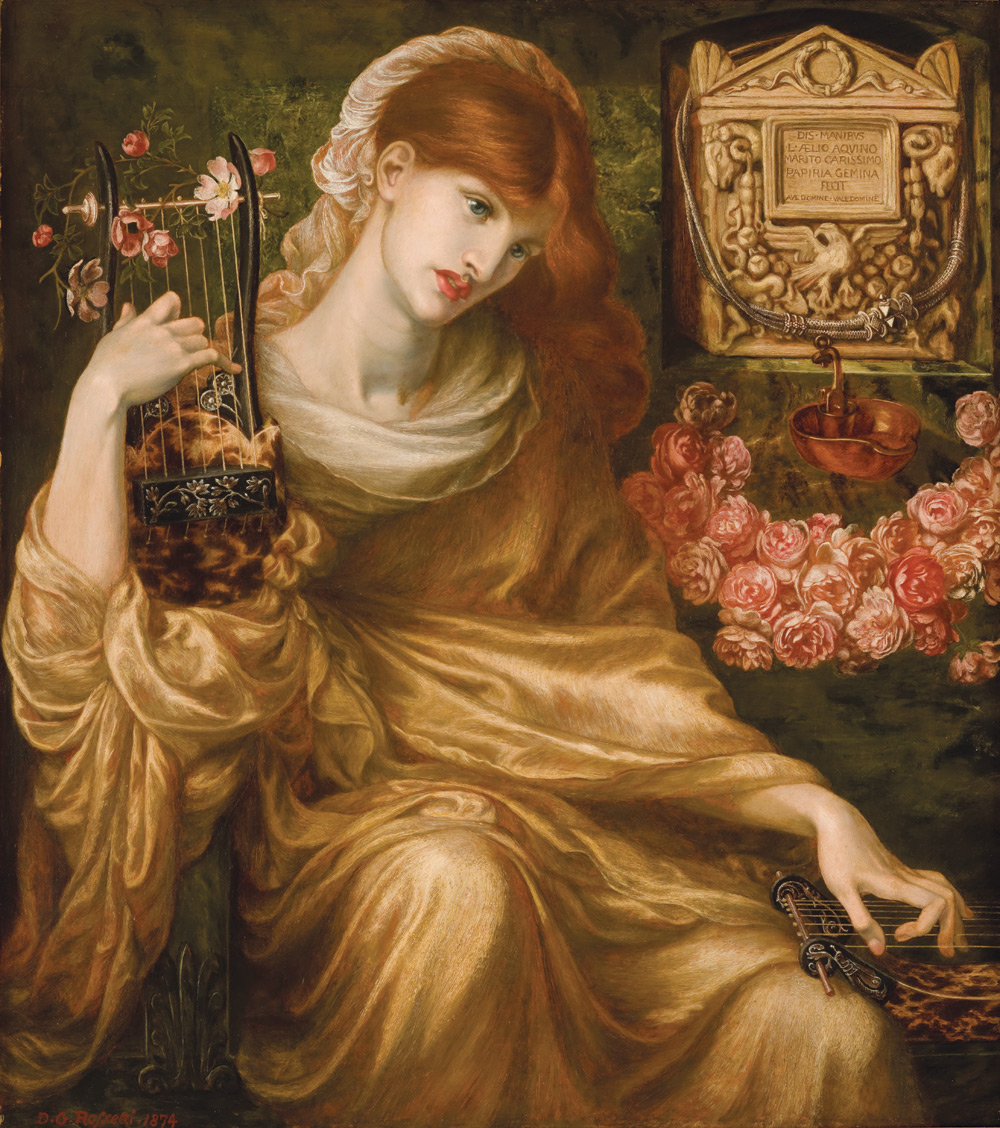
Roman Widow (1874) by Dante Gabriel Rossetti

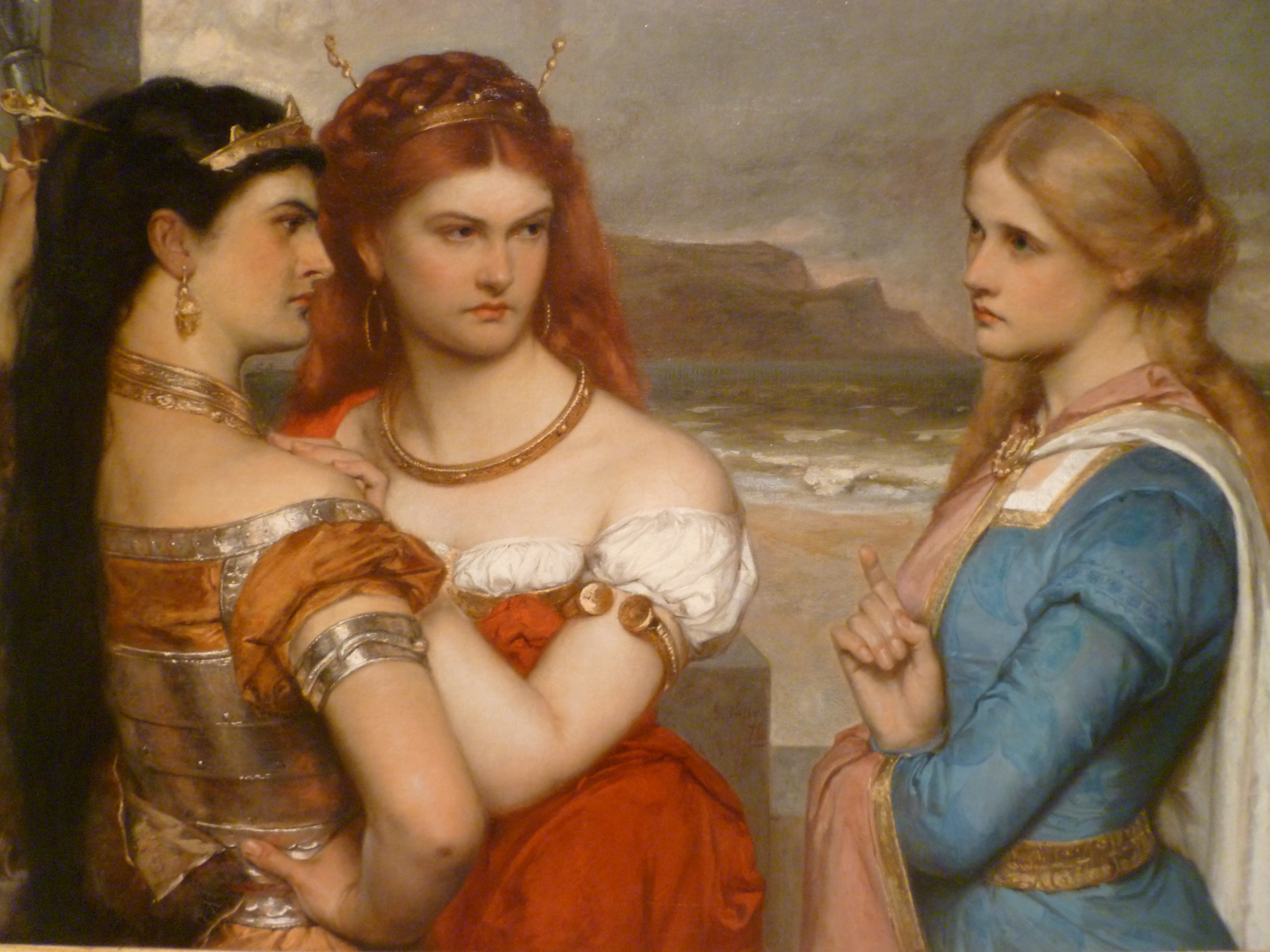
The Three Daughters of King Lear (c. 1875-1876) by Gustav Pope

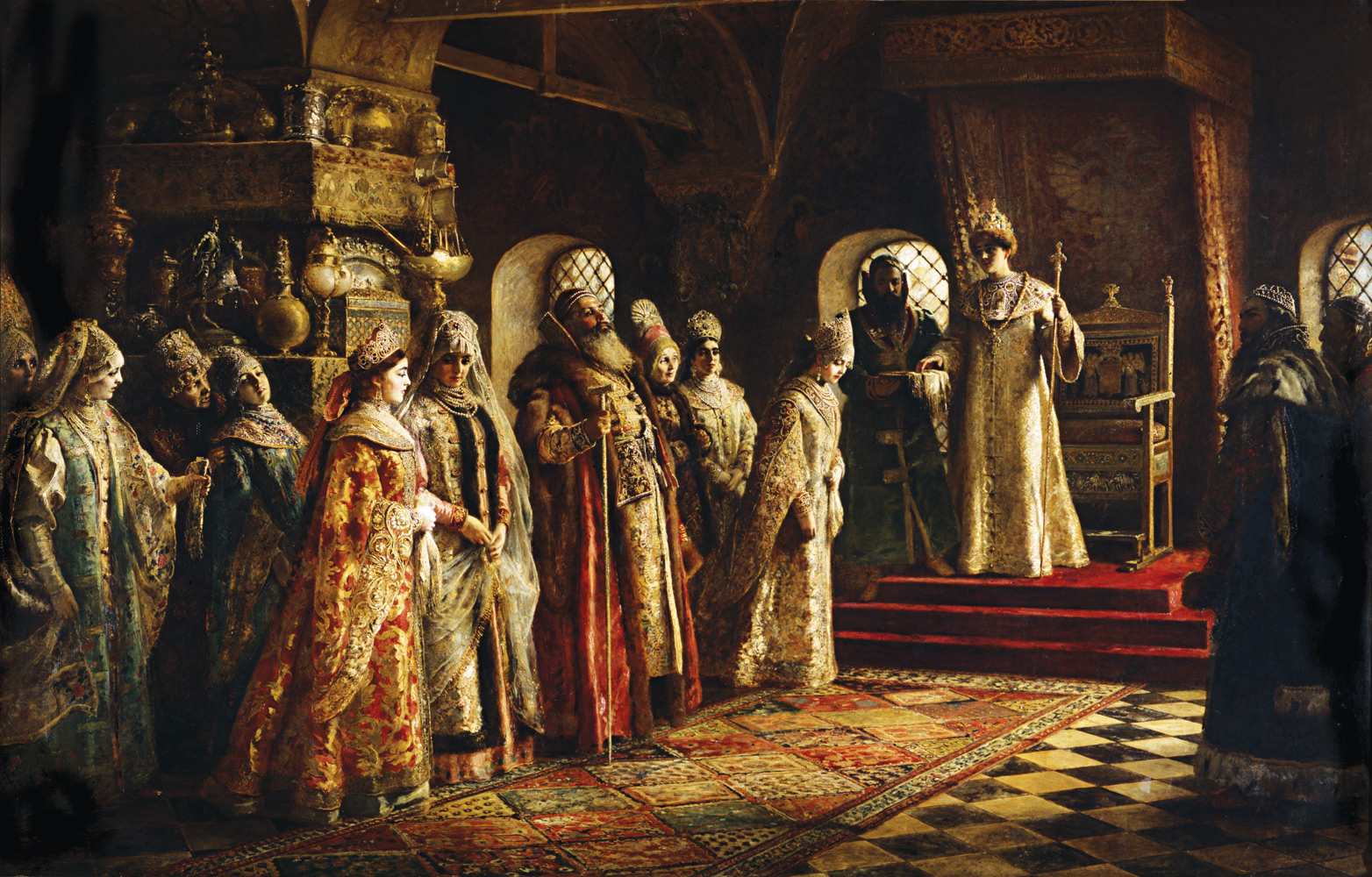
The Bride-Show of Tsar Alexis of Russia (1887) by Konstantin Makovsky

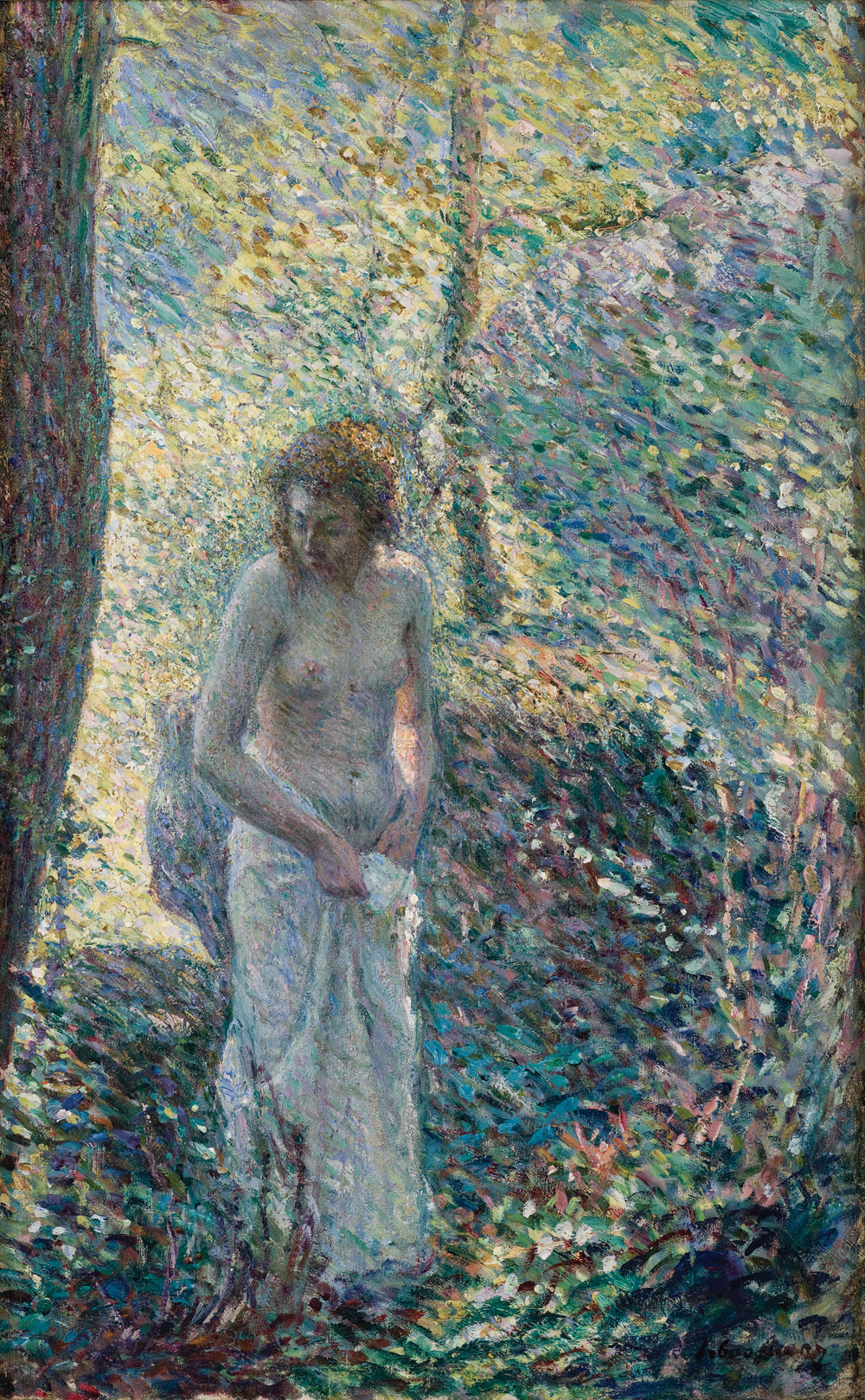
Una joven en el bosque (1897) by Henri Lebasque

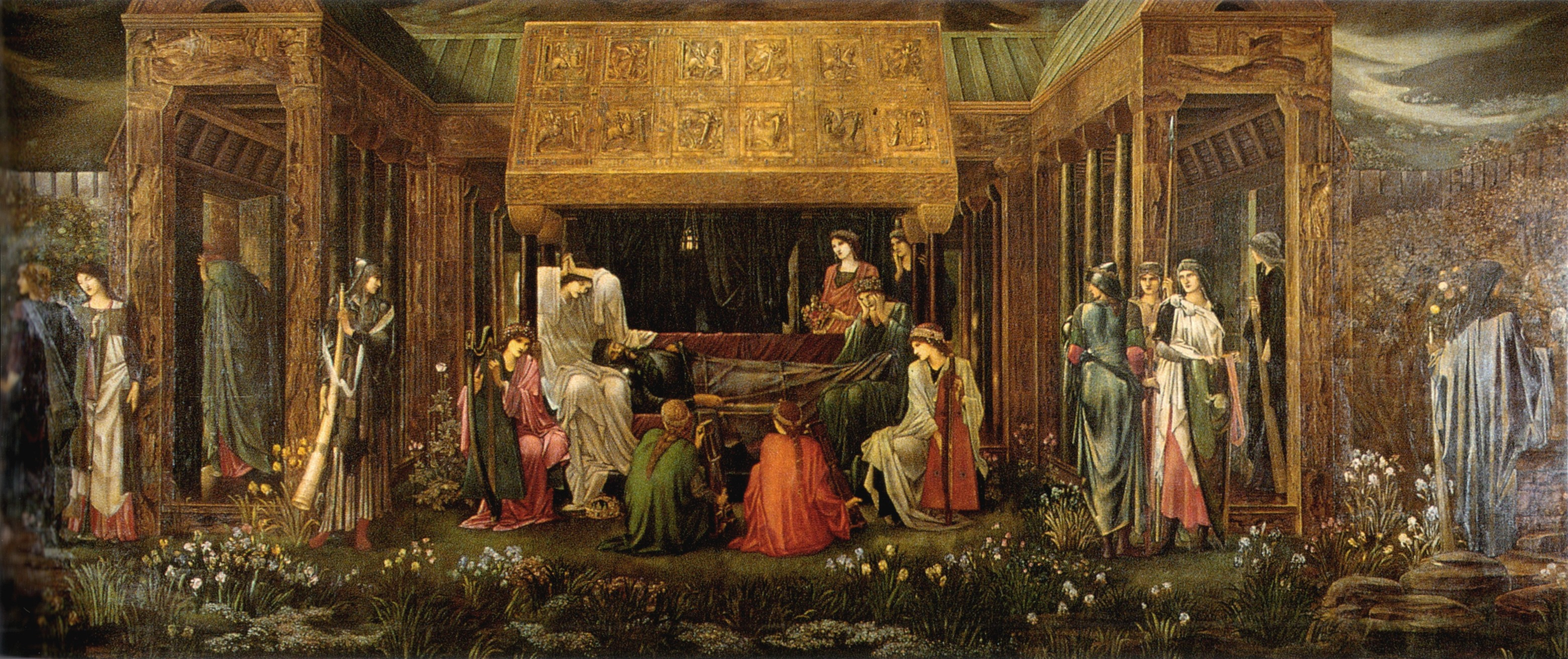
The Last Sleep of Arthur in Avalon (c. 1881-1898) by Edward Burne-Jones

== See also ==
- Puerto Rico Museum of Contemporary Art
