= Nicola Lake =

Lake in British Columbia

- Location within British Columbia
- Location: British Columbia
- Coordinates: 50°10′N 120°31′W
- Primary inflows: Nicola River
- Basin countries: Canada
- Average depth: 24 m (79 ft)
- Max. depth: 55 m (180 ft)
- Surface elevation: 628 m (2,060 ft)

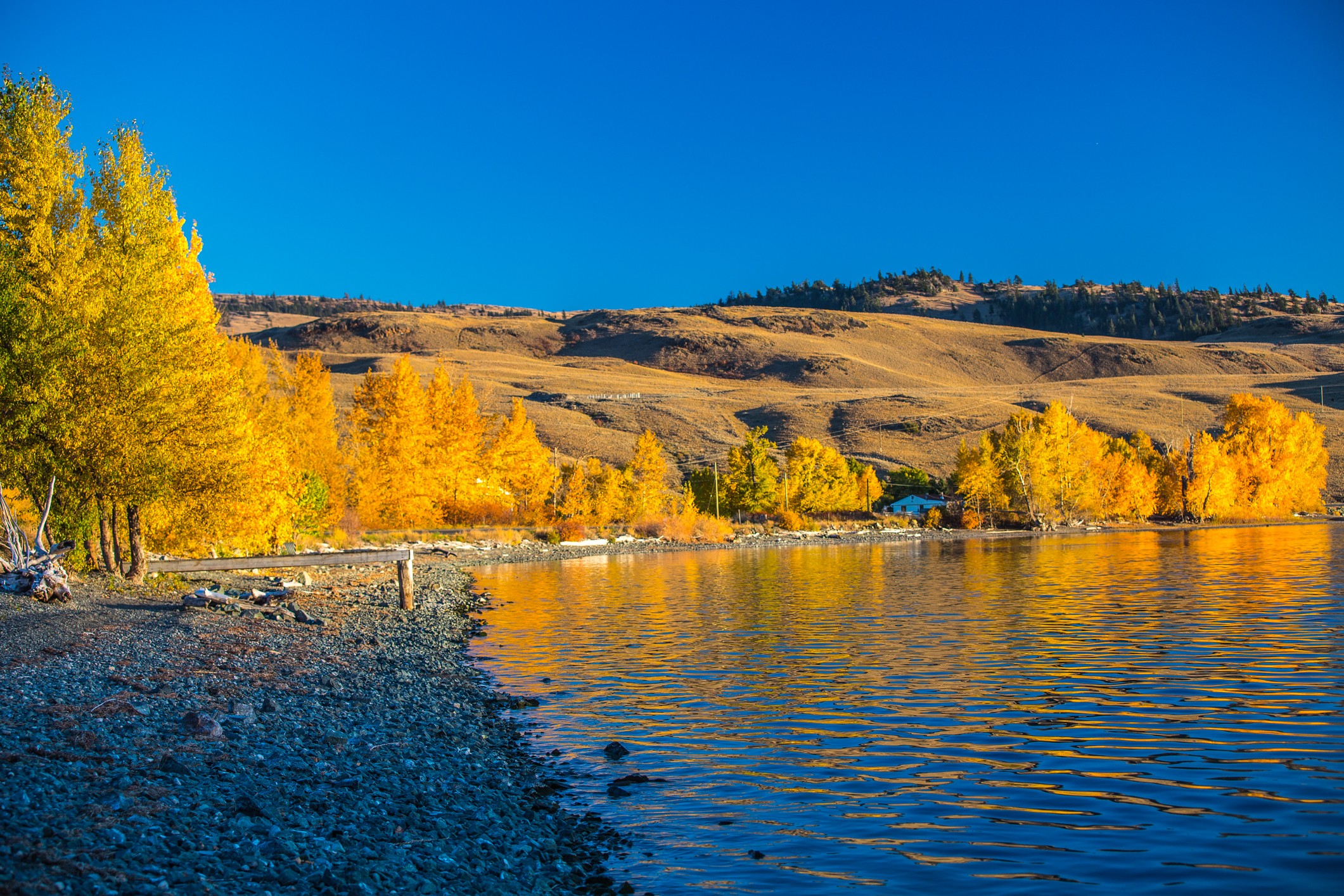

Nicola Lake named for Nicola (Okanagan leader) is a glacially formed narrow, deep lake located in the South-Central Interior of British Columbia, Canada approximately thirty kilometres northeast of the city of Merritt. It was a centrepoint of the first settlements in the grasslands lying south of Kamloops, and today is used for recreation and as a water storage site to provide irrigation and water flows to fisheries downstream in the Nicola River. The lake is important in the history of the local Nicola people as the location of one of their major communities, Nicola Lake Indian Reserve No. 1, which lies on its eastern shore and is the home of the Upper Nicola Indian Band. Many of the band work for the Douglas Lake Cattle Company, aka the Douglas Lake Ranch, whose headquarters are also adjacent to the lake.

== Geography ==
Located at an elevation of 628 metres above sea level, Nicola Lake is a widening of the Nicola River system as it flows from the plateau south of Kamloops and northwest of the Nicola Rocks Valley. It is approximately 22 kilometres in length and has a general northeast-to-southwest lay, curving along its length. The lake has a mean depth of approximately 24 metres, with a maximum of 55 metres. The Nicola Valley is narrow and mountainous, generating substantial winds that have given the lake a good reputation among sailors and windsurfers.

The lake is a short drive from Merritt on provincial Highway 5A, formerly the main route into the B.C. Interior but replaced in the 1980s by the Coquihalla Highway system. This highway runs along the southeast/east side of the lake, through the communities of Quilchena and Nicola. The Nicola River flows into the lake just north of Quilchena, and exits through the Nicola Dam at the south end, just north of Nicola.

== Recreational Use ==
Being roughly three hours from Vancouver and in a temperate climate that sees warm weather for much of the year (despite a severe high-country winter), Nicola Lake has become popular among those looking for recreation. Monck Provincial Park is located on the shores of the lake, at a site used in centuries past as a First Nations village (depressions, known as quiggly holes, from the local type of indigenous pit house, are still evident). Camping, boating, and swimming are available at the park. Nicola Lake is a popular location for fishing as well, with rainbow trout and Kokanee the main species sought by fishermen. Burbot also populate the lake. Burbot must be released when caught by fishermen in Nicola Lake. The winds that blow through its narrow valley have made Nicola Lake a destination for sailors and windsurfers. The Kamloops Sailing Association operates a facility at Quilchena that was originally constructed for the 1993 Canada Games sailing events, and today provides a location for club members and guests to sail, as well as lessons for new sailors. A pullout along Highway 5A is a popular launch site for windsurfers taking advantage of the wind. It was dedicated as a memorial to a local windsurfer several years ago.

== Water Concerns ==
As part of the Nicola watershed locally and the Thompson River basin on a wider scale, Nicola Lake is a link in British Columbia's salmon life cycle. Because of generally declining water levels in the Interior, the lake, controlled by the dam at its outflow, provides necessary flows through the summer for vulnerable coho salmon and other species downstream. Some organizations have expressed concern about the water flows, and there is ongoing discussion about management of the dam, completion of the dam project (dredging of the inflow area being a key concern) as well as water supplies in the entire watershed.

== See also ==
- List of lakes of British Columbia
- Nicola
- Nicola River
- Nicola Athapaskans
- Nicola Country
