= Monck Provincial Park =

Provincial park in British Columbia, Canada

- IUCN category II (national park)
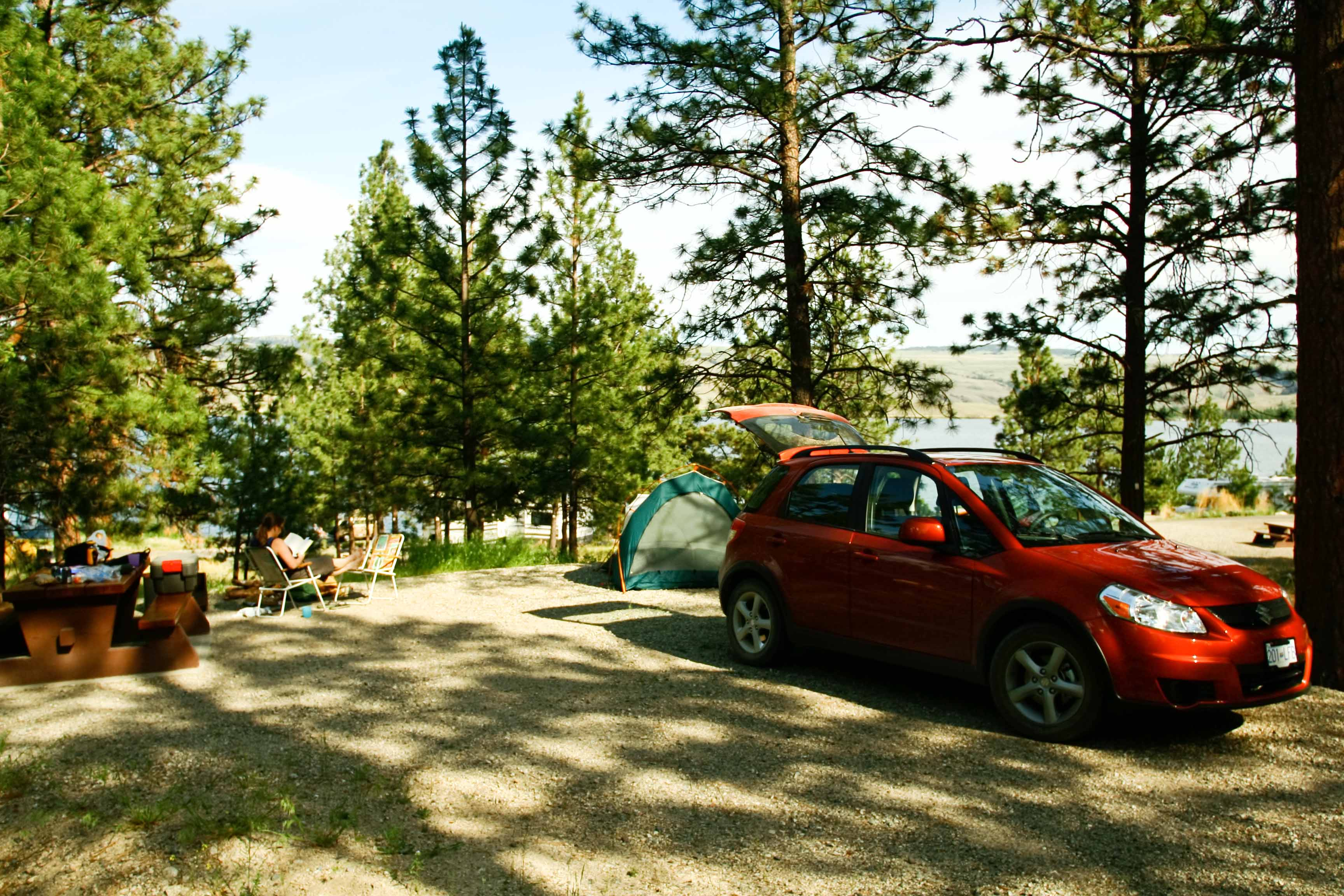
- Campsite

- Location within British Columbia
- Interactive map of Monck Provincial Park
- Location: British Columbia, Canada
- Nearest city: Merritt
- Coordinates: 50°10′37″N 120°32′15″W
- Area: 1.18 km^{2} (0.46 sq mi)
- Established: September 28, 1951
- Governing body: BC Parks

Monck Provincial Park is a provincial park in British Columbia, Canada, located at Nicola Lake near the town of Merritt. The park's campground is one of those which accepts reservations. Activities including fishing, camping and hiking. Natural features other than Nicola Lake include lava beds associated with the Chilcotin Group.
