= Quilchena =

- Location of Quilchena in British Columbia
- Coordinates: 50°10′00″N 120°30′00″W
- Country: Canada
- Province: British Columbia
- Area codes: 250, 778

Quilchena (Thompson: q̓əłmíx, Okanagan: N̓łəqiłmlx̌) is an unincorporated community located on the south shore of Nicola Lake near the city of Merritt, British Columbia, Canada in that province's Nicola Country region. On the former main route between Merritt and Kamloops, it is now largely bypassed since the construction of the Coquihalla Highway. A heritage hotel is the main landmark, lately transformed into a small golf resort.
