= List of Chinook Jargon place names =

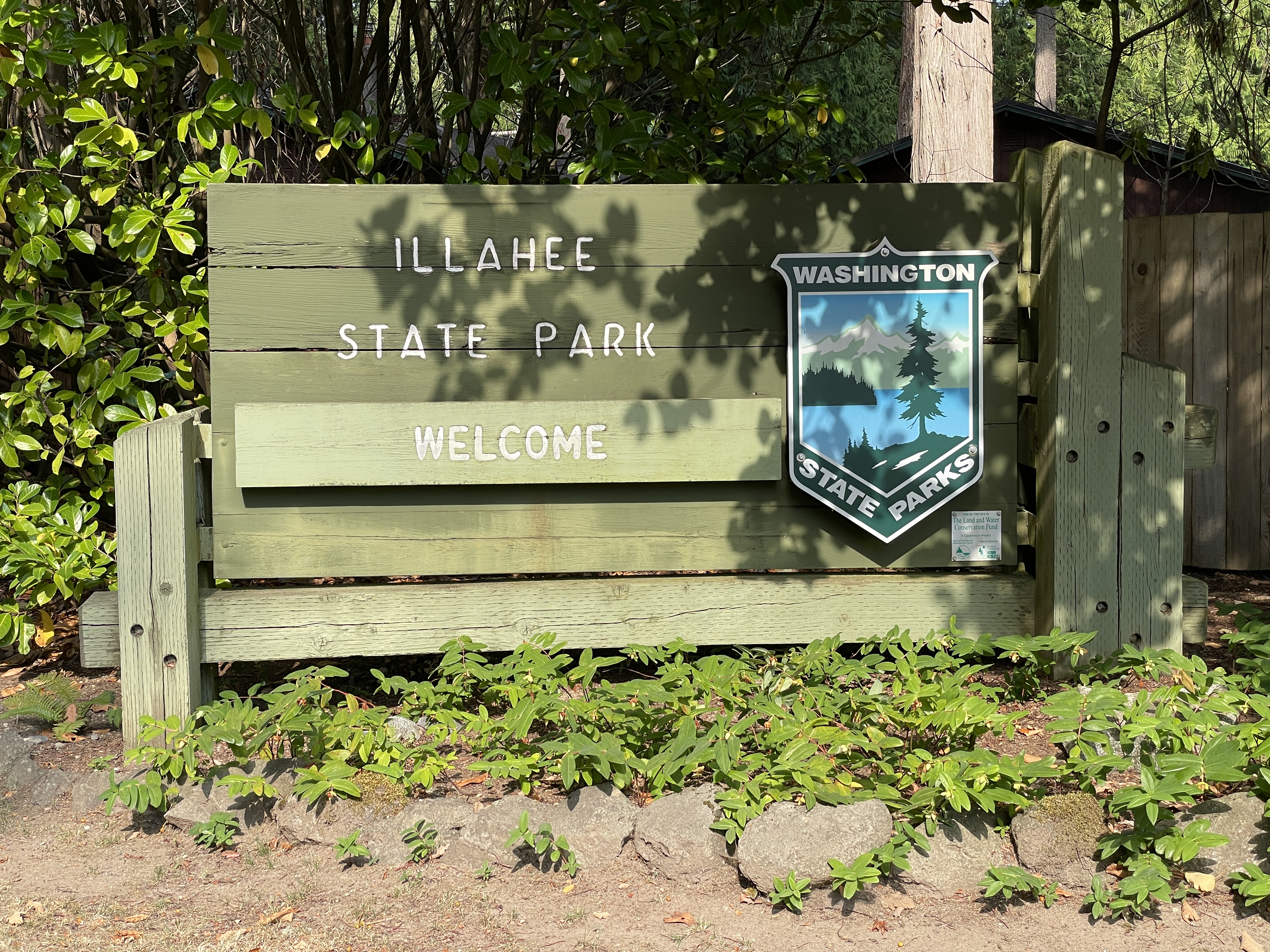
Illahee means 'land' or 'earth' in Chinook Jargon

Terms from Chinook Jargon, a regional trade language of the Pacific Northwest, have been used as place names since contact between Europeans and Indigenous people began in the late-18th and early-19th centuries. Anthropologist Douglas Deur has described the "toponymic complex" of Chinook Jargon place names as "perhaps the most extensive ... in North America." The language includes words from both the Indo-European languages of settlers, primarily English and French, as well as Native Pacific Northwest languages, primarily the Chinookan and Salishan language families. While many place names date to the contact period, others were bestowed later by government agencies like the United States Forest Service. Others are a hybrid, with an earlier contact-era Chinook Jargon name combined with a later, English addition. Spelling in Chinook Jargon, outside of its contemporary use at the Confederated Tribes of the Grand Ronde reservation, has never been standardized, resulting in wide variability both across and within eras and regions.

The following is an incomplete listing of place names derived from Chinook Jargon, generally found in the Canadian provinces of British Columbia and Alberta, the Canadian Yukon Territory and the U.S. states of Alaska, Washington, Oregon, Idaho, and Montana. Some outliers exist in California, Utah, Nevada, the Canadian Prairies and the Great Plains States, and as far east as Michigan, Ontario, Quebec and New Hampshire; those in the Prairies or Plains and Ontario or Quebec may be assumed to have been "carried" there in the contact era by fur traders.

Note: multiples entries of the same name are sorted in alphabetical order by state or province.

== A ==
Placename	Meaning	County or Region	State/Province	Type	USGS Quad or NTS topo	Latitude	Longitude	Comments
Alki	"soon", "the future"	West Seattle, King	WA	neighborhood	Duwamish Head	47.576°N	122.409°W	The earliest American settlers in the Seattle area called their settlement "New York Alki." "Alki" is the state motto of Washington.
Alki Beach	"	West Seattle, King	WA	beach	Duwamish Head	47.579°N	122.409°W	
Alki Creek	"	St. Mary Lake, W of Cranbrook	BC	stream	82F/9	49°36′57″N	116°12′58″W	
Alki Creek	"	near Dawson City	YT	stream	116B/2	64°03′55″N	138°59′15″W	
Alkie Creek	"	Tatshenshini-Alsek	BC	stream	114P/11	59°41′33″N	137°12′55″W	
Alki Crest	"	Pierce	WA	summit	Golden Lakes	46.964°N	121.893°W	
Alki Elementary	"	King	WA	school	Duwamish Head	47.578°N	122.406°W	
Alki Point	"	West Seattle, King	WA	cape	Duwamish Head	47.576°N	122.419°W	
Alki Point Lighthouse	"	West Seattle, King	WA	locale	Duwamish Head	47.574°N	122.418°W	

== B ==
Placename	Meaning	County or Region	State/Province	Type	USGS Quad or NTS topo	Latitude	Longitude	Comments
Big Mowich Mountain	mowich means "deer"	Harney	OR	summit	Big Mowich Mountain	43.952°N	119.564°W	also indexed under "M"
Big Mowich Reservoir	"	Grant	OR	reservoir	Suplee Butte	44.224°N	119.608°W	also indexed under "M"
Big Skookum	see Skookum	Mason	WA	inlet		47°12′20″N	123°01′01″W	More commonly called Hammersley Inlet today. See also Little Skookum.
Boston Bar	"American" (as opposed to British which was "King George")	Fraser Canyon	BC	community & bar	92H/14	49°51′58″N	121°26′31″W	also Boston Bar Indian Reserves nos. 1A, 8, 9, 11. "Bar" means sandy riverbank.
Boston Bar Creek	"	Coquihalla River, Canadian Cascades	BC	stream	92H/6	49°29′18″N	121°12′41″W	
Boston Bay	"	Comox Lake	BC	bay	92H/6	49°38′0″N	125°8′0″W	
Boston Bluff	"	Klamath	OR	cliff	Devils Peak	42.678°N	122.226°W	
Boston Brook	"	Shoshone	ID	stream	Steamboat Creek	47.719°N	116.209°W	
Boston Canyon	"	Umatilla	OR	valley	Gibbon	45.684°N	118.362°W	
Boston Creek	"	Comox Lake	BC	stream	92H/6	49°38′10″N	125°8′2″W	
Boston Drain	"	Malheur	OR	canal	Vale West	43.932°N	117.319°W	
Boston Flats	"	Cache Creek-Ashcroft junction	BC	locality & flat	92I/14	50°45′57″N	121°18′40″W	
Boston Gulch	"	Boise	ID	valley	Placerville	43.896°N	115.902°W	
Boston Harbor	"	Thurston	WA	bay	Squaxin Island	47.142°N	122.902°W	
Boston Harbor	"	Thurston	WA	town/city	Squaxin Island	47.139°N	122.900°W	also Boston Harbor Elementary School
Boston Hill	"	NE of Red Deer	AB	summit	83A/6	52°28′00″N	113°26′00″W	Alberta location code 29 and 30-40-24-W4; presumably of Chinook origin, but possibly not
Boston Horse Camp	"	Malheur	OR	locale	Brogan	44.128°N	117.608°W	
Boston Islands	"	Wales Island, Tongass Pass/Chatham Sound	BC	islands	103J/10	54°42′0″N	130°34′0″W	
Boston Lake	"	N of Comox Lake	BC	islands	92F/11	49°39′3″N	125°12′44″W	source of Boston Creek
Boston Mills (historical)	"	Linn	OR	locale	Halsey	44.461°N	123.081°W	
Boston Mills Post Office (historical)	"	Linn	OR	locale	Halsey	44.461°N	123.081°W	
Boston Mountain	"	Idaho	ID	summit	Boston Mountain	45.646°N	115.188°W	
Boston Mountain Lake	"	Idaho	ID	lake	Boston Mountain	45.642°N	115.181°W	
Boston Point	"	Cook Channel, Nootka Island, Nootka Sound	BC	cape	92e/10	49°39′376″N	126°36′53″W	
Boston Point	"	Jefferson	WA	cape	Brinnon	47.665°N	122.903°W	
Boston Ridge	"	N side Comox Lake	BC	ridge	92F/11	49°38′18″N	125°11′53″W	flanks Boston Creek
Boston Sink	"	Crook	OR	flat	Hardin Ranch	43.882°N	119.926°W	
Boston Tunnel	"	Grant	OR	mine	Granite	44.864°N	118.389°W	

== C ==
Placename	Meaning	County or Region	State/Province	Type	USGS Quad or NTS topo	Latitude	Longitude	Comments
Chack Chack Lake	"bald eagle"	Desolation Sound	BC	lake	92F/9	49°41'00"	124°09'00"	"Named after L.H. Roberts of Nelson Island, whose Indian name is Chack-chak (the Chinook Jargon word for "bald eagle")"
Chako Creek	"come", "become"	Lane	OR	stream	Groundhog Mountain	43.519°N	122.284°W	
Chickaman Gulch	"metal, ore"	Missoula	MT	valley	Carlton Lake	46.746°N	114.193°W	usually spelled "chikamin" or "chickaman"
Chickaman Mine	"	Missoula	MT	mine	Blue Mountain	46.751°N	114.193°W	
Chikamin Bay	"metal, ore"	Chikamin Range, Hazelton Mountains	BC	bay	93E/7	53°28′00″N	126°56′0″W	
Chikamin Creek	"	Chikamin Range, Hazelton Mountains	BC	stream	93E/7	53°28′00″N	126°59′0″W	
Chikamin Creek	"	Chelan	WA	stream	Chikamin Creek	47.904°N	120.729°W	
Chikamin Creek	"	Grays Harbor	WA	stream	Mount Hoquiam	47.503°N	123.541°W	
Chikamin Creek	"	Snohomish	WA	stream	Glacier Peak West	48.033°N	121.198°W	
Chikamin Lake	"	Kittitas	WA	lake	Chikamin Peak	47.481°N	121.305°W	
Chikamin Mountain	"	Chikamin Range, Hazelton Mountains	BC	summit	93E/7	53°23′19″N	127°3′2″W	
Chikamin Peak	"	King	WA	summit	Chikamin Peak	47.480°N	121.315°W	
Chikamin Range	"	Hazelton Mountains	BC	range	93E/6	53°24′0″N	127°5′0″W	Tahtsa Lake;
Chikamin Ridge	"	Chelan	WA	ridge	Chikamin Creek	47.973°N	120.688°W	
Chikamin Ridge	"	Kittitas	WA	ridge	Chikamin Peak	47.458°N	121.293°W	
Chinook	see Chinook wind	Deer River, N of Brooks	AB	unincorporated area	72M/7	51°27′00″N	110°55′00″W	Alberta location code 4-29-7-W4
Chinook	"	Blaine	MT	town/city & locale	Chinook	48.590°N	109.231°W	also Chinook Alliance Church, Chinook Cemetery, Chinook Fire Department, Chinook Golf Club, Chinook High School, Chinook Police Department, Chinook Post Office
Chinook	see Chinook salmon	Pacific	WA	town/city	Chinook	46.273°N	123.944°W	
Chinook Bay Campground	see Chinook salmon	Custer	ID	locale	Stanley	44.159°N	114.912°W	
Chinook Bend	see Chinook salmon	Lincoln	ID	bend	Devils Lake	44.881°N	123.960°W	
Chinook Campground	see Chinook salmon	Idaho	ID	locale	Loon Lake	45.213°N	115.809°W	
Chinook Cove	see Chinook salmon	North Thompson River, N of Barriere	BC	unincorporated area	92P/1 and 92P/8	51°14′00″N	120°10′00″W	
Chinook Creek	see Chinook salmon	Matanuska-Susitna	AK	stream	Talkeetna Mountains D-5	62.803°N	149.163°W	
Chinook Creek	see Chinook wind	Wapiti River	AB	stream	83L/12	54°44′00″N	119°57′00″W	Alberta location code 66-13-W6
Chinook Creek	see Chinook salmon	North Thompson River, N of Barriere	BC	stream	92B/8	51°16′00″N	120°11′00″W	
Chinook Creek	see Chinook salmon	Pierce	WA	stream	Chinook Pass	46.800°N	121.558°W	
Chinook Creek	see Chinook salmon	Skamania	WA	stream	Bare Mountain	45.961°N	122.114°W	
Chinook Creek	"	Teslin Lake, near Carcross	YT	stream	105D/8	60°31P0621'00"N	134°13′00″W	
Chinook Elementary School	see Chinook salmon	King	WA	school	Auburn	47.290°N	122.180°W	
Chinook Elementary School	see Chinook wind and Chinook salmon	Cayuga	NY	locale	Fair Haven	43.317°N	76.718°W	
Chinook Jetty	see Chinook salmon	Pacific	WA	locale	Chinook	46.254°N	123.946°W	
Chinook, Lac	see Chinook wind	Riviere St.-Maurice, near La Tuque, Mauricie	QC	lake	31P/6	47°17′00″N	73°01′00″W	
Chinook, Lac du	"	Duhamel, Papineau	QC	lake	31J/3	46°00′00″N	75°16′00″W	
Chinook, Lac du	"	Riviere de Sault aux Cochons, near Lac-au-Brochet, La Haute-Côte-Nord	QC	lake	22F/4	49°03′00″N	69°51′00″W	
Chinook, Lac du	"	Lac-Ashuapmushuan, Le Domaine-du-Roy	QC	lake	32A/12	48°40′00″N	73°58′00″W	
Chinook Lake	see Chinook salmon	Flathead	MT	lake	Tally Lake	48.433°N	114.528°W	
Chinook Lake	"	Etamami River	SK	lake	63D/8	52°23′00″N	102°28′00″W	Saskatchewan location code 39-4-W2
Chinook Lake	"	Wapiti River	AB	lake	83L/12	54°38′00″N	119°56′00″W	Alberta location code 65-13-W6
Chinook Middle School	see Chinook salmon	King	WA	school	Clyde Hill	43.37°N	122.126°W	
Chinook Middle School	see Chinook salmon	King	WA	school	Kirkland	47.628°N	122.210°W	
Chinook Middle School	see Chinook salmon	King	WA	school	Des Moines	47.435°N	122.279°W	
Chinook Middle School	see Chinook salmon	Thurston	WA	school	Lacey	47.054°N	122.826°W	
Chinook Mountain	see Chinook salmon	Shuswap Highland, NE of Barriere	BC	summit	92P/8	51°18′00″N	120°07′00″W	
Chinook Mountain	see Chinook salmon	Valley	ID	summit	Chinook Mountain	44.733°N	115.352°W	
Chinook Park	see Chinook wind	Calgary	AB	unincorporated area	82J/16	50°59′00″N	114°05′00″W	
Chinook Park	see Chinook salmon	Josephine	OR	park	Grants Pass	42.429°N	123.259°W	
Chinook Pass	see Chinook	Yakima	WA	gap	Chinook Pass	46.872°N	121.514°W	
Chinook Pass Work Center	see Chinook	Yakima	WA	locale	Cliffdell	46.902°N	121.016°W	
Chinook Peak	see Chinook wind	Crowsnest Pass	AB	summit	82J/16	49°35′00″N	114°37′00″W	Alberta location code 27-5-7-W5
Chinook, Petit lac du	"	Riviere de Sault aux Cochons, near Lac-au-Brochet, La Haute-Côte-Nord	QC	lake	22F/4	49°04′00″N	69°51′00″W	
Chinook Point	see Chinook salmon	Pacific	WA	cape	Chinook	46.252°N	123.921°W	
Chinook Ridge	see Chinook Salmon	Wapiti River	AB/BC	summit	83L/12	54°39′00″N	120°00′00″W	
Chinook River	see Chinook salmon	Pacific	WA	cape	Chinook	46.302°N	123.971°W	
Chinook School	see Chinook salmon	Anchorage	AK	cape	Anchorage A-8 NW	61.142°N	149.937°W	
Chinook Valley	"	Peace River	AB	unincorporated area	83L/12	56°29′00″N	117°39′00″W	Alberta location code 24-86-24-W5
Chum Creek	"painted, marked"	Little Shuswap Lake	BC	stream	83L/13	50°51′54″N	119°35′52″W	Chum (sometimes spelled tzum often means the chum salmon - i.e. spotted salmon (or dog salmon), which may be the case here; given the location (near Chase) it could just as easily have to do with coloured stones, or availability of ochre or other pigments. Also Chum Creek Indian Reserve No. 2 at same location
Chum Lake	"	S of Little Shuswap Lake	BC	lake	83L/13	50°49′0″N	119°35′0″W	source of Chum Creek
Chum Point	"	Salmon Inlet	BC	lake	83L/13	49°39′12″N	123°37′57″W	at this location probably refers to salmon; the point opposite is Steelhead Point, and this is Salmon Inlet (an arm of Sechelt Inlet)
Chumstick	"painted/marked wood/tree"	Chelan	WA	town/city	Winton	47.688°N	120.638°W	possibly refers to a type of tree, or to the use of a particular type of wood or tree used as a paintbrush, or as a source of dye or paint.
Chumstick Creek	"	Chelan	WA	stream	Leavenworth	47.603°N	120.643°W	
Chumstick Mountain	"	Chelan	WA	summit	Chumstick Mountain	47.651°N	120.450°W	
Colchuck Glacier	"cold water" i.e. "ice"	Chelan	WA	glacier	Enchantment Lakes	47.480°N	120.839°W	Cole + chuck
Colchuck Lake	"	Chelan	WA	glacier	Enchantment Lakes	47.480°N		
Colchuck Lake Dam	"	Chelan	WA	dam	Enchantment Lakes	47.495°N	120.835°W	
Colchuck Pass	"	Chelan	WA	gap	Enchantment Lakes	47.481°N	120.819°W	
Colchuck Peak	"	Chelan	WA	summit	Enchantment Lakes	47.477°N	120.844°W	
Colchuck Trail	"	Chelan	WA	trail	Enchantment Lakes	47.498°N	120.838°W	
Cosho Peak	"hog, pig, swine"	Skagit	WA	summit	Mount Logan	48.589°N	120.926°W	from fr. le cochon; Cosho Peak is on Ragged Ridge, which also includes other Jargon-named peaks: Kimtah Peak, Katsuk Peak, Mesahchie Peak (q.v.)
Coxit Creek	"broken, shattered"	Okanogan	WA	stream	Coxit Mountain	48.692°N	119.757°W	Coxit is usually kokshut
Coxit Creek Trail (historical)	"	Okanogan	WA	trail	Coxit Mountain	48.688°N	119.799°W	
Coxit Mountain	"	Okanogan	WA	ridge	Coxit Mountain	48.690°N	119.843°W	
Cultus Bay	"bad, worthless, useless"	Island	WA	bay	Maxwelton	47.919°N	122.396°W	
Cultus Corral Horse Camp	"	Deschutes	OR	locale	Crane Prairie Reservoir	43.822°N	121.800°W	
Cultus Creek	"	Kootenay Lake	BC	stream	82F/7	49°20′0″N	116°48′0″W	35 km NW of Creston
Cultus Creek	"	Upper Elk River, Rocky Mountains	BC	stream	82J/7	50°30′0″N	114°59′0″W	85 km N of Sparwood
Cultus Creek	"	Thompson Plateau	BC	stream	92I/8	50°19′0″N	120°27′0″W	just north of Nicola Lake
Cultus Creek	"	Valley	ID	stream	Big Baldy	44.813°N	115.176°W	
Cultus Creek	"	Clackamas	OR	stream	Bedford Point	45.147°N	122.206°W	
Cultus Creek	"	Deschutes	OR	stream	Crane Prairie Reservoir	43.802°N	121.805°W	
Cultus Creek	"	Douglas	OR	stream	Red Butte	43.144°N	122.951°W	
Cultus Creek	"	Jefferson	OR	stream	Axehandle Butte	44.707°N	120.743°W	
Cultus Creek	"	Marion	OR	stream	Mother Lode Mountain	44.779°N	122.058°W	
Cultus Creek	"	Jefferson	WA	stream	Indian Pass	47.880°N	124.175°W	
Cultus Creek	"	Skamania	WA	stream	Sleeping Beauty	46.079°N	121.681°W	
Cultus Creek Campground	"	Skamania	WA	locale	Lone Butte	46.047°N	121.754°W	
Cultus Creek Station	"	Skamania	WA	locale	Lone Butte	46.047°N	121.754°W	
Cultus Hole	"	Yakima	WA	area	Fairview Ridge	46.479°N	121.127°W	
Cultus Lake	"	Chilliwack, Sardis	BC	community	92H/4	49°4′0″N	121°58′0″W	
Cultus Lake	"	Chilliwack, Sardis	BC	lake	92H/4	49°3′0″N	121°59′0″W	
Cultus Lake	"	Arrowstone Hills, Bonaparte Plateau	BC	lake	92I/14	50°52′0″N	121°3′0″W	15 km NW of Savona
Cultus Lake Park	"	Chilliwack, Sardis	BC	lake	92H/4	49°3′0″N	121°58′0″W	
Cultus Lake	"	Deschutes	OR	lake	Crane Prairie Reservoir	43.839°N	121.853°W	
Cultus Lake	"	Douglas	OR	lake	Deadman Mountain	43.119°N	122.960°W	
Cultus Lake	"	Skamania	WA	lake	Lone Butte	46.029°N	121.772°W	
Cultus Lake Recreation Site	"	Deschutes	OR	locale	Crane Prairie Reservoir	43.836°N	121.833°W	
Cultus Lake Resort	"	Deschutes	OR	locale	Crane Prairie Reservoir	43.829°N	121.837°W	
Cultus Lake Trail	"	Deschutes	OR	trail	Crane Prairie Reservoir	43.867°N	121.859°W	
Cultus Mountain	"	Deschutes	OR	summit	Crane Prairie Reservoir	43.819°N	121.869°W	
Cultus Mountain	"	Skagit	WA	summit	Sedro-Woolley South	48.425°N	122.141°W	
Cultus Mountain Reservoir	"	Skagit	WA	summit	Sedro-Woolley South	48.393°N	122.187°W	
Cultus Mountain Reservoir Dam A	"	Skagit	WA	dam	Sedro-Woolley South	48.395°N	122.188°W	
Cultus Mountain Reservoir Dam B	"	Skagit	WA	dam	Sedro-Woolley South	48.393°N	122.187°W	
Cultus Mountain Reservoir Dam C	"	Skagit	WA	dam	Sedro-Woolley South	48.387°N	122.185°W	
Cultus Mountains	"	Skagit	WA	range	Haystack Mountain	48.421°N	122.114°W	
Cultus North Shore Recreation Site	"	Skagit	WA	locale	Crane Prairie Reservoir	43.844°N	121.848°W	"North Shore" is or Cultus Lake on same quad
Cultus River	"	Deschutes	OR	stream	Crane Prairie Reservoir	43.772°N	121.803°W	
Cultus Sound	"	Hunter Island, Queen Charlotte Sound	BC	stream	102P/16	51°54′0″N	128°13′0″W	

== D ==
Placename	Meaning	County	State	Type	USGS Quad	Latitude	Longitude	Comments
Delate Creek	"straight"	Washington	WA	stream				
Delate Creek	"	Oregon	OR	stream				
Delate Creek	"	Idaho	ID	stream				
Delate Road	"	Poulsbo	WA	stream				

== E ==
Placename	Meaning	County	State	Type	USGS Quad	Latitude	Longitude	Comments
Eena Creek	"beaver"	Benewah	ID	stream	Emida	47.069°N	116.533°W	
Ecola Creek	"whale"	Grant	OR	stream	Tillamook Head	45.918°N	123.98°W	Named by William Clark of the Lewis and Clark Expedition for a beached whale found there; typically spelled ehkoli or ikoli in Chinook Jargon
Ecola State Park	"	Grant	OR	state park	Tillamook	45.918°N	123.98°W	

== H ==
Placename	Meaning	County or Region	State/Province	Type	USGS Quad or NTS topo	Latitude	Longitude	Comments
Hiyu Creek	"many", or "a party"	Fraser River, near confluence Bowron River	BC	stream	93I/4	54°0′59″N	121°45′47″W	
Hyak	"fast", or "hurry up"	Kittitas	WA	town/city	Snoqualmie Pass	47.393°N	121.392°W	
Hyak County Park	"	Benton	OR	park	Lewisburg	44.639°N	123.159°W	
Hyak Creek	"	Clallam	WA	stream	Slide Peak	47.925°N	123.964°W	
Hyak Creek	"	Kittitas	WA	stream	Snoqualmie Pass	47.400°N	121.405°W	
Hyak Junior High School	"	King	WA	school	Mercer Island	47.604°N	122.169°W	
Hyak Lake	"	Kittitas	WA	lake	Snoqualmie Pass	47.393°N	121.421°W	
Hyak Shelter	"	Clallam	WA	locale	Slide Peak	47.924°N	123.971°W	
Hyak Mountain	"fast", or "hurry up"	Purcell Mountains, near Argenta-Lardeau	BC	summit	82K/1	50°15′00″N	116°26′00″W	
Hyas	"big, great, important"	near Norquay	SK	town	62M/16	51°54′00″N	102°16′00″W	
Hyas Creek	"	Clallam	WA	stream	Reade Hill	47.960°N	124.256°W	
Hyas Lake	"	E of Mount Lolo, Shuswap Highland, near confluence Bowron River	BC	lake	82L/13	50°47′50″N	119°57′58″W	c. 30 km ENE of Kamloops, British Columbia
Hyas Lake	"	Kitsap	WA	lake	The Cradle	47.567°N	121.119°W	
Hyas Lake	"	Kittitas	WA	lake	Mount Daniel	47.575°N	121.128°W	
Hyas Lake	"	Skagit	WA	lake	Huckleberry Mountain	48.366°N	121.362°W	
Hyas Lookout	"	Clallam	WA	locale	Indian Pass	47.981°N	124.133°W	

== I ==
Placename	Meaning	County or region	State or Province	Type	USGS Quad or NTS topo	Latitude	Longitude	Comments
Ikt Butte	"one"	Deschutes	OR	summit		43.858°N	121.276°W	Lava Cast Forest
Ikt Glacier	"	Tatshenshini-Alsek	BC	glacier	114P/6			Moxt Glacier ("two"), Kloon Glacier ("three"), Lahkit Glacier ("four"), Kwinnum Glacier ("five"), Taghum Glacier ("six"), Sinnamoxt Glacier ("seven"), Stotekin Glacier ("eight") are nearby
Ikt Lake	"	nr Ocean Falls	BC	lake	93D/5			Mokst Lake (from "two") is immediately upstream
Illahee	"land, grassland"	Curry	OR	community				
Illahee	"	Kitsap	WA	community				The state park of the same name is nearby
Illahee Meadows	"	Bonaparte Plateau	BC	flat	92P/3	51°10′0″N	121°17′0″W	22 km NE of Clinton, British Columbia
Illahee State Park	"	Kitsap	WA	park	Bremerton East	47°35'49"N	122°35'55"W	An unincorporated community with the same name is nearby
Illahee Xing	"	Marion	OR	overpass				Named overpass S of Salem, OR crossing Interstate 5
Inati Creek	"across"	Parsnip Reach, Williston Lake	BC	stream	93O/12	55°44′22″N	123°31′23″W	
Ipsoot Butte	"hidden"	Klamath	OR	summit	Spring Butte	43.553°N	121.354°W	
Ipsoot Creek	"hidden"	Rutherford Creek, W of Pemberton and N of Whistler	BC	stream	92P/8	51°15′56″N	120°10′37″W	there are two Ipsoot Creeks coming of the Ipsoot Glacier, this one on the NE flank of the Ipsoot massif, the other on its south. This one comes from the main toe of the Ipsoot Glacier.
Ipsoot Creek	"hidden"	Lillooet River, NW of Pemberton	BC	stream	92J/7	50°17′6″N	on S flank of Ipsoot massif	
Ipsoot Creek	"	Latah	ID	stream	Sand Mountain	46.928°N	116.542°W	
Ipsoot Glacier	"	Pemberton Icecap-Rutherford Creek	BC	glacier	92J/6	50°19′59″N	123°0′10″W	
Ipsoot Lake	"	Whatcom	WA	lake	Bacon Peak	48.713°N	1121.539°W	
Ipsoot Mountain	"	SE Pemberton Icecap-Rutherford Creek	BC	summit	92J/7	50°19′36″N	122°59′30″W	W of Pemberton, N of Whistler
Ipsut Creek	"	Pierce	WA	stream	Mowich Lake	46°58′47″N	121°40′56″W	

== K ==
Placename	Meaning	County or Region	State/Province	Type	USGS Quad or NTS topo	Latitude	Longitude	Comments
Kahkwa Creek	"like", "as", "similar to"	Jefferson	WA	stream	Indian Pass	47.881°N	124.248°W	
Kahkawa Lake	"similar to"	Upper Fraser Valley	BC	lake				
Kalahin Mountain	poss. var. of kullaghan — "fence, fenced enclosure"	Boundary Ranges, just S of Iskut River	BC	summit	104B/11	56°34′43″N	131°0′32″W	maybe Tahltan in origin
Kaleetan Peak	"arrow"	King	WA	summit	Snoqualmie Pass	47°27′45″N	121°48′42″W	
Kalitan Creek	"arrow", also means "shot-ball", i.e. for a musket, or "bullet"	Kitimat Ranges, Kitlope River basin	BC	stream	93E/4	53°03′10″N	127°48′55″W	pron. "Kuh-LIE-tun". see BCGNIS "Kalitan Creek" for more
Kalitan Peak			Three Sisters Wilderness	OR	south of S. Sister			
Kanaka Bar	"Hawaiian man"; see also Owyhee	Fraser Canyon	BC	bar & locality	92I/4	50°7′0″N	121°34′0″W	Kanaka is also name of CNR railway point here; also Kanaka Bar Indian Reserves 1A and 2; Kanaka Bar Tunnel on TransCanada Highway Kanaka Mountain is nearby
Kanaka Bar	"	Butte	CA	bar	Forbestown	39.601°N	121.317°W	more southerly Californian Kanaka placenames not necessarily Chinook in origin, could be direct into local English from Hawaiian
Kanaka Bar	"	Siskiyou	CA	bar	Badger Mountain	41.865°N	122.726°W	
Kanaka Bay	"	San Juan	WA	bay	False Bay	48.485°N	123.083°W	
Kanaka Bluff	"	W tip Portland Island, off Swartz Bay	BC	bluff	False Bay	48°43′32″N	123°23′12″W	SW of Fulford Harbour, Saltspring Island
Kanaka Cemetery	"	Siskiyou	CA	cemetery	Badger Mountain	41.864°N	122.722°W	
Kanaka Creek	"	Maple Ridge, just east of Haney	BC	stream & neighbourhood	92G/2	49°12′0″N	122°35′0″W	
Kanaka Creek	"	Butte	CA	stream	Stirling City	39.943°N	121.575°W	
Kanaka Creek	"	Butte	CA	stream	Forbestown	39.600°N	121.313°W	
Kanaka Creek	"	Shasta	CA	stream	Igo	40.542°N	122.532°W	
Kanaka Creek	"	Sierra	CA	stream	Pike	39.420°N	120.942°W	
Kanaka Creek	"	Siskiyou	CA	stream	Clear Creek	41.745°N	123.399°W	
Kanaka Creek	"	Tuolumne	CA	stream	Moccasin	37.844°N	120.356°W	
Kanaka Creek	"	Skamania	WA	stream	Bonneville Dam	45.696°N	121.876°W	
Kanaka Cutoff	"	Yolo	CA	canal	Knights Landing	38.768°N	121.637°W	
Kanaka Flat	"	San Diego	CA	flat	Julian	33.107°N	116.616°W	
Kanaka Glade	"	Lake	CA	flat	Hough Springs	39.207°N	122.579°W	
Kanaka Gulch	"	Amador	CA	valley	Amador City	38.422°N	120.813°W	
Kanaka Gulch	"	El Dorado	CA	valley	Georgetown	38.996°N	120.798°W	
Kanaka Gulch	"	Siskiyou	CA	valley	Sawyers Bar	41.300°N	123.220°W	
Kanaka Gulch	"	Jackson	OR	valley	Squaw Lakes	42.067°N	123.113°W	
Kanaka Hill Mine	"	Siskiyou	CA	mine	Clear Creek	41.744°N	123.399°W	
Kanaka Lake	"	Shuswap Highland, 12 km SE of Sicamous	BC	lake	82L/10	50°44′25″N	118°55′6″W	
Kanaka Lake	"	Tooele	UT	reservoir	Salt Mountain	40.562°N	112.744°W	
Kanaka Mine	"	Tuolumne	CA	mine	Groveland	37.870°N	120.161°W	
Kanaka Mountain	"	Canadian Cascades, Fraser Canyon	BC	summit	92I/3	50°6′57″N	121°29′11″W	near Kanaka Bar
Kanaka Peak	"	Butte	CA	summit	Forbestown	39.583°N	121.303°W	
Kanaka Peak	"	Shasta	CA	summit	Igo	40.562°N	122.554°W	
Kanaka Rapids	"	Gooding	ID	rapids	Thousand Springs	42.665°N	114.802°W	
Katsuk Butte	"middle", "in the middle of"	Deschutes	OR	summit	South Sister	44.017°N	121.756°W	
Katsuk Butte	"	Lane	OR	summit	Harvey Mountain	44.110°N	122.283°W	
Katsuk Creek	"	Thompson Canyon	BC	summit	92I/6	50°22′0″N	121°22′0″W	7 km SW of Spences Bridge, British Columbia
Katsuk Glacier	"	Skagit	WA	glacier	Mount Logan	48.583°N	120.895°W	
Katsuk Peak	"	Skagit	WA	summit	Mount Logan	48.579°N	120.887°W	Katsuk Peak is on Ragged Ridge, which also includes other Jargon-named peaks: Kimtah Peak, Cosho Peak, Mesahchie Peak (q.v.)
Keekwulee Falls	"down", "under", "below"	King	WA	waterfall	Snoqualmie Pass	47.4307°N	121.4532°W	often translated as "to fall down", but only true in verbal phrases
Kilpill Mountain	"hard blood", "hard red"	Murtle Lake, Shuswap Highland	BC	stream	104H/8	52°6′2″N	119°55′39″W	just south of Pillpill ("blood") Mountain; maybe adaptation of kull ("hard", "difficult") + pill ("red" or "blood")
Kimtah Glacier	"behind", "in back of"	Skagit	WA	glacier	Mount Logan	48.589°N	120.916°W	
Kimtah Peak	"	Skagit	WA	summit	Mount Logan	48.585°NN	120.909°W	Kimtah Peak is on Ragged Ridge, which also includes other Jargon-named peaks: Katsuk Peak, Cosho Peak, Mesahchie Peak (q.v.)
Kitling Peak	"kettle"	Washington	WA	mountain				
Kitling Creek	"kettle"	Washington	WA	stream				
Kettle Falls	"kettle"	Stevens	WA	town, waterfall				
Kettle River	"kettle"	Washington	WA, BC	river				
Kettle Valley	"kettle"	British Columbia	BC	town, rainroad				
Klahanie	"outside", "the outdoors"	King	WA	town/city	Vashon	47.431°N	122.435°W	
Klahanie Campground	"outside", "the outdoors"	Clallam	WA	locale	Reade Hill	47.964°N	124.304°W	
Klahhane Ridge	"	Clallam	WA	ridge	Mount Angeles	47.995°N	123.439°W	var. of klahanie
Klahn Creek	"wide"	Tillamook	OR	stream	Cedar Butte	45.554°N	123.676°W	klahn may not be Chinook, but possibly var. of klah
Klahowya Campground	equiv. to "hello", "howdy"	Clallam	WA	stream	Snider Peak	48.066°N	124.113°W	
Klahowya Creek	"	Spatsizi Plateau	BC	stream	104H/8	57°21′0″N	128°29′0″W	
Klahowya Creek	"	Pend Oreille	WA	stream	Gleason Mountain	48.508°N	117.054°W	
Klahowya Lake	"	Spatsizi Plateau	BC	lake	104H/8	58°19′0″N	128°24′0″W	source of Klahowya Creek
Klahowya Mountain	"	Purcell Mountains	BC	summit	82F/16	49°59′0″N	116°27′35″W	80 km NE of Nelson BC)
Klak Butte	"wide, open"	Deschutes	OR	summit	Pistol Butte	43.867°N	121.610°W	
Klak Creek	"	Bethel	AK	stream	Goodnews Bay D-5	59.786°N	160.756°W	
Klak Lake	"	Bethel	AK	lake	Goodnews Bay C-4	59.727°N	160.458°W	
Klipsan Beach	"sunset", variant of klip sun	Pacific	WA	populated place	Ocean Park	46.466°N	124.053°W	
Klonas Lake	"maybe" (der. from klone="three")	Sandell River, Rivers Inlet	BC	lake	92M/11	51°35′0″N	127°17′0″W	11 km S of Rivers Inlet, British Columbia
Klone Butte	"three"	Deschutes	OR	summit	Lava Cast Forest	43.815°N	121.277°W	
Klone Creek	"	Chelan	WA	stream	Pinnacle Mountain	48.188°N	120.663°W	
Klone Lakes	"	Grays Harbor	WA	lakes	Wynoochee Lake	47.474°N	123.542°W	
Klone Meadow	"	Chelan	WA	flat	Chikamin Creek	47.955°N	120.631°W	
Klone Peak	"	Chelan	WA	summit	Silver Falls	47.962°N	120.620°W	
Klooch, Mount	"woman, wife"	Hoonah–Angoon	AK	summit	Mount Fairweather C-4	58.609°N	137.270°W	
Kloochman Rock	"woman, wife"	Yakima	WA	summit	Tieton Basin	46.631°N	121.092°W	
Kloosh Creek	"good"	Nelson Range	BC	stream	82F/7	49°18′1″N	116°56′0″W	40 km NW of Creston, British Columbia)
Klootch Canyon	*from Klootchman — "woman, female"	Skeena	BC	canyon	103I/16	54°55′N	128°33′W	originally Klootchman Canyon
Klootch Mountain	"	Boundary	ID	summit	Priest Lake NE	48.720°N	116.756°W	
Klootchie Creek	"	Clatsop	OR	stream	Tillamook Head	45.911°N	123.882°W	
Klootchie Creek Campground	"	Clatsop	OR	locale	Tillamook Head	45.921°N	123.892°W	
Klootchlimmis Creek	"	Quatsino Sound	BC	stream	92L/5			"limmis" unknown meaning; possibly from Kwak'wala or Nuu-chah-nulth
Klootchman Canyon	"	Stikine River	BC	canyon	104G/12			
Klootchman Creek	"	Crook	OR	stream	Pringle Flat	43.985°N	120.452°W	
Klootchman Creek Dam	"	Crook	OR	dam	Pringle Flat	43.992°N	120.463°W	
Klootchman Creek Reservoir	"	Crook	OR	reservoir	Pringle Flat	43.992°N	120.463°W	
Klootchman Rock	"	Island	WA	bar	Oak Harbor	48.252°N	122.651°W	
Klootchville Creek	"	Thompson River	BC	stream	92I/11			near Ashcroft, British Columbia
Konamoxt Glacier	"together" or "to meet, a meeting"	Boundary Ranges, Juneau Icefield	AK	glacier	Skagway B-1	59°22′59″N	135°01′36″W	25 km SE of Skagway
Konamoxt Glacier	"	Tatshenshini-Alsek	BC	glacier	114P/32			
Kula Kula Peak	"geese"	Orford-Southgate Divide	BC	summit	92K/9	50°44′31″N	124°28′13″W	to the north of Nanitch Peak (q.v.); Kula Kula Peak is to the west of the Compton Neve
Kulla Kulla Creek	"geese"	King	WA	stream	Bandera	47.451°N	121.524°W	"geese" or any other large flying bird; usually kalakala (onomatopoeic)
Kulla Kulla Lake	"geese"	King	WA	lake	Bandera	47.001°N	121.050°W	Source of Kulla Kulla Creek
Kullagh Creek	"fence", "fenced enclosure"	Stump Lake, Nicola Valley	BC	stream	92I/8	50°23′0″N	120°20′34″W	usually kullaghan; may be otherwise Nlaka'pamux, Shuswap or Okanagan in origin.
Kullagh Creek	"	Stump Lake, Nicola Valley	BC	stream	92I/8	50°23′49″N	120°21′30″W	Source of Kullagh Creek.
Kumtux	"to know", "to understand"	Clark	WA	town/city	Battle Ground	45.789°N	122.520°W	

== L ==
Placename	Meaning	County or Region	State/Province	Type	USGS Quad or NTS topo	Latitude	Longitude	Comments
Lapie Creek	"foot"	Liard Country	BC	stream	94M/8	59°28′N	126°23′W	from the Chinook for "foot" and/or "feet" from fr. le pied
La Push	"mouth"	Clallam	WA	town/city	La Push	47.909°N	124.635°W	from the Chinook for "mouth" from fr. la bouche
Latah	"tooth", "teeth"	Spokane	WA	town/city	Latah	47.282°N	117.154°W	from fr. les dents, le dent
Latah Cemetery	"	Spokane	WA	cemetery	Latah	47.282°N	117.126°W	
Latah County	"	Latah	ID	civil	Tekoa	47.125°N	117.000°W	
Lebahdo	"shingle"	Slocan	BC	locality & rail siding	82F/12	49.6°N	117.600°W	from fr. le bardeau. There had been a shingle mill here.
Lemah Mountain	"hand"	King	WA	mountain	Chikamin Peak	47.5°N	121.3°W	from fr. le main.
Lemolo	"wild", "untamed"	King	WA	locale	Eagle Gorge	47.288°N	121.802°W	
Lemolo Lake	"	Douglas	OR	lake	Lemolo Lake	43.313°N	122.185°W	from fr. le moron.
Lemolo Point	"	Kitsap	WA	headland & locale	Suquamish	47.712°N	122.626°W	
Little Skookum Inlet	See Skookum	Mason County	WA	inlet		47°08′26″N	123°04′03″W	See also Big Skookum.
Lolo	"to carry"	Missoula	MT	town/city and locale	Southwest Missoula	46.759°N	114.080°W	poss. from fr la-là (idiomatic for "get/do that!", "that there")
Lolo Butte	"	Deschutes	OR	summit	Pistol Butte	43.853°N	121.607°W	
Lolo Creek	"	Benewah	ID	stream	Tensed	47.186°N	116.974°W	
Lolo Creek	"	Idaho	ID	stream	Sixmile Creek	46.372°N	116.171°W	
Lolo Creek	"	Lake	MT	stream	Woods Bay	47.879°N	114.033°W	
Lolo Creek	"	Missoula	MT	stream	Florence	46.743°N	114.061°W	
Lolo Creek	"	Clallam	WA	stream	Slide Peak	47.925°N	123.966°W	
Lolo Creek Campground	"	Idaho	ID	locale	Brown Creek Ridge	46.293°N	115.751°W	
Lolo Creek Mine	"	Missoula	MT	mine	Camp Creek	46.768°N	114.340°W	
Lolo Hot Springs	"	Missoula	MT	town/city	Lolo Hot Springs	46.728°N	114.530°W	
Lolo, Mount	"	Kamloops	BC	summit		50°48′01″N	120°07′06″W	also Lolo Creek in same area; named for Jean-Baptiste Lolo, aka Chief Lolo
Lolo, Mount		Quadra Island	BC	summit		50°08′52″N	125°20′39″W	
Lolo National Forest	"	Sanders	MT	forest	Driveway Peak	47.583°N	115.583°W	
Lolo Pass	"	Benewah	ID	gap	Benewah	47.220°N	116.835°W	
Lolo Pass	"	Clearwater	ID	gap	Lolo Hot Springs	46.635°N	114.579°W	
Lolo Pass	"	Missoula	MT	gap	Lolo Hot Springs	46.635°N	114.579°W	same as Lolo Pass, Clearwater County, ID (previous)
Lolo Pass	"	Hood River	OR	gap	Bull Run Lake	45.427°N	121.795°W	
Lolo Pass Ski Area	"	Idaho	ID	locale	Lolo Hot Springs	46.637°N	114.576°W	
Lolo Pass Winter Sports Area	"	Missoula	MT	locale	Lolo Hot Springs	46.637°N	114.579°W	
Lolo Peak	"	Missoula	MT	summit	Carlton Lake	46.675°N	114.244°W	
Lolo Peak Trailer Court	"	Missoula	MT	town/city	Florence	46.749°N	114.093°W	
Lolo Ranger Station	"	Missoula	MT	locale	Garden Point	46.774°N	114.433°W	

== M ==
Placename	Meaning	County or Region	State/Province	Type	USGS Quad or NTS topo	Latitude	Longitude	Comments
Malakwa	"mosquito" from Fr. maringouin	Shuswap	BC	community	82L/15	50°56′0″N	118°48′0″W	18 km NE of Sicamous
Melakwa Lake	"mosquito"	King	WA	lake	Snoqualmie Pass	47°27′1.16″N	121°28′8.27″W	
Memaloose	"dead, to die, dead person/thing"	Clackamas	OR	locale	Bedford Point	45.196°N	122.214°W	
Memaloose Airstrip	"	Wallowa	OR	airport	Hat Point	45.433°N	116.696°W	
Memaloose Creek	"	Manning Park	BC	stream	92H/2	49°6′0″N	121°51′0″W	
Memaloose Creek	"	Clackamas	OR	stream	Bedford Point	45.191°N	122.225°W	
Memaloose Creek	"	Tillamook	OR	stream	Netarts	45.469°N	123.886°W	
Memaloose Guard Station	"	Wallowa	OR	locale	Hat Point	45.437°N	116.688°W	
Memaloose Island	"	Bonner	ID	island	Hope	48.204°N	116.296°W	
Memaloose Island	"	Klickitat	WA	island	Petersburg	45.619°N	121.118°W	
Memaloose Island (historical)	"	Umatilla	OR	island	Hat Rock	45.922°N	119.192°W	
Memaloose Island (historical)	"	Wasco	OR	island	Lyle	45.703°N	121.341°W	
Memaloose Island Light	"	Klickitat	WA	locale	Stacker Butte	45.653°N	121.078°W	
Memaloose Lake	"	Clackamas	OR	lake	Wanderers Peak	45.098°N	122.236°W	
Memaloose Lake	"	Lane	OR	lake	Huckleberry Mountain	43.849°N	122.315°W	
Memaloose Overlook	"	Wasco	OR	locale	Lyle	45.694°N	121.350°W	
Memaloose Point	"	Tillamook	OR	cape	Netarts	45.471°N	123.888°W	
Memaloose Ridge	"	Chelan	WA	ridge	Goode Mountain	48.475°N	120.886°W	
Memaloose Rock	"	Cowlitz	WA	bar	Oak Point	46.191°N	123.166°W	
Memaloose State Park	"	Wasco	OR	park	Lyle	45.696°N	121.332°W	
Memaloose Trail	"	Clackamas	OR	trail	Bedford Point	45.160°N	122.211°W	
Mesachie Lake	"evil", "nasty", "malign"	Cowichan	BC	lake	92C16	48°49′N	124°06′W	
Mesachie Lake	"	Cowichan	BC	community	92C16	48°49′N	124°07′W	
Mesachie Nose	"	Dean Channel	BC	point	93D6	52°30′25″N	127°09′45″W	
Mesahchie Glacier	"evil", "nasty", "malign"	Skagit	WA	glacier	Mount Arriva	48.583°N	120.864°W	Mesahchie, usually mesachie, can mean "naughty" or "mischievous" for a child, but the more devilish implication seems clear here, as with the Pass and Peak.
Mesahchie Pass	"	Skagit	WA	gap	Mount Logan	48.598°N	120.864°W	
Mesahchie Peak	"	Skagit	WA	summit	Mount Logan	48.579°N	120.879°W	Mesahchie Peak is on Ragged Ridge, which also includes other Jargon-named peaks: Kimtah Peak, Katsuk Peak, Cosho Peak (q.v.)
Mesatchee Creek	var. mesachie, mesahchie, "evil" "nasty" "malign"	Lewis	WA	stream	Sawtooth Ridge	46°42'N	121° 54'W	
Mesatchee Creek	"	Yakima	WA	stream	Norse Peak	46.901	-121.415	
Mimulus Creek	var. of memaloose (dead, dead man)	Garibaldi Park	BC	creek	92G14	59°57′00″N	123°03′00″W	
Mimulus Lake	"	Garibaldi Park	BC	lake	93G14	52°30′25″N	123°02′00″W	
Mokst Lake	"two"	Ocean Falls	BC	lake	93D/5			Ikt Lake (from "one" is immediately downstream)
Moolack Beach	"elk"	Lincoln	OR	beach	Newport North	44.700°N	124.064°W	
Moolack Butte	"	Deschutes	OR	summit	Elk Lake	43.988°N	121.787°W	
Moolack Creek	"	Boise	ID	stream	Warbonnet Peak	44.121°N	115.084°W	
Moolack Creek	"	Lane	OR	stream	Chucksney Mountain	43.879°N	122.117°W	
Moolack Creek	"	Lincoln	OR	stream	Newport North	44.703°N	124.063°W	
Moolack Flat	"	Lane	OR	flat	Waldo Mountain	43.838°N	122.085°W	
Moolack Lake	"	Lane	OR	lake	Waldo Mountain	43.823°N	122.070°W	
Moolack Mountain	"	Lane	OR	summit	Waldo Mountain	43.850°N	122.094°W	
Moolack Spring	"	Columbia	WA	spring	Oregon Butte	46.121°N	117.726°W	
Mowich	"deer"	Klamath	OR	locale	Muttonchop Butte	43.372°N	123°1′0″W	
Mowich Butte	"	Skamania	WA	summit	Lookout Mountain	45.799°N	122.029°W	
Mowich Butte Lookout	"	Skamania	WA	locale	Lookout Mountain	45.800°N	122.029°W	
Mowich Camp	"	Skamania	WA	locale	Lookout Mountain	45.793°N	122.042°W	
Mowich Creek	"	Shoshone	ID	stream	Monumental Buttes	47.071°N	115.753°W	
Mowich Creek	"	Douglas	OR	stream	Potter Mountain	43.251°N	122.338°W	
Mowich Creek	"	Lillooet River; NW of Pemberton	BC	stream	92J/11	50°30′0″N	123°1′0″W	
Mowich Creek	"	Manning Park near the Lightning Lakes	BC	stream	92H/2	49°0′0″N	120°59′0″W	
Mowich Face	"	Pierce	WA	cliff	Mount Rainier West	46.868°N	121.791°W	
Mowich Flats	"	Birkenhead Ranges; N of Pemberton	BC	flat	92J/10	50°33′0″N	122°55′0″W	just E of Tenquille Mountain
Mowich Illahee	"deer pasture" "place you'll find deer"	Okanogan	WA	town/city	Buck Mountain	48.398°N	119.813°W	
Mowich Lake	"	Deadman River; Bonaparte Plateau	BC	lake	92P/2	51°1′0″N	121°54′0″W	
Mowich Lake	"	Linn	OR	lake	Marion Forks	44.503°N	121.880°W	
Mowich Lake	"	Pierce	WA	lake	Mowich Lake	46.939°N	121.860°W	
Mowich Lake Entrance	"	Pierce	WA	locale	Golden Lakes	46.927°N	121.914°W	
Mowich Park	"	Douglas	OR	flat	Potter Mountain	43.258°N	122.269°W	
Mowich Post Office (historical)	"	Klamath	OR	po	Muttonchop Butte	43.372°N	121.828°W	
Mowich Recreation Site	"	Baker	OR	locale	Phillips Lake	44.692°N	118.068°W	
Mowich River	"	Pierce	WA	stream	Le Dout Creek	46.901°N	122.029°W	
Mowich Spring	"	Harney	OR	spring	Big Mowich Mountain	43.952°N	119.581°W	
Mowich Spring Butte	"	Klamath	OR	summit	Big Hole	43.378°N	121.369°W	
Mowich Mountain, Big	"	Harney	OR	summit	Big Mowich Mountain	43.952°N	119.564°W	also indexed under "B"
Mowich Reservoir, Big	"	Grant	OR	reservoir	Suplee Butte	44.224°N	119.608°W	also indexed under "B"
Mowitch Basin	"deer"	Pondera	MT	basin	Mitten Lake	48.252°N	112.970°W	
Mowitch Creek	"	Snake Indian River; Jasper National Park	AB	stream	83E/8	53°25′00″N	118°29′00″W	Alberta location code 51-4-W6
Mowitch Creek	"	Valley	ID	stream	Pungo Mountain	44.779°N	115.124°W	
Mowitch Lake	"	King	WA	lake	Lake Philippa	47.597°N	121.548°W	
Mowitch Point	"	Skeena estuary near Prince Rupert	BC	cape	103J/1	54°10′00″N	130°01′00″W	opposite Port Essington
Mox Chehalis Creek	"two Chehalis", "No. 2 Chehalis"	Grays Harbor	WA	stream	Malone	46.966°N	123.361°W	mox is a variant of moxt or mokst for "two"
Mox Chuck Slough	"two water(s)"	Grays Harbor	WA	stream	Central Park	46.958°N		
Mox Chuck Truck Trail	"two water(s)"	Grays Harbor	WA	trail	Kamilche Valley	123.240°W|		
Mox Creek	"two"	Idaho	ID	stream	Hemlock Butte	46.384°N	115.679°W	
Mox Creek	"two"	Price	WI	stream	Jump River Fire Tower NW	45.427°N	90.641°W	
Mox Lake	"two"	Kenai Peninsula	AK	lake	Kenai C-1 SW	60.513°N	150.308°W	
Mox Peaks	"two"	Whatcom	WA	summit	Mount Redoubt	48.948°N	121.254°W	also known as the Twin Spirs; named Mox Peaks by the US Parks Service
Moxt Glacier	"two"	Tatshenshini-Alsek	BC	glacier	114P/6			Flanked by Ikt Glacier ("one") and Kloon Glacier ("three") and other numbered glaciers
Muckamuck Creek	"food", "to eat"	Okanogan	WA	stream	Conconully West	48.554°N	119.844°W	
Muckamuck Hill	"	Okanogan	WA	summit	Conconully West	48.603°N	119.798°W	
Muckamuck Mountain	"	Okanogan	WA	summit	Conconully West	48.611°N	119.855°W	
Muckamuck Pass	"	Okanogan	WA	gap	Conconully West	48.588°N	119.811°W	
Muckamuck Trail	"	Clackamas	OR	trail	Coxit Mountain	48.634°N	119.842°W	

== N ==
Placename	Meaning	County or Region	State/Province	Type	USGS Quad or NTS topo	Latitude	Longitude	Comments
Nanitch Campground	"lookout", "guard"	Clackamas	OR	locale	Mount Hood South	45.310°N	121.734°W	nanitch means to watch, to see, to look out.
Nanitch Peak	"to watch", "to see", "to guard", "to look out"	Orford-Southgate Divide	BC	locale	92K/9	50°43′37″N	124°28′29″W	Nanitch Peak is to the west of the Compton Neve
Nesika	"we", "our", "ours", or "us"	Lewis	WA	locale	Winters Mountain	46°28′26″N	122°17′21″N	Nesika is a flooded town. Nesika is the generic second person article and pronoun, both singular and plural
Nowitka Lake	"indeed, verily"	Purcell Mountains/East Kootenay	BC	lake		49°55′00″N	115°22′00″W	
Nowitka Lake	"indeed, verily"	Purcell Mountains/East Kootenay	BC	lake		49°55′12″N	116°24′08″W	

== O ==
Placename	Meaning	County or Region	State/Province	Type	USGS Quad or NTS topo	Latitude	Longitude	Comments
Olalla	"berry"	Similkameen-Okanagan	BC	community	82E/5	49°15′56″N	119°49′40″W	on Hwy 3A between Keremeos and Okanagan
Olalla	"	Kitsap	WA	community		47°25′45″N	122°32′44″W	
Ollala Creek	"	Similkameen-Okanagan	BC	stream	82E/5	49°15′52″N	119°49′45″W	at Olalla, BC
Ollala Creek	"	Douglas County, Oregon	OR	Stream		43°00′23″N	123°35′13″W	
Ollala Canyon	"	Chelan	WA	valley	Peshastin	47.539°N	120.541°W	
Ollala Dam	"	Lincoln	OR	dam	Toledo North	44.682°N	123.930°W	
Ollala Lake	"	Lincoln	OR	reservoir	Toledo North	44.682°N	123.930°W	
Olallie Creek	"berry"	Lewis County, Washington	WA	stream	Chinook Pass	46.77425 N	121.55494 W	
Olallie State Park	"	King County, Washington	WA	state park		47°26′41″N	121°41′48″W	
Olo Mountain	"hunger", "to be hungry"	Snohomish	WA	summit	Meadow Mountain	48.158°N	121.859°W	(or thirsty)

== P ==
Placename	Meaning	County or region	State/province	Type	USGS Quad or NTS topo	Latitude	Longitude	Comments
Pill Point	"red"	Barclay Sound	BC	cape	92C/14	48°58′0″N	125°5′0″W	may be of English origin, but possibly Chinook
Pillchuck Creek	"red water"	Squamish River	BC	stream	92G/14	49°52′0″N	123°14′0″W	
Pillman Creek	"red man"	Atlin Lake	BC	stream	104N/5	59°17′0″N	133°48′0″W	may be an English surname, but possibly Chinook
Pilchuck	"red water"	Snohomish	WA	town/city	McMurray	48.266°N	122.165°W	
Pilchuck	"	Snohomish	WA	town/city	Granite Falls	48.019°N	121.913°W	
Pilchuck Bridge Campground	"	Skagit	WA	locale	McMurray	48.321°N	122.141°W	
Pilchuck Creek	"	Clallam	WA	stream	Ozette	48.246°N	124.626°W	
Pilchuck Creek	"	Snohomish	WA	stream	Arlington West	48.209°N	122.224°W	
Pilchuck River	"	Snohomish	WA	stream	Snohomish	47.904°N	122.090°W	
Pilchuck River Dam	"	Snohomish	WA	dam	Granite Falls	48.018°N	121.905°W	
Pilchuck, Mount	"red water"	Snohomish	WA	summit	Verlot	48.058°N	121.796°W	
Pilldolla Creek	"red dollar", "gold dollar"	Skwawka River, Jervis Inlet	BC	stream	92K/8	50°17′0″N	124°2′0″W	"Pil" in this context probably refers to gold, rather than the colour red; context may be "blood money"
Pillpill Mountain	"blood"	Murtle Lake, Shuswap Highland	BC	stream	104N/5	52°7′57″N	119°54′50″W	doubling pil ("red") means "blood"; Kilpill Mountain is to south (q.v.)
Piluk Glacier	"red here/this"	Stave River, Garibaldi Ranges	BC	glacier	92G/10	49°40′42″N	122°32′6″W	maybe of Halqemeylem origin, but possibly Chinook
Piluk Peak	"red here/this"	Stave River, Garibaldi Ranges	BC	summit	92G/10	49°40′0″N	122°34′0″W	maybe of Halqemeylem origin, but possibly Chinook; -uk ending may mean "people", as in Halqemeylem
Pish Dam	"fish"	Glacier	MT	dam	Rocky Buttes	48.833°N	112.562°W	
Pish River	"	Northwest Arctic	AK	stream	Kotzebue A-4	66.178°N	163.948°W	pish is a usual native adaptation of "fish", and is standard Jargon. But given the location this may not be Jargon as such, but an independent native adaptation from the local language (Eyak?)
Pishak Island	"bad", "evil", "malicious"	Sitka	AK	island	Port Alexander D-5	56.811°N	135.434°W	

== S ==
Placename	Meaning	County or region	State/province	Type	USGS Quad or NTS topo	Latitude	Longitude	Comments
Saltchuck	"salt water"	the sea, the ocean, the Pacific						
Sinnamoxt Glacier	"seven"	Tatshenshin-Alsek	BC	glacier	114P/3			flanked by Taghum Glacier ("six") and Stotekin Glacier ("eight") in numbered glaciers area
Siskiyou County	"bob-tailed horse"	Siskiyou	CA	county	Yreka	41.59°N	122.53°W	
Sitkum	"half", "halfway", "halfbreed"	Coos	OR	town/city	Sitkum	43.148°N	123.860°W	
Sitkum Butte	"	Deschutes	OR	summit	Pistol Butte	43.827°N	121.545°W	
Sitkum Creek	"	Wrangell-Petersburg	AK	stream	Petersburg D-6	56.932°N	133.868°W	
Sitkum Creek	"	Kootenay Lake	BC	creek	82F/11	49°36′0″N	117°10′0″W	halfway along west arm of lake, and halfway between Nelson and Balfour
Sitkum Creek	"	Shuswap River	BC	stream	82L/8	50°23′0″N	118°28′0″W	Halfway down east side of Sugar Lake
Sitkum Creek	"	Lane	OR	stream	Huckleberry Mountain	43.794°N	122.297°W	
Sitkum Creek	"	Snohomish	WA	stream	Glacier Peak West	48.104°N	121.184°W	
Sitkum Glacier	"	Snohomish	WA	glacier	Glacier Peak West	48.109°N	121.130°W	
Sitkum Lake	"	Gold Range, Monashee Mountains	BC	lake	82L/8	50°26′0″N	118°17′0″W	at head of Sitkum Creek and halfway between Sugar Lake and Arrow Lake, and on Sitkum Plateau
Sitkum Pass	"	Yukon–Koyukuk	AK	gap	Wiseman A-1	67.182°N	150.011°W	
Sitkum Plateau	"	Gold Range, Monashee Mountains	BC	plateau	82L/8	50°25′0″N	118°15′0″W	halfway between Sugar Lake and Arrow Lake
Sitkum Post Office (historical)	"	Coos	OR	town/city	Sitkum	43.148°N	123.860°W	
Sitkum River	"	Clallam	WA	stream	Indian Pass	47.953°N	124.242°W	
Sitkum Shelter	"	Clallam	WA	locale	Indian Pass	47.945°N	124.169°W	
Siwash Bay	"Indian/First Nations/Native American male"	Valdez–Cordova	AK	bay	Seward D-2	60.955°N	147.651°W	see Siwash
Siwash Bay	"	Knight Inlet	BC	bay	92K/12	50°40′0″N	125°47′0″W	"
Siwash Cove	"	Flores Island, Clayoquot Sound	BC	cove	92E/8	49°16′0″N	126°11′0″W	"
Siwash Creek	"	Matanuska-Susitna	AK	stream	Talkeetna C-3	62.571°N	151.069°W	"
Siwash Creek	"	Yukon–Koyukuk	AK	stream	Chandalar A-6	67.126°N	149.557°W	"
Siwash Creek	"	Yukon–Koyukuk	AK	stream	Black River A-2 NW	66.233°N	141.833°W	"
Siwash Creek	"	Thompson Plateau	BC	stream	92H/9	49°40′0″N	120°20′0″W	" 25 km NNE of Princeton
Siwash Creek	"	Fraser Canyon	BC	stream	92H/11	49°35′0″N	121°24′0″W	" 5 km NE of Yale
Siwash Creek	"	Monashee Mountains, Canoe Reach, Kinbasket Lake	BC	stream	83D/7	2°15′0″N	118°48′0″W	" 45 km NE of Blue River
Siwash Creek	"	Fraser Canyon	BC	stream	92I/4	50°6′0″N	121°34′0″W	" 15 km S of Lytton
Siwash Creek	"	Clearwater	ID	stream	Clarke Mountain	46.671°N	115.550°W	"
Siwash Creek	"	Shoshone	ID	stream	Three Sisters	47.232°N	115.745°W	"
Siwash Creek	"	Douglas	OR	stream	Steamboat	43.369°N	122.671°W	"
Siwash Creek	"	Clallam	WA	stream	Dickey Lake	48.058°N	124.617°W	"
Siwash Creek	"	Lewis	WA	stream	Blue Lake	121.693°W	"	
Siwash Creek	"	Okanogan	WA	stream	Tonasket	48.713°N	119.437°W	"
Siwash Gulch	"	Siskiyou	CA	valley	Indian Creek Baldy	41.686°N	122.814°W	"
Siwash Island	"	Valdez–Cordova	AK	island	Seward D-2	60.961°N	147.614°W	"
Siwash Island	"	Pitt River (Pitt Polder)	BC	island	92G/7	49°20′0″N	122°39′0″W	"
Siwash Lake	"	Quesnel Highland	BC	lake	82F/6	53°31′5″N	121°59′55″W	" 60 km SE of Prince George
Siwash Lake	"	Thompson Plateau	BC	lake	93H/12	49°50′0″N	120°18′0″W	" 45 km SE of Merritt
Siwash Lake	"	Bonnington Range	BC	lake	82H/16	49°22′0″N	117°28′0″W	" 15 km NE of Castlegar, near Siwash Mountain
Siwash Mountain	"	Bonnington Range	BC	summit	82F/6	49°21′24″N	117°27′3″W	" 15 km NE of Castlegar, near Siwash Lake
Siwash Pass	"	Yukon–Koyukuk	AK	gap	Chandalar B-3	67.315°N	148.379°W	"
Siwash Peak	"	Shoshone	ID	summit	Three Sisters	47.205°N	115.741°W	"
Siwash Point	"	Okanagan Lake	BC	point	982E/13	49°53′0″N	119°31′0″W	" W. end Kelowna-Westbank bridge
Siwash Reservoir	"	Phillips	MT	reservoir	Pea Ridge	47.748°N	107.933°W	"
Siwash Rock	"	Stanley Park, Vancouver	BC	rock	92G/6	49°18′32″N	123°9′11″W	" NB see Siwash Rock
Siwash Rock	"	Johnstone Strait	BC	rock	92K/6	50°21′0″N	125°28′0″W	" off S shore East Thurlow Island
Siwash Rock Mountain	"	Shuswap Highland -Salmon River	BC	summit	82L/5	50°23′44″N	119°32′28″W	" 25 km WSW of Armstrong, British Columbia
Siwash Slough	"	Skagit	WA	gut	Bow	48.563°N	122.491°W	"
Skook Creek	see Skookum	Lewis	WA	stream	Toledo	46.464°N	122.770°W	Skook is a short form of Skookum
Skook Davidson, Mount	"	Kechika Ranges, Northern Rockies	BC	summit	94L/11	58°40′55″N	127°19′57″W	" Named for John "Skook" Davidson who was an outfitter and rancher in this region, and a contractor on the Alaska Highway. The mountain overlooks his Flying J Ranch
Skook Jim, Mount	"	Stein River, Lillooet Ranges	BC	summit	94J/1	50°7′12″N	122°13′20″W	" Skook Jim or Skookum Jim, aka 25-Mile Jim, was a pioneer in the Pemberton-Birken area
Skooks Landing	see Skookum	Rabbit River at confluence Liard River	BC	landing	94M/11	59°37′56″N	127°7′12″W	Skook is a short form of Skookum; named in reference to "Skook" Davidson
Skookoleel Creek	"big berries"?	Flathead	MT	stream	Skookoleel Creek	48.571°N	114.313°W	possibly not of Chinook origin, but if so "oleel" may be from "olallie" ("berry")
Skookum	see Skookum	Lake	MI	town/city	Luther	44.081°N	85.644°W	
Skookum (historical)	"	Flathead	MT	locale	Somers	48.014°N	114.217°W	Usages of Skookum in Montana, Idaho and points east and south may derive from the "monster" meaning, rather than the usual "strong, capable, genuine" context more familiar nearer the Pacific Coast.
Skookum (historical)	"	Lander	NV	town/city	Vigus Butte	39.538°N	117.175°W	
Skookum Bay	"	Red Lake, near Kenora	ON	bay	52 N/4	51°01′18″N	93°52′12″W	
Skookum Bridge	"	Lake	MI	bridge	Luther	44.079°N	85.643°W	
Skookum Butte	"	Idaho	ID	summit	West Fork Butte	46.665°N	114.394°W	
Skookum Butte	"	Missoula	MT	summit	West Fork Butte	46.665°N	114.394°W	
Skookum Butte	"	Klamath	OR	summit	Walker Mountain	43.254°N	121.655°W	
Skookum Butte Lookout	"	Missoula	MT	locale	West Fork Butte	46.665°N	114.394°W	
Skookum Canyon	"	Shoshone	ID	valley	Three Sisters	47.231°N	115.711°W	
Skookum Canyon	"	Harney	OR	valley	Dollar Basin	44.040°N	118.539°W	
Skookum Canyon	"	Franklin	WA	valley	Monumental Rock	46.595°N	118.440°W	
Skookum Canyon	"	Klickitat	WA	valley	Wahkiacus	45.818°N	121.124°W	
Skookum Chuck Camp (historical)	"	Douglas	OR	locale	Acker Rock	43.019°N	122.671°W	
Skookum Chuck Creek	"	Baker	OR	stream	Sturgill Creek	44.685°N	117.079°W	
Skookum Community Center	"	Pend Oreille	WA	locale	Skookum Creek	48.257°N	117.220°W	
Skookum Creek	"	Anchorage	AK	stream	Seward D-6 SE	60.786°N	148.996°W	
Skookum Creek	"	Nome	AK	stream	Solomon D-6	64.850°N	164.550°W	
Skookum Creek	"	Nome	AK	stream	Nome C-1	64.640°N	165.216°W	
Skookum Creek	"	Nome	AK	stream	Teller A-3	65.099°N	166.247°W	
Skookum Creek	"	Nome	AK	stream	Teller A-3	65.031°N	166.196°W	
Skookum Creek	"	Nome	AK	stream	Bendeleben C-5	65.652°N	164.421°W	
Skookum Creek	"	Nome	AK	stream	Teller C-5	65.631°N	167.435°W	
Skookum Creek	"	Nome	AK	stream	Bendeleben C-5	65.516°N	164.269°W	
Skookum Creek	"	Prince of Wales – Hyder	AK	stream	Ketchikan D-1	55.984°N	130.052°W	
Skookum Creek	"	Valdez–Cordova	AK	stream	Nabesna A-2	62.109°N	141.835°W	
Skookum Creek	"	Valdez–Cordova	AK	stream	Nabesna B-4	62.401°N	142.973°W	
Skookum Creek	"	Yukon–Koyukuk	AK	stream	Medfra A-4	63.097°N	154.925°W	
Skookum Creek	"	Yukon–Koyukuk	AK	stream	Tanana A-1	65.199°N	150.144°W	
Skookum Creek	"	Mamquam River, Squamish	BC	stream	92G/10	49°43′7″N	122°59′35″W	
Skookum Creek	"	Idaho	ID	stream	Holly Creek	46.422°N	115.147°W	
Skookum Creek	"	Kootenai	ID	stream	Skitwish Peak	47.739°N	116.469°W	
Skookum Creek	"	Shoshone	ID	stream	Three Sisters	47.228°N	115.707°W	
Skookum Creek	"	Baker	OR	stream	Bennet Peak	45.004°N	117.426°W	
Skookum Creek	"	Clatsop	OR	stream	Gearhart	46.033°N	123.908°W	
Skookum Creek	"	Douglass	OR	stream	Hamaker Butte	43.131°N	122.349°W	
Skookum Creek	"	Grant	OR	stream	Johnny Cake Mountain	44.969°N	119.433°W	
Skookum Creek	"	Harney	OR	stream	Dollar Basin	44.040°N	118.538°W	
Skookum Creek	"	Jackson	OR	stream	Cascade Gorge	42.714°N	122.543°W	
Skookum Creek	"	Jackson	OR	stream	Parker Mountain	42.023°N	122.360°W	
Skookum Creek	"	Lane	OR	stream	Waldo Mountain	43.856°N	122.063°W	
Skookum Creek	"	Umatilla	OR	stream	Jubilee Lake	45.867°N	117.983°W	
Skookum Creek	"	Wallowa	OR	stream	Duck Creek	45.109°N	116.939°W	
Skookum Creek	"	Wasco	OR	stream	Kaskela	44.922°N	121.080°W	
Skookum Creek	"	Clallam	WA	stream	Mount Zion	47.930°N	123.092°W	
Skookum Creek	"	Mason	WA	stream	Shelton	47.133°N	123.087°W	
Skookum Creek	"	Pend Oreille	WA	stream	Cusick	48.299°N	117.251°W	
Skookum Creek	"	Pierce	WA	stream	Sun Top	47.054°N	121.573°W	
Skookum Creek	"	Whatcom	WA	stream	Acme	48.671°N	122.140°W	
Skookum Creek Camp	"	Douglas	OR	locale	Acker Rock	43.020°N	122.670°W	
Skookum Creek Recreation Site	"	Lane	OR	locale	Waldo Mountain	43.861°N	122.044°W	
Skookum Flat	"	Klickitat	WA	flat	Klickitat	45.805°N	121.176°W	
Skookum Game Exclosure	"	Morrow	OR	locale	Madison Butte	45.016°N	119.412°W	
Skookum Glacier	"	Kenai Peninsula	AK	glacier	Seward C-6	60.730°N	148.896°W	
Skookum Gorge	"	Jackson	OR	valley	Cascade Gorge	42.713°N	122.544°W	
Skookum Gulch	"	Yukon–Koyukuk	AK	valley	Iditarod D-1 NW	62.985°N	156.383°W	
Skookum Gulch	"	Sooke, Greater Victoria	BC	locale	92B/5	48°22′56″N	123°51′28″W	
Skookum Gulch	"	Siskiyou	CA	valley	Gazelle Mountain	41.493°N	122.693°W	
Skookum Gulch	"	Stewart River, NE of Mayo	YT	river	106D/6	64°29′58″N	135°14′40″W	
Skookum Gulch	"	Yukon River, near Dawson City	YT	valley	115O/14	63°55′04″N	139°20′20″W	
Skookum Island	"	Skookumchuck Narrows, Sechelt Inlet	BC	island	92G/12	49°43′28″N	123°52′36″W	
Skookum Jim Mountain	"	Peel River, N of Dawson City; Ogilvie Range	YT	summit	116G/3	65°10′35″N	139°02′20″W	named for Skookum Jim, co-discoverer of Klondike goldfields; not to be confused with namesake of Mount Skook Jim (q.v.)
Skookum Joe Canyon	"	Sweet Grass	MT	valley	Enos Mountain	45.542°N	110.041°W	
Skookum Lake	"	Kenai Peninsula	AK	lake	Kenai C-2 NW	60.688°N	150.749°W	
Skookum Lake	"	Deadman River, Bonaparte Plateau	BC	lake	92P/2	51°6′37″N	120°52′52″W	
Skookum Lake	"	Idaho	ID	lake	Dick Creek	46.636°N	114.363°W	
Skookum Lake	"	Flathead	MT	lake	Marion	48.023°N	114.743°W	
Skookum Lake	"	Mississagi River, near Sault Ste. Marie	ON	lake	41J/12	46°31′30″N	83°35′50″W	
Skookum Lake	"	Clackamas	OR	lake	Bagby Hot Springs	44.998°N	122.162°W	
Skookum Lake	"	Douglas	OR	lake	Garwood Butte	43.167°N	122.334°W	
Skookum Lake	"	Lake	OR	lake	Commodore Ridge	42.712°N	120.072°W	
Skookum Lake	"	Lane	OR	lake	Waldo Mountain	43.865°N	122.032°W	
Skookum Lake	"	Tillamook	OR	reservoir	Blaine	45.373°N	123.701°W	
Skookum Lake Campground	"	Clackamas	OR	locale	Bagby Hot Springs	44.998°N	122.164°W	
Skookum Lake Dam	"	Tillamook	OR	dam	Blaine	45.373°N	123.697°W	
Skookum Lake Waterhole	"	Lake	OR	reservoir	Commodore Ridge	42.708°N	120.068°W	
Skookum Lakes	"	Marion	OR	lake	Newberg	45.263°N	122.959°W	
Skookum Meadow	"	Skamania	WA	flat	Lone Butte	46.096°N	121.844°W	
Skookum Mine	"	Summit	CO	mine	Dillon	39.629°N	106.098°W	
Skookum Mine	"	Lander	NV	mine	Vigus Butte	39.541°N	117.178°W	
Skookum Mine	"	Kittitas	WA	mine	Mount Stuart	47.411°N	120.975°W	
Skookum Mining District	"	Lander	NV	civil	Vigus Butte	39.558°N	117.179°W	
Skookum Mountain	"	Lincoln	MT	summit	Sylvanite	48.715°N	115.790°W	
Skookum Peak	"	Pend Oreille	WA	summit	Skookum Creek	48.303°N	117.189°W	
Skookum Peninsula	"	Red Lake, near Kenora	ON	cape	52N/4	51°01′39″N	93°51′44″W	
Skookum Point	"	Pelican Lake, SE of Brandon	MB	cape	62G/12	49°30′21″N	99°40′32″W	
Skookum Point	"	Sanders	MT	summit	Bend	47.968°N	115.020°W	
Skookum Point	"	Mason	WA	cape	Shelton	47.205°N	123.009°W	
Skookum Portage	"	Churchill River, between Nelson and Granville Lakes	MB	portage	63N/16	55°59′42″N	100°28′26″W	
Skookum Pond	"	Douglas	OR	lake	Buckeye Lake	43.009°N	122.596°W	
Skookum Prairie	"	Humboldt	CA	area	French Camp Ridge	41.159°N	123.867°W	
Skookum Prairie	"	Douglas	OR	flat	Garwood Butte	43.146°N	122.325°W	
Skookum Prairie Lookout	"	Douglas	OR	locale	Garwood Butte	43.138°N	122.328°W	
Skookum Puss Mountain	"strong cat" (big cougar)	Chelan	WA	summit	Prince Creek	48.199°N	120.480°W	
Skookum Reservoir	see Skookum	Delta	CO	reservoir	Grand Mesa	39.062°N	107.880°W	
Skookum River	"	Nome	AK	stream	Solomon C-4	64.663°N	163.799°W	
Skookum Rock	"	Crook	OR	pillar	Opal Mountain	44.548°N	120.586°W	
Skookum Saddle	"	Kootenai	ID	gap	Skitwish Peak	47.706°N	116.432°W	
Skookum Spring	"	Grant	OR	spring	Dollar Basin	44.052°N	118.502°W	
Skookum Spring	"	Harney	OR	spring	Van	43.939°N	118.699°W	
Skookum Spring	"	Harney	OR	spring	Round Top Butte	43.401°N	119.889°W	
Skookum Spring	"	Klamath	OR	spring	Walker Mountain	43.260°N	121.697°W	
Skookum Spring	"	Morrow	OR	spring	Madison Butte	45.014°N	119.408°W	
Skookum Spring	"	Umatilla	OR	spring	Jubilee Lake	45.842°N	117.984°W	
Skookum Tum Tum Park	"brave", "stalwart" or "big/powerful waterfall"	Marion	OR	park	Drake Crossing	44.961°N	122.631°W	
Skookumchuck	"rapids" ("strong water"); See Skookumchuck	Prince of Wales – Hyder	AK	channel	Craig D-4	55.915°N	133.313°W	
Skookumchuck	"	Lillooet River	BC	locality	92G/16	49°56′14″N	122°24′29″W	(Skookumchuck Hot Springs/Skatin); name derives from "Falls of the Lillooet", which are shallow rapids in this area, although implies also the hot spring as well; Skookumchuck Indian Reserves Nos. 4 and 4A, and Skookumchuck SB 27 Indian Government District, are same area
Skookumchuck	"	Columbia River, East Kootenay	BC	community	82G/13	49°54′50″N	115°45′35″W	name derives from Skookumchuck Rapids on Columbia River in this area
Skookumchuck	"	Thurston	WA	town/city	East Olympia	46.906°N	122.770°W	
Skookumchuck Brook	"	Grafton	NH	stream	Franconia	44.194°N	71.694°W	
Skookumchuck Campground	"	Idaho	ID	locale	Slate Creek	45.703°N	116.314°W	
Skookumchuck Canyon	"	Douglas	WA	valley	Palisades	47.421°N	119.925°W	
Skookumchuck Creek	"	Columbia River, East Kootenay	BC	stream	82G/13	49°55′50″N	115°46′17″W	name derives from Skookumchuck Rapids on the Columbia River
Skookumchuck Creek	"	Idaho	ID	stream	Slate Creek	45.700°N	116.317°W	
Skookumchuck Creek	"	Kittitas	WA	stream	Cape Horn SE	47.039°N	120.023°W	
Skookumchuck Dam	"	Thurston	WA	dam	Vail	46.785°N	122.717°W	
Skookumchuck Heights Spring	"	Kittitas	WA	spring	Whiskey Dick Mountain	47.046°N	120.199°W	
Skookumchuck Mountain	"	Purcell Mountains, East Kootenay	BC	summit	82F/16	49°50′38″N	116°13′38″W	name derives from Skookumchuck Rapids on Columbia River
Skookumchuck Narrows	"	Sechelt Inlet	BC	saltwater rapids	92G/12	49°44′13″N	123°53′35″W	
Skookumchuck Narrows Provincial Park	"	Sechelt Inlet	BC	park	92G/12	49°44′0″N	123°54′0″W	
Skookumchuck Rapids	"	Columbia River, East Kootenay	BC	rapids	82L/10	49°55′26″N	115°45′22″W	earliest documented use of "Skookumchuck", by explorer David Thompson; location is approximate as uncharted in BC Basemap
Skookumchuck Rapids	"	Shuswap River, just downstream from Mabel Lake	BC	rapids	82L/10	49°50′38″N	116°13′38″W	also Skookumchuck Rapids Provincial Park
Skookumchuck Rapids	"	Jefferson	WA	rapids	Kalaloch Ridge	47.644°N	124.250°W	
Skookumchuck Reservoir	"	Thurston	WA	reservoir	Vail	46.785°N	122.717°W	
Skookumchuck River	"	Lewis	WA	stream	Centralia	46.720°N	122.981°W	
Skookumchuck Spring	"	Douglas	WA	spring	Palisades	47.422°N	119.925°W	
Skookumchuck Trail	"	Grafton	NH	trail	Franconia	44.186°N	71.658°W	
Skookumchuck Work Center	"	Idaho	ID	locale	Dairy Mountain	45.696°N	116.123°W	
Skookumhouse Butte	"prison", "jail"	Curry	OR	summit	Quosatana Butte	42.480°N	124.212°W	
Skookumhouse Canyon	"	Curry	OR	valley	Quosatana Butte	42.488°N	124.206°W	
Skookumhouse Prairie	"	Curry	OR	flat	Soldier Camp Mountain	42.519°N	124.202°W	
Skookumschuck	"	Prince of Wales – Hyder	AK	gut	Craig D-4	55.913°N	133.313°W	
Skukum Creek	see Skookum	Southeast Fairbanks	AK	stream	Eagle A-1	64.077°N	141.218°W	
Skukum Group	see Skookum		BC/YT	volcanic group		60°N	134°W	
Slatechuck Creek	"slate creek"	Haida Gwaii	BC	stream	103F1	53.24°N	132.25°W	the slate referred to is black argillite, used in Haida carving and found only in this creek basin
Slatechuck Mountain	"	Haida Gwaii	BC	summit	103F4	53.25°N	132.25°W	
Snass Creek	"rain"	Manning Park	BC	creek				
Snass Mountain	"	Manning Park	BC	mountain				
Spatsum	"basket-making grass"	Thompson	BC	rail siding		50° 33.56'N	121° 17.75'W	

== T ==
Placename	Meaning	County/region	State/province	Type	USGS Quad/NTS topo	Latitude	Longitude	Comments
Taghum	"six"	West Kootenay	BC	community				six miles from the confluence of the Slocan and Kootenay Rivers and/or six miles (10 km) west of Nelson, British Columbia
Tamanawas Falls	"spirit, power, sorcerer"	Hood River	OR	falls	Dog River	45.401°N	121.588°W	
Tamanos Mountain	"spirit, power"	Pierce	WA	summit	Chinook Pass	46.872°N	121.596°W	
Tatoosh Buttes	"breasts", "chest"	Okanogan	WA	summit	Tatoosh Buttes	48.902°N	120.541°W	can also mean "milk" but in topographic terms almost invariably "breasts" or "teats"
Tatoosh Creek	"	Lewis	WA	stream	Mount Rainier West	46.766°N	121.763°W	
Tatoosh Hills	"	Skamania	WA	summit	Gumboot Mountain	45.855°N	122.186°W	
Tatoosh Island	"	Clallam	WA	island	Cape Flattery	48.393°N	124.737°W	
Tatoosh Islands	"	Ketchikan Gateway	AK	island	Ketchikan C-6	55.522°N	131.841°W	
Tatoosh Creek	"	Lewis	WA	stream	Mount Rainier West	46.766°N	121.763°W	
Tatoosh Lakes	"	Lewis	WA	lake	Tatoosh Lakes	46.715°N	121.677°W	
Tatoosh Lookout	"	Lewis	WA	locale	Tatoosh Lakes	46.706°N	121.663°W	
Tatoosh Point	"	Ketchikan Gateway	AK	cape	Ketchikan C-6 SE	55.529°N	131.824°W	
Tatoosh Range	"	Lewis	WA	range	Mount Rainier East	46.757°N	121.719°W	
Tatoosh Ridge	"	Lewis	WA	ridge	Tatoosh Lakes	46.723°N	121.661°W	
Tatoosh Ridge Lookout	"	Lewis	WA	locale	Tatoosh Lakes	46.706°N	121.663°W	
Tatoosh Rocks	"	Ketchikan Gateway	AK	area	Ketchikan C-6	55.533°N	131.849°W	
Tatoosh Trail	"	Lewis	WA	trail	Tatoosh Lakes	46.673°N	121.664°W	
Tatoosh Trailhead	"	Lewis	WA	locale	Tatoosh Lakes	46.669°N	121.633°W	
Tatoosh Wilderness	"	Lewis	WA	park	Tatoosh Lakes	46.700°N	121.668°W	
Teahwhit Head	"leg, foot"	La Push	WA	headland	La Push, WA	47.872°N	124.609°W	
Tenas Camp (historical)	"small, little, young"	Hood River	OR	locale	Tanner Butte	45.604°N	121.879°W	
Tenas Creek	"	Valdez–Cordova	AK	stream	Valdez B-2	61.434°N	144.446°W	
Tenas Creek	"	Birkenhead River, near Pemberton	BC	stream	92J/7			
Tenas Creek	"	Bulkley River, near Smithers	BC	stream	93L/11			
Tenas Creek	"	Benewah	ID	stream	Sanders	47.073°N	116.765°W	
Tenas Creek	"	Chelan	WA	stream	Pinnacle Mountain	48.188°N	120.684°W	
Tenas Creek	"	Pierce	WA	stream	Sawtooth Ridge	46.748°N	121.937°W	
Tenas Creek	"	Skagit	WA	stream	Prairie Mountain	48.324°N	121.439°W	
Tenas Creek	"	Ross River, near Faro	YT	stream	105K/1	62°02′35″N	132°20′20″W	
Tenas George Canyon	"little George", "young George"	Chelan	WA	valley	Rocky Reach Dam	47.572°N	120.258°W	could be someone who was called "little George", or a child named George
Tenas Hill	"	Skeena River, near Hazelton	BC	summit	93M/5			
Tenas Island	"	Tolmie Channel, between Princess Royal Island and Sarah Island	BC	island	103A/10			
Tenas Lake	"	Matanuska-Susitna	AK	lake	Healy A-1	63.187°N	147.189°W	
Tenas Lake	"	Atnarko River, near Bella Coola	BC	lake	93C/4			
Tenas Lake	"	Birkenhead River, near Pemberton	BC	lake	93C/4	52°9′35″N	125°42′45″W	
Tenas Lake	"	Lillooet River, just downstream from Lillooet Lake	BC	lake	92J/2			Tenas Lake is a.k.a. Little Lillooet Lake, which is joined to Lillooet Lake by Tenas Narrows since raising of lake level
Tenas Lake	"	Mason	WA	lake	Mount Washington	47.504°N	123.160°W	
Tenas Lakes	"	Lane	OR	lake	Linton Lake	44.229°N	121.917°W	
Tenas Mary Creek	"little Mary"	Ferry	WA	stream	Toroda	48.955°N	118.768°W	either a child named Mary, or an adult nicknamed "little Mary"
Tenas Mountain	"	Okanogan	WA	summit	Brewster	48.088°N	119.869°W	
Tenas Narrows	"	Lillooet River, between Lillooet Lake and Tenas Lake, which is a.k.a. Little Lillooet Lake)	BC	narrows	92J/2			
Tenas Peak	"	Garibaldi Ranges-Lillooet River	BC	summit	92G/15			
Tenas Peak	"	Douglas	OR	summit	Tolo Mountain	43.324°N	122.035°W	
Tenas Peak Lookout Station	"	Douglas	OR	locale	Tolo Mountain	43.325°N	122.035°W	
Tenas Tikke Glacier	"small desire/need", "small request"	Tatshenshini-Alsek	BC	glacier	114P/6			Tikke Glacier is nearby; tikke is usually ticky or tikegh
Tenasillahe Island	"little land", i.e. "island"	Clatsop	OR	island	Cathlamet	46.229°N	123.455°W	
Tenaskli Creek	"little joy", "small joke"	Bowron River	BC	stream	093H13	53°51′00″N	121°55′00″W	could be Carrier, rather than Chinook, but klee in Chinook is from Engl. "glee", usually means happiness or joke
Tenass Island	"little, small", i.e. "island"	Prince of Wales – Hyder	AK	island	Craig D-4	55.998°N	133.296°W	
Tenass Lake	"	Mississagi River, near Sault Ste. Marie	ON	lake	041J/5	46°26′38″N	83°37′13″W	
Tenass Pass	"little, small", i.e. "island"	Prince of Wales – Hyder	AK	island	Petersburg A-5	56.000°N	133.342°W	
Tilikum Crossing	"people, friend, kin"	Multnomah	OR	bridge	Portland	45.506°N	122.665°W	
Tillicum	"	The Gorge, Victoria	BC	community	92B/6	48°27′5″N	123°24′3″W	also Tillicum Mall
Tillicum	"	Pierce	WA	town/city	Fort Lewis	47.124°N	122.556°W	
Tillicum Beach	"	Lincoln	OR	town/city	Yachats	44.363°N	124.092°W	
Tillicum Beach	"	Island	WA	locale	Langley	48.103°N	122.399°W	
Tillicum Beach Recreation Site	"	Lincoln	OR	locale	Yachats	44.366°N	124.091°W	
Tillicum Campground	"	Skamania	WA	locale	Lone Butte	46.123°N	121.779°W	
Tillicum Bay	"	Sechelt Inlet	BC	bay	92G/12	49°32′0″N	123°46′0″W	in "Greater Sechelt"
Tillicum Bay	"	Parry Sound	ON	bay	31L/3	46°12′23″N	79°29′19″W	near North Bay
Tillicum Creek	"	Pend-d'Oreille River	BC	bay	82F/3	49°2′0″N	117°25′0″W	14 km E of Trail
Tillicum Creek	"	Umatilla	OR	stream	Huron	45.481°N	118.304°W	
Tillicum Creek	"	Chelan	WA	stream	Huckleberry Mountain	43.794°N	122.295°W	
Tillicum Creek	"	Lane	OR	stream	Chumstick Mountain	47.748°N	120.393°W	
Tillicum Creek	"	Pend Oreille	WA	stream	Orwig Hump	48.725°N	117.069°W	
Tillicum Creek	"	Skamania	WA	stream	Quartz Creek Butte	46.180°N	121.831°W	
Tillicum Elementary School	"	Victoria	BC	school	Vancouver Island			
Tillicum Elementary School	"	Pierce	WA	school	Steilacoom	47.126°N	122.552°W	
Tillicum Junior High School	"	King	WA	school	Issaquah	47.599°N	122.124°W	
Tillicum Mine	"	Grant	OR	mine	Granite	44.857°N	118.381°W	
Tillicum Peak	"	Pend Oreille	WA	summit	Monumental Mountain	48.729°N	117.152°W	
Tillicum Point	"	Pierce	WA	summit	Mowich Lake	46.906°N	121.827°W	
Tillicum Rock	"	Mason	WA	pillar	Shelton	47.155°N	123.008°W	
Tillicum Siding	"	Pierce	WA	locale	Steilacoom	47.130°N	122.538°W	
Tillicum Village	"	Kitsap	WA	locale	Duwamish Head	47.541°N	122.482°W	
Tillicum Lake	"	Cariboo	BC	lake	93A/3	52°6′0″N	121°26′0″W	50 km E of Williams Lake
Tillicum Mountain	"	Dickson Range, Bridge River Country	BC	summit	92J/14	50°52′39″N	123°15′32″W	
Tillicum Mountain	"	Valhalla Range, Slocan Valley	BC	lake	82F/13	49°59′1″N	117°42′36″W	
Tikke Glacier	"	Tatshenshini-Alsek	BC	glacier	114P/6	59°18′0″N	137°15′0″W	
Tkope Creek	"white"	Tatshenshini-Alsek	BC	stream	114P/55			issues from Tkope Glacier
Tkope Glacier	"white:	Tatshenshini-Alsek	BC	glacier	114P/36			
Tokatee Klootchman State Natural Site	"pretty woman"	Lane	OR	state park				
Toketic	"pretty"	Thompson	BC	whistlestop		50° 32.06'ºN	121° 16.94'	
Toketie Creek	"pretty"	Chelan	WA	stream	Leavenworth	47.522°N	120.717°W	
Toketie Lake	"	Chelan	WA	lake	Leavenworth	47.510°N	120.743°W	
Tolo	"win", "earn", "pay" (as in paycheque)	Jackson	OR	town/city	Sams Valley	42.424°N	122.970°W	
Tolo	"	Kitsap	WA	town/city	Suquamish	47.655°N	122.584°W	
Tolo Creek	"	Douglas	OR	stream	Tolo Mountain	43.299°N	122.057°W	
Tolo Creek	"	Hood River	OR	stream	Badger Lake	45.311°N	121.504°W	
Tolo Creek	"	Chelan	WA	stream	Goode Mountain	48.425°N	120.911°W	
Tolo Lake	"	Idaho	ID	lake	Grangeville West	45.916°N	116.235°W	
Tolo Lake Access Area	"	Idaho	ID	lake	Grangeville West	45.914°N	116.238°W	
Tolo Mountain	"	Orford-Southgate Divide	British Columbia	glacier	92K/10	50°43′36″N	124°31′15″W	in the same area as Kula Kula Peak and Nanitch Peak (q.v.); west of the Compton Neve
Tolo Mountain	"	Douglas	OR	summit	Tolo Mountain	43.319°N	122.012°W	
Tolo Mountain	"	Chelan	WA	summit	Goode Mountain	48.395°N	120.894°W	
Tolo Lake Access Area	"	Jackson	OR	po	Sams Valley	42.424°N	122.970°W	
Tomahnous Creek	"spirit, power"	Tatshenshini-Alsek	BC	stream	114P/44			issues from Tomahnous Glacier
Tomahnous Glacier	"	Tatshenshini-Alsek	BC	glacier	114P/45			tomahnous is usually tamahnous, sometimes tamanass or tamanawass/tamanawaz
Towagh Creek	"shining, bright"	Tatshenshini-Alsek	BC	stream	114P/43			issues from Tomahnous Glacier
Towagh Glacier	"	Tatshenshini-Alsek	BC	glacier	114P/44			
Tsee Creek	"sweet"	Shalalth	BC	stream	92J/9	50°43′41″N	122°13′12″W	when in reference to water, tsee can mean "fresh" or "potable"; this is a semi-arid area with few streams, so that is its probable reference
Tsiatko Glacier	"mountain monster"	Tatshenshini-Alsek	BC	glacier	114P/35			tsiatko is something like a sasquatch
Tukwila	"nut", "hazelnut"	King	WA	city				
Tum Lake	"heart, heartbeat, soul/mind, feeling"	Deschutes	OR	lake	Broken Top	44.034°N	121.638°W	tum is possibly short for tumwater ("waterfall") rather than tumtum
Tumtum, Washington	"heart, heartbeat, soul/mind, feeling"	Stevens	WA	town/city	Tumtum	47.892°N	117.682°W	
Tumtum Creek	"	North Thompson River	BC	stream	82M/14			55 km NE of Clearwaterf
Tumtum Lake	"	Adams River	BC	lake	82M/14			70 km NE of Clearwater, British Columbia; not connected to Tumtum Creek but nearby)
Tumtum Lake	"	Harney	OR	lake	Tumtum Lake	42.140°N	118.585°W	
Tumtum Mountain	"	Clark	WA	summit	Yale Dam	45.935°N	122.335°W	
Tumtum Peak	"	Pierce	WA	summit	Wahpenayo Peak	46.750°N	121.868°W	
Tumtum River	"	Lincoln	OR	stream	Marys Peak	44.589°N	123.511°W	
Tumwata Creek	"waterfall"	Jefferson	WA	stream	Hunger Mountain	47.883°N	124.105°W	
Tumwater (historical)	"waterfall"	Wasco	OR	locale	Wishram	45.648°N	120.963°W	
Tumwater	"waterfall"	Thurston	WA	town/city	Tumwater	47.008°N	122.908°W	
Tumwater Basin	"	Okanogan	WA	basin	Stubblefield Point	48.101°N	119.461°W	
Tumwater Botanical Area	"	Chelan	WA	area	Leavenworth	47.621°N	120.708°W	
Tumwater Bridge	"	Chelan	WA	bridge	McGregor Mountain	48.391°N	120.844°W	
Tumwater Butte	"	Klickitat	WA	summit	Lone Pine Butte	45.914°N	120.531°W	
Tumwater Campground	"	Chelan	WA	locale	Winton/McGregor Mountain	47.677°N	120.732°W	
Tumwater Canyon	"	Chelan	WA	valley	Leavenworth	47.585°N	120.677°W	
Tumwater Canyon Dam	"	Chelan	WA	dam	Leavenworth	47.617°N	120.722°W	
Tumwater Corral Spring	"	Klickitat	WA	spring	Lone Pine Butte	45.920°N	120.541°W	
Tumwater Creek	"	Clallam	WA	stream	Port Angeles	48.123°N	120123.445°W	
Tumwater Creek	"	Lewis	WA	stream	Cowlitz Falls	46.467°N	122.112°W	
Tumwater Creek	"	Okanogan	WA	stream	Stubblefield Point	48.080°N	119.460°W	
Tumwater Falls	"	Sherman	OR	falls	Quinton	45.659°N	120.501°W	
Tumwater Falls Dam	"	Thurston	WA	dam	Tumwater	47.015°N	122.903°W	
Tumwater Lake	"	King	WA	lake	Grotto	47.632°N	121.403°W	
Tumwater Lake	"	Thurston	WA	school	Maytown	46.992°N	122.924°W	
Tumwater Mountain	"	Chelan	WA	summit	Leavenworth	47.616°N	120.700°W	
Tumwater Mountain	"	Chelan	WA	summit	Leavenworth	47.616°N	120.700°W	
Tumwater Mountain	"	Lewis	WA	summit	Cowlitz Falls	46.428°N	122.103°W	
Tyee	"chief, big, boss"	Skagway-Hoonah–Angoon	AK	town/city	Sitka A-2	57.041°N	134.543°W	
Tyee	"	Skeena Estuary, near Prince Rupert	BC	railway point	103I/4	54°12′0″N	129°57′0″W	opposite Port Essington
Tyee	"	Douglas	OR	town/city	Tyee	43.444°N	123.550°W	
Tyee Bank	"	Skeena Estuary, near Prince Rupert	BC	bank	103I/4	54°11′0″N	129°59′0″W	opposite Port Essington
Tyee Bar	"	Josephine	OR	bar	Bunker Creek	42.658°N	123.656°W	
Tyee Beach	"	Island	WA	town/city	Langley	48.093°N	122.384°W	
Tyee Butte	"	N shore Cheslatta Lake	BC	summit	Lick Creek	53°43′59″N	125°31′0″W	
Tyee Butte	"	Wallowa	OR	summit	Lick Creek	45.177°N	117.014°W	
Tyee Camp	"	Douglas	OR	locale	Tyee	43.439°N	123.575°W	
Tyee City	"	Humboldt	CA	town/city	Tyee City	40.923°N	124.126°W	
Tyee Cove	"	Clark	NV	bay	Mount Davis	35.619°N	114.669°W	
Tyee Creek	"	Wrangell-Petersburg Borough	AK	stream	Bradfield Canal A-5	56.213°N	131.526°W	
Tyee Creek	"	Ruby Range, near Bonanza Pass	BC	stream	82K/4	44.918°N	116.000°W	S of Nakusp-Slocan divide (Bonanza Pass)
Tyee Creek	"	Ladysmith	BC	stream	92G/4	49°0"N	123°49′0″W	
Tyee Creek	"	Valley	ID	stream	McCall	44.918°N	116.000°W	
Tyee Creek	"	Deschutes	OR	stream	South Sister	44.036°N	121.763°W	
Tyee Creek	"	Wallowa	OR	stream	Lick Creek	45.220°N	117.004°W	
Tyee Creek	"	Chelan	WA	stream	Tyee Mountain	47.829°N	120.415°W	
Tyee Glacier	"	Mamquam Mountain, near Squamish	BC	glacier	92G/15	49°48′18″N	122°53′36″W	
Tyee High School	"	King	WA	school	Des Moines	47.436°N	122.276°W	
Tyee Hill	"	Clallam	WA	summit	Lake Pleasant	48.086°N	124.343°W	
Tyee Lake	"	Wrangell-Petersburg Borough	AK	lake	Bradfield Canal A-5	56.191°N	131.481°W	
Tyee Lake	"	Cariboo, N of Williams Lake	BC	lake	93B/8	52°22′34″N	122°4′49″W	
Tyee Lake	"	40 km NW of Summit Lake	BC	lake	93B/8	54°33′15″N	123°2′22″W	75 km NNW of Prince George
Tyee Lakes	"	Inyo	CA	lake	Mount Thompson	37.181°N	118.578°W	
Tyee Middle School	"	King	WA	school	Mercer Island	47.574°N	122.156°W	
Tyee Mine	"	Stevens	WA	mine	Deep Lake	48.858°N	117.619°W	
Tyee Mountain	"	Gold River, W of Campbell River	BC	summit	92F/13	49°58′46″N	125°53′39″W	on divide between Gold, Heber and Salmon Rivers.
Tyee Mountain	"	Boise	ID	summit	Tyee Mountain	44.018°N	115.303°W	
Tyee Mountain	"	Douglas	OR	summit	Tyee Mountain	43.433°N	123.460°W	
Tyee Mountain	"	Chelan	WA	summit	Tyee Mountain	47.855°N	120.470°W	
Tyee Mountain Recreation Area	"	Douglas	OR	locale	Tyee Mountain	43.486°N	123.483°W	
Tyee Park Elementary School	"	Pierce	WA	school	Steilacoom	47.149°N	122.507°W	
Tyee Peak	"	Pierce	WA	summit	Mowich Lake	46.963°N	121.766°W	
Tyee Point	"	Horseshoe Bay	BC	cape	92G/6	49°22′51″N	123°16′28″W	
Tyee Point	"	West Thurlow Island, Johnstone Strait	BC	cape	92K/5	50°23′16″N	125°47′3″W	
Tyee Pool Camp	"	Snohomish	WA	locale	Bedal	48.068°N	121.407°W	
Tyee Post Office (historical)	"	Douglas	OR	po	Tyee	43.444°N	123.550°W	
Tyee Prairie	"	Clallam	WA	flat	Lake Pleasant	48.051°N	124.358°W	
Tyee Rapids	"	Josephine	OR	rapids	Bunker Creek	42.656°N	123.663°W	
Tyee Recreation Site	"	Lane	OR	locale	Florence	43.882°N	124.122°W	
Tyee Ridge	"	Chelan	WA	ridge	Tyee Mountain	47.816°N	120.459°W	also Tyee Ridge Spring Nos. 1-3, 6-8 in situ
Tyee Shoal	"	Kitsap	WA	bar	Duwamish Head	47.611°N	122.485°W	
Tyee Spit	"	Campbell River	BC	spit	92K/3	50°3′0″N	125°15′26″W	Campbell River Airfield
Tyee Springs	"	Skamania	WA	spring	Termination Point	45.875°N	121.970°W	
Tyee Valley Golf Course	"	King	WA	locale	Des Moines	47.428°N	122.310°W	
Tyee View Cemetery	"	Douglas	OR	cemetery	Tyee Mountain	43.404°N	123.426°W	
Tyeen Glacierl	"	Skagway-Hoonah–Angoon	AK	glacier	Mount Fairweather D-4	58.868°N	137.179°W	probably Tlingit, but possibly Chinook adaptation
Tyhee	"chief, big, boss"	Bannock	ID	town/city	Pocatello North	42.952°N	112.466°W	
Tyhee Creek	"	Telkwa	BC	stream	93L/11	54°41′2″N	127°1′44″W	
Tyhee Elementary School	"	Bannock	ID	school	Pocatello North	42.949°N	112.470°W	
Tyhee Lake	"	Telkwa	BC	lake	93L/11	54°42′59″N	127°2′35″W	Aso Tyhee Lake Provincial Park
Tyhee Lateral	"	Bannock	ID	canal	Michaud	42.950°N	112.508°W	
Tyhee Wasteway	"	Bannock	ID	canal	Pocatello North	42.962°N	112.465°W	
Tzum Point	"painted, marked, spotted"	Bear Lake, Takla Country	ID	canal	Pocatello North	56°5′24″N	126°47′27″W	110 km NE of Hazelton;tzum is often spelled chum (q.v.)

== W ==
Placename	Meaning	County/region	State/province	Type	USGS Quad/NTS topo	Latitude	Longitude	Comments
Wake Creek	"not, nothing"	Tillamook	OR	stream	Blaine	45.256°N	123.656°W	
Wakepish Creek	"no fish"	Skamania	WA	stream	French Butte	46.324°N	121.971°W	
Waketickeh Creek	"don't want", "don't need"	Mason	WA	stream	Eldon	47.559°N	123.024°W	

== Y ==
Placename	Meaning	County/region	State/province	Type	USGS Quad/NTS topo	Latitude	Longitude	Comments
Yakawawa Canyon	"it talks"	Whitman	WA	valley	Granite Point	46.576°N	117.288°W	yaka means "it, he, she", wawa is "speech" or "to talk". Presumably named because the canyon's river is loud, or because the canyon has an echo
Yukwah Recreation Site	"here", "this place", "this thing here"	Linn	OR	locale	Upper Soda	44.400°N	122.337°W	usually yukwa

== See also ==
- Chinook Jargon
- Owyhee
- Kanaka
- Skookumchuck
- Skookum
- Tillicum
