= Mount Skook Davidson =

Mountain in Canada

- Location within British Columbia
- Interactive map of Mount Skook Davidson

Highest point
- Elevation: 2,382 m (7,815 ft)
- Prominence: 1,361 m (4,465 ft)
- Coordinates: 58°40′54″N 127°19′57″W

Geography
- Location: British Columbia, Canada
- District: Cassiar Land District
- Parent range: Kechika Ranges
- Topo map: NTS 94L11 Denetiah Creek

Mount Skook Davidson, 2,382 metres (7,815 ft), is a mountain in the Kechika Ranges of the Cassiar Mountains in far northern British Columbia, Canada. It overlooks the "Diamond J Ranch", which was founded by John Ogilvie Davidson also known as "Skook" Davidson or "Skookum" Davidson because of his stature (big and strong, see skookum). Davidson was a notable local pioneer who worked as a land surveyor before taking up packing, guiding, and ranching in this area. He helped discover and select the route for the Alaska Highway.

== See also ==
- List of Chinook Jargon placenames

== Prominence ==
Its topographic prominence is 1361m above its col at Denetiah Lake.
