= Skookumchuck =

Skookumchuck (/ˈskuːkəmtʃʌk/) is a Chinook Jargon term that is in common use in British Columbia English and occurs in Pacific Northwest English. Skookum means "strong" or "powerful", and "chuck" means water, so skookumchuck means "rapids" or "whitewater" (literally, "strong water"), or fresh, healthy water. It can mean any rapids, but in coastal usage refers to the powerful tidal rapids at the mouths of most of the major coastal inlets.

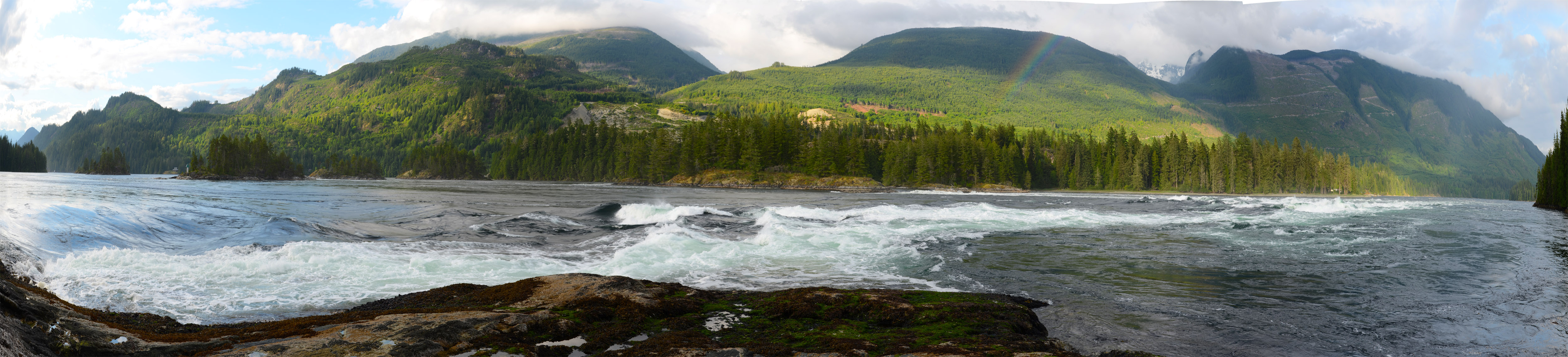
Saltwater tidal rapids of Skookumchuck Narrows

Places named Skookumchuck include:

- Skookumchuck, British Columbia, a town in British Columbia named for the large rapids in this area on the Kootenay River.
- Skookumchuck Hot Springs, British Columbia, a town in British Columbia
- Skookumchuck Narrows, a narrow entrance passage into Sechelt Inlet, a fjord in British Columbia's Sunshine Coast
- Skookumchuck Narrows Provincial Park, a park at the narrows
- Skookumchuck Rapids Provincial Park, a park near Mabel Lake, British Columbia
- Skookumchuck River, a river in southwestern Washington
- Skookumchuck, Thurston County, Washington, a populated place
- Skookumchuck Creek, Kittitas County, Washington
- Skookumchuck Creek, Idaho County, Idaho
- Skookumchuck Brook, Franconia, New Hampshire
- Skookumchuck Trail, Franconia, New Hampshire

Tidal rapids termed skookumchucks include:

- Quatsino Narrows

== See also ==
- List of Chinook Jargon placenames
- Chinook Jargon use by English-language speakers
