= Klootchman Canyon =

Natural feature in British Columbia, Canada

Coordinates: 57°32′00″N 131°44′00″W

Klootchman Canyon is a canyon on the Stikine River in northwestern British Columbia, Canada, located south of a bend in the river known as the Devil's Elbow.

Klootchman Canyon is also an alternate but unofficial name for Klootch Canyon on the Skeena River.

== See also ==
- List of Chinook Jargon placenames
