= Keekwulee Falls =

Waterfall in the U.S. state of Washington

- Interactive map of Keekwulee Falls
- Location: Washington, United States
- Coordinates: 47.4307°N 121.4532°W

Keekwulee Falls is a waterfall on Denny Creek in the U.S. state of Washington, approximately two miles west of Snoqualmie Pass, and located within the Alpine Lakes Wilderness Area.

== Name ==
Keekwulee Falls was named in 1916 by a group of hikers from The Mountaineers, a Washington-based club for outdoor recreation. It was named for the Chinook Jargon word keekwulee, variously spelled keekwillie and kikwəli, which is often translated as "to fall down", but is understood by contemporary references as a preposition meaning "low, below, under, down." It is also used in verbal phrases meaning "to lower," "to put down," or "to descend." The Chinook Jargon word is derived from the Chinookan word gíkʷli, meaning "down" or "below."

== Attributes ==
The waterfall has two drops, one 90 feet (27 m) and one 35 feet (11 m), with a combined drop of approximately 125 feet (38 m). There is a viewpoint of the falls from the Denny Creek trail.

== See also ==
- List of waterfalls in Washington
- List of Chinook Jargon place names
