= Skookum =

Chinook Jargon word

Skookum is a Chinook Jargon word that has been in widespread historical use in British Columbia and the Yukon, as well as the Pacific Northwest. It has a range of meanings, commonly associated with an English translation of strong or monstrous. The word can mean strong, greatest, powerful, ultimate, or brave. Something can be skookum, meaning "strong" or "monstrously significant". When used in reference to another person, e.g. "he's skookum", it conveys connotations of reliability or a monstrous nature, as well as strength, size or a hard-working nature. DCHP-3 classifies skookum as a Type 4 Canadianism, by virtue of cultural significance.

== Derivative words ==
Skookum house means "jail" or "prison'" (cf. the English euphemism the big house, but here meaning "strong house"). Skookum tumtum, lit. "strong heart", is generally translated as "brave" or possibly "good-hearted". In Chinook Jargon, skookum is a verb auxiliary, used similarly to can or to be able. Another compound, though fallen out of use in modern British Columbia English, is skookum lacasset or "strongbox".

Skookumchuck means "turbulent water" or "rapids in a stream or river", literally "strong water" (chuck is Chinook Jargon for "water", "stream" or "lake"). It is a common placename in British Columbia, Washington and Idaho. The term is used for tidal-exchange rapids at the mouths of inlets and bays, a regular feature of the Inside Passage, especially Skookumchuck Narrows.

== Monsters ==
A skookum is a variety of mountain giant or monster similar to the Sasquatch or Bigfoot. In the surviving Chinuk-Wawa spoken in Grand Ronde, Oregon, this variant is pronounced differently—skoo-KOOM—but when used in English with this meaning, it is pronounced the same way as the "big and strong" meaning.

Skookums were bad spirits or devils of which crows, eagles, owls, blue jays, various beasts and reptiles could be representations. They could inhabit people and cause serious illness.

== Dolls ==
A derivative usage of the skookum-as-monster context was the application of the name to a souvenir Skookum doll, sometimes simply called "a skookum". Mary McAboy first started making Skookum dolls in 1913 and received a patent for them in 1914. They were popular from the early 1920s until the 1960s. They were factory-made dolls that resembled Native American people and were sold to tourists at trading posts in the western United States.

Early dolls heads were made of dried apples with the bodies made of wood and stuffed with either leaves, straw, twigs or grass stuffed in a muslin sack. Later the dolls were composition dolls and had mohair wigs. Later dolls were made of plastic and had plastic brown shoes. They have "Indian style" blankets as part of their attire. Some had jewelry such as beaded necklaces or earrings. Some dolls have feathered headdresses. The sizes of the dolls ranged from babies inside of cradle boards to large, human size store display dolls. The rule of thumb is the larger the doll, the more valuable/rare they are. The most common sizes range from about seven inches to about 12 inches tall. Skookums were widely imitated. Minnetonka, Milbros or Minnehaha dolls are similar, but not the same. Most Skookum dolls were made so they look to the right. Skookums do not have arms: they are wrapped with blankets and have the suggestion of arms. Skookums never have gray hair, as in "elders". Skookums should have the words "Skookum" either stamped on their brown plastic shoes or a tag with "Skookum" on their foot in the case of the older versions.

== Other uses ==
Skookum, either alone or in the combination skookumchuck, occurs in dozens of placenames throughout the Pacific Northwest region and beyond. A short form used with personal names, "Skook", is found on the map of British Columbia at Mount Skook Davidson near the confluence of the Kechika and Gataga Rivers in northern British Columbia and Mount Skook Jim, near the head of the Stein River in the northern Lillooet Ranges between Pemberton and Lytton. Local lore in any area of British Columbia may have a Skookum Charlie or a Skookum Brown; the most famous of such nicknames was that of Skookum Jim, one of the co-discoverers of the Klondike goldfields in the Yukon. It is also the name given to a famous 1909 Baldwin 2-4-4-2 Mallet type logging locomotive. That locomotive, Columbia River Belt Line Number 7, is notable both for being the first Mallet built by the company for logging purposes, and for having been saved from its planned scrapping by getting into an accident that caused it to be stranded in the woods until preservationists could purchase and restore it. In Ernest Thompson Seton's book Rolf in the Woods, Quonab's series of pet dogs are named Skookum. In Alaska there is a Skookum Glacier, River, Creek, and Road.

== See also ==
- Skookumchuck
- List of Chinook Jargon place names (places with "Skookum" in their names)
- Skukum Group
- Da kine, a roughly similar phrase used in Hawaiian Pidgin English
- Hella, slang used originally and primarily in Northern California
