= Stump Lake =

Lake in British Columbia, Canada

- Location within British Columbia
- Location: Nicola Country, British Columbia Interior
- Coordinates: 50°22′00″N 120°22′00″W
- Basin countries: Canada
- Settlements: Stump Lake

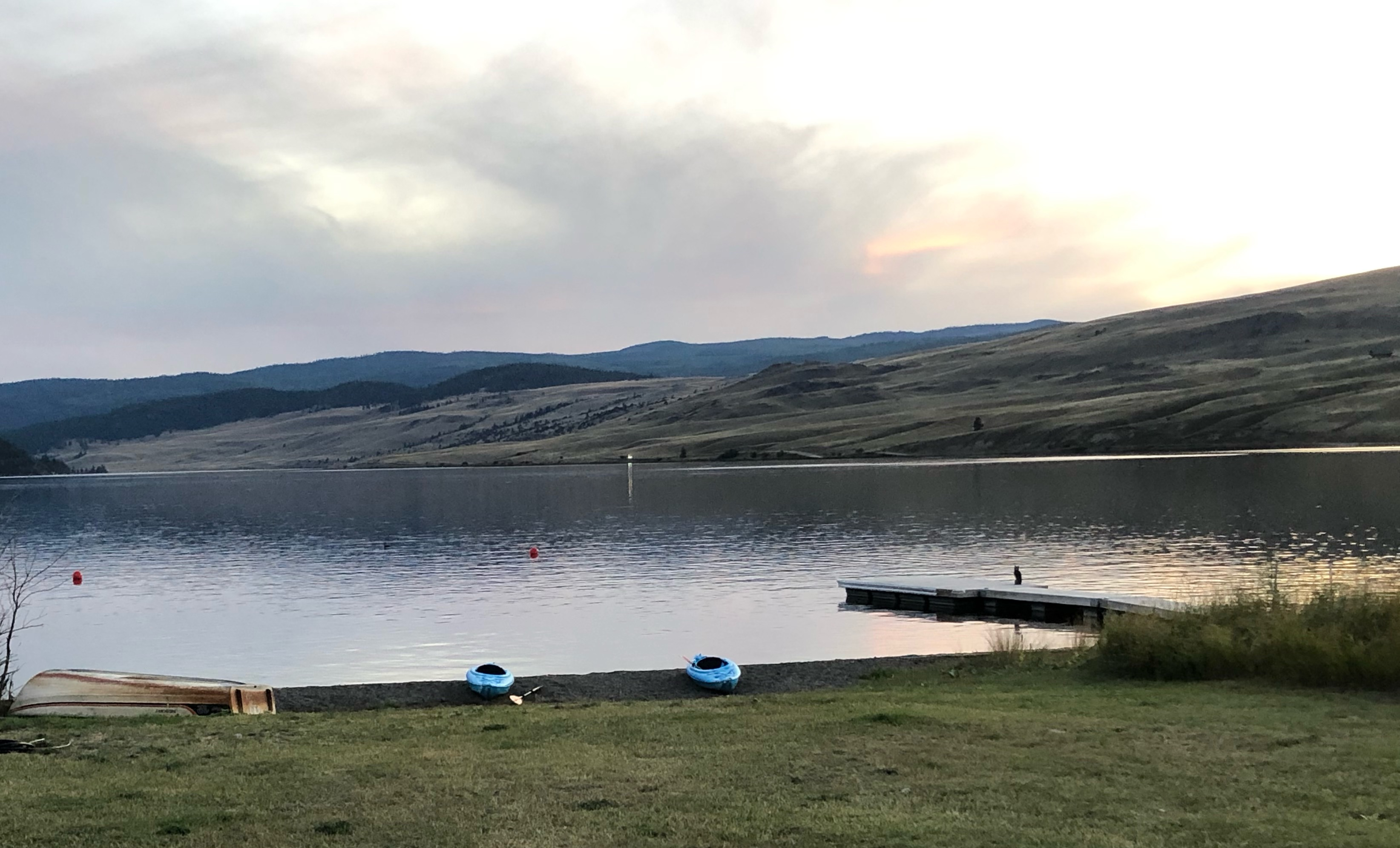

Stump Lake is a lake in the Nicola Country region of the South-Central Interior of British Columbia, Canada, northeast from and of a smaller size to Nicola Lake at approximately 11 km long. Stump Lake is the location of the community of Stump Lake and is important in local native history as one of the original settlement sites of the alliance of Okanagan and Nlaka'pamux people today known as the Nicola people. Stump Lake is a short 53 km distance north of Merritt on the Old Merritt Highway (5A). The lake, which is popular for fishing, boating, and outdoor water recreation, is home to the historic Stump Lake Ranch and is rich in ranching.

== See also ==
- List of lakes of British Columbia
