= Mabel Lake Provincial Park =

Provincial park in British Columbia, Canada

- IUCN category II (national park)
- Location within British Columbia
- Interactive map of Mabel Lake Provincial Park
- Location: British Columbia, Canada
- Nearest city: Vernon
- Coordinates: 50°27′29″N 118°43′29″W
- Area: 1.87 km^{2} (0.72 sq mi)
- Established: December 21, 1972
- Governing body: BC Parks

Mabel Lake Provincial Park is a provincial park in the Monashee Mountains of British Columbia, Canada, located on the east side of Mabel Lake, which is part of the Shuswap River system. Created on December 21, 1972, at approximately 182 hectares, the park was expanded in 2000 to approximately 187 hectares.
