= Mabel Lake =

Lake in British Columbia, Canada

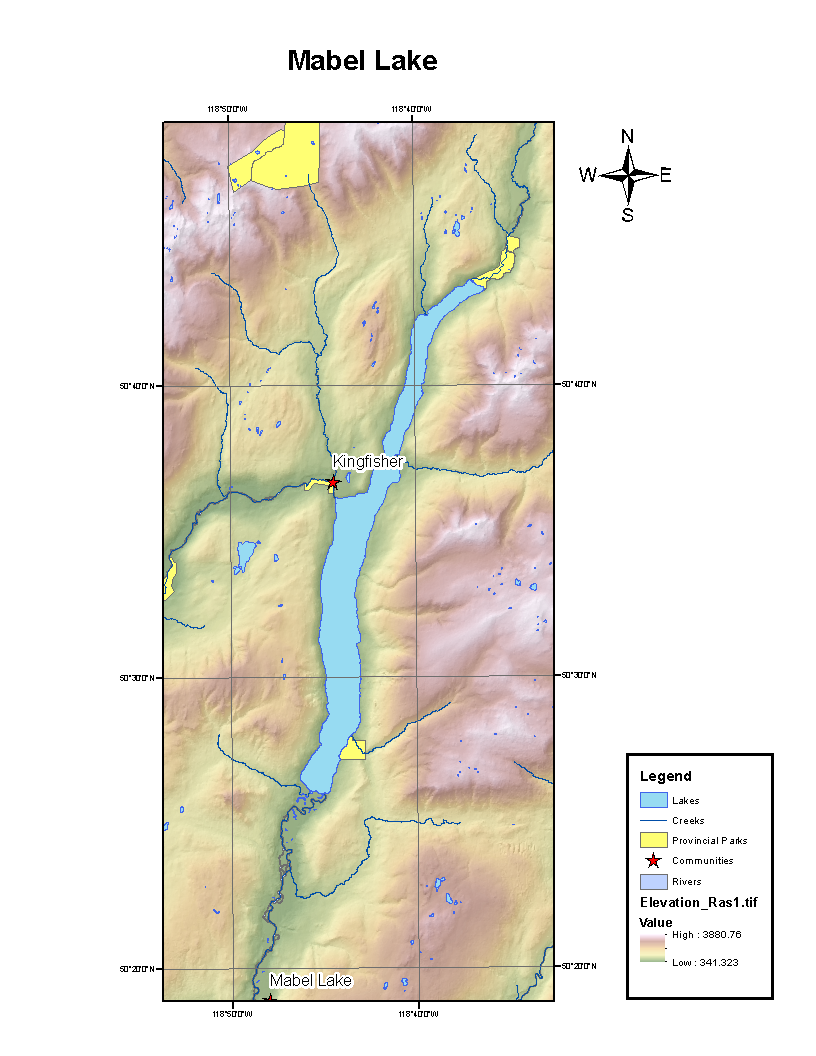

- Location within British Columbia
- Location: south-central British Columbia
- Coordinates: 50°35′N 118°43′W
- Primary inflows: Shuswap River
- Primary outflows: Shuswap River
- Basin countries: Canada
- Max. length: 35 km (22 mi)
- Surface area: 59.9 km^{2} (23.1 sq mi)
- Average depth: 114 m (374 ft)
- Max. depth: 192 m (630 ft)
- Water volume: 6.83 km^{3} (1.64 cu mi)
- Surface elevation: 396 m (1,299 ft)

Mabel Lake is a lake located in southern Interior British Columbia, Canada, that is fed by and drained by the Shuswap River. It is located southeast of Shuswap Lake, northeast of Okanagan Lake, and west of the Monashee Mountains, and is popular for camping and fishing. The area around the lake is mountainous and sparsely populated.

The lake is oriented roughly north to south, and is approximately 35 km long. The Shuswap River flows out of Sugar Lake into the southern end of Mabel Lake, and issues westward from the middle part of the lake into Mara Lake. Despite being part of the Shuswap Lake drainage basin, it is included in the North Okanagan municipal administrative region.

Mabel Lake Provincial Park is situated on the southeastern shore of the lake, about 35 kilometers from the village of Lumby on Lumby-Mabel Lake Road. The road is paved and passes by Shuswap Falls Recreation Area.

Skookumchuck Rapids Provincial Park is on the Shuswap River immediately to the west. The main access road is the Enderby-Mabel Lake Road which runs east from Enderby. The nearest town at the north outlet of the lake is Kingfisher.

The lake has many types of fish, the most popular being salmon and rainbow trout.

== See also ==
- List of lakes of British Columbia
