= Orford River =

Coordinates: 50.5997°N 124.8404°W

The Orford River is a river near the southwest coast of mainland British Columbia, Canada. Its mouth is on the east side of Bute Inlet, about halfway between the head and mouth of the Inlet.

Steelhead salmon (Rainbow trout) are numerous in Orford River, providing food for many grizzly bears. Viewing the bears is a popular activity with visitors, who are generally taken to the area by boats or airplanes operated by tour companies with boarding locations in the town of Campbell River, about 60 kilometres (37 mi) southwest on Vancouver Island and other nearby communities on the island.
