= Stump Lake, British Columbia =

Stump Lake
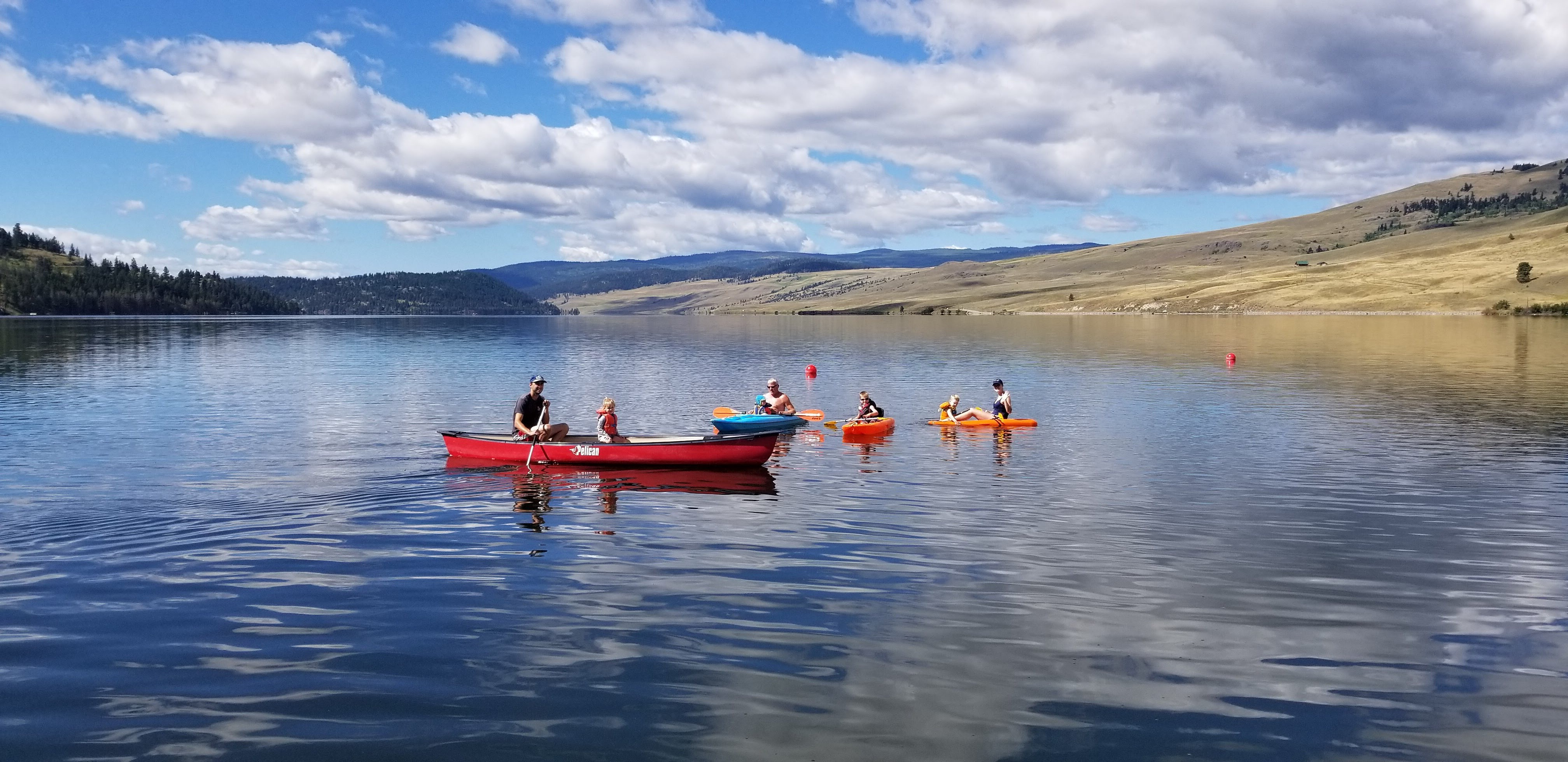
- Location of Stump Lake in British Columbia
- Coordinates: 50°23′00″N 120°20′00″W
- Country: Canada
- Province: British Columbia
- Area codes: 250, 778

Stump Lake is an unincorporated settlement in the Nicola Country of the South-Central Interior of British Columbia, Canada, located 12 km north of Quilchena, also lies to the northeast of Nicola Lake and the city of Merritt. Stump Lake is around 11 km long and located on the Old Merritt Highway (5A). The lake, which is popular for fishing, boating, and outdoor water recreation, is home to the historic Stump Lake Ranch and is rich in ranching and first nation's history as well.
