= Ipsoot Lake =

Lake in Whatcom County, Washington, USA

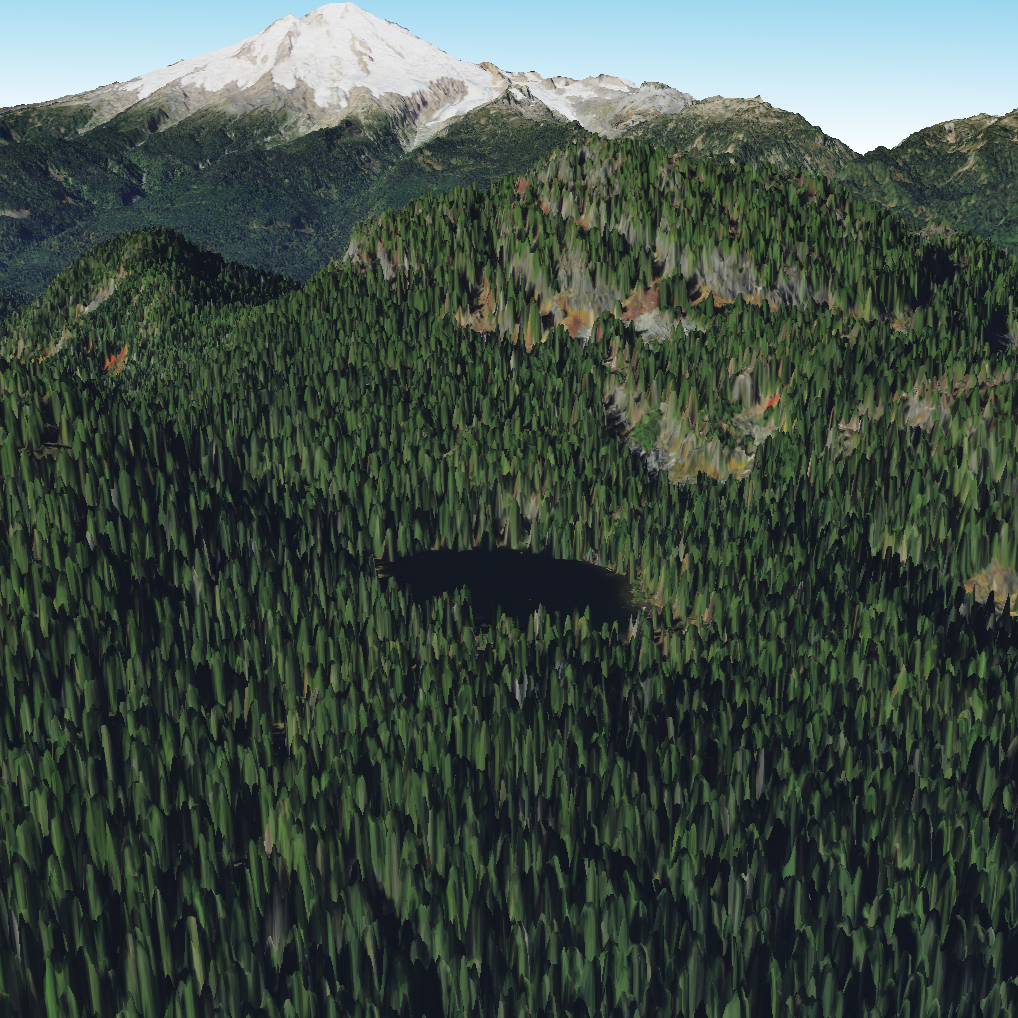
- A render of Ipsoot Lake, with Mount Baker in the background

- Location within Washington (state) Location within the United States
- Location: North Cascades National Park, Whatcom County, Washington, United States
- Coordinates: 48°42′42″N 121°32′23″W
- Lake type: Tarn
- Basin countries: United States
- Surface area: 8.9 acres (3.6 ha)
- Surface elevation: 4,460 ft (1,360 m)

Ipsoot Lake is located in North Cascades National Park, in the U.S. state of Washington. Ipsoot Lake is adjacent to Snoqualmie National Forest and approximately 2 mi (3.2 km) northwest of Green Lake and 1.75 mi (2.82 km) southwest of Hagan Mountain.

The name for the lake comes from the Chinook Jargon word ipsoot meaning "to hide" or "hidden". The lake was originally named Hidden Lake, but was changed to avoid confusion with the other Hidden Lake in the National Forest.
