= Tokatee Klootchman State Natural Site =

State park in Oregon, US

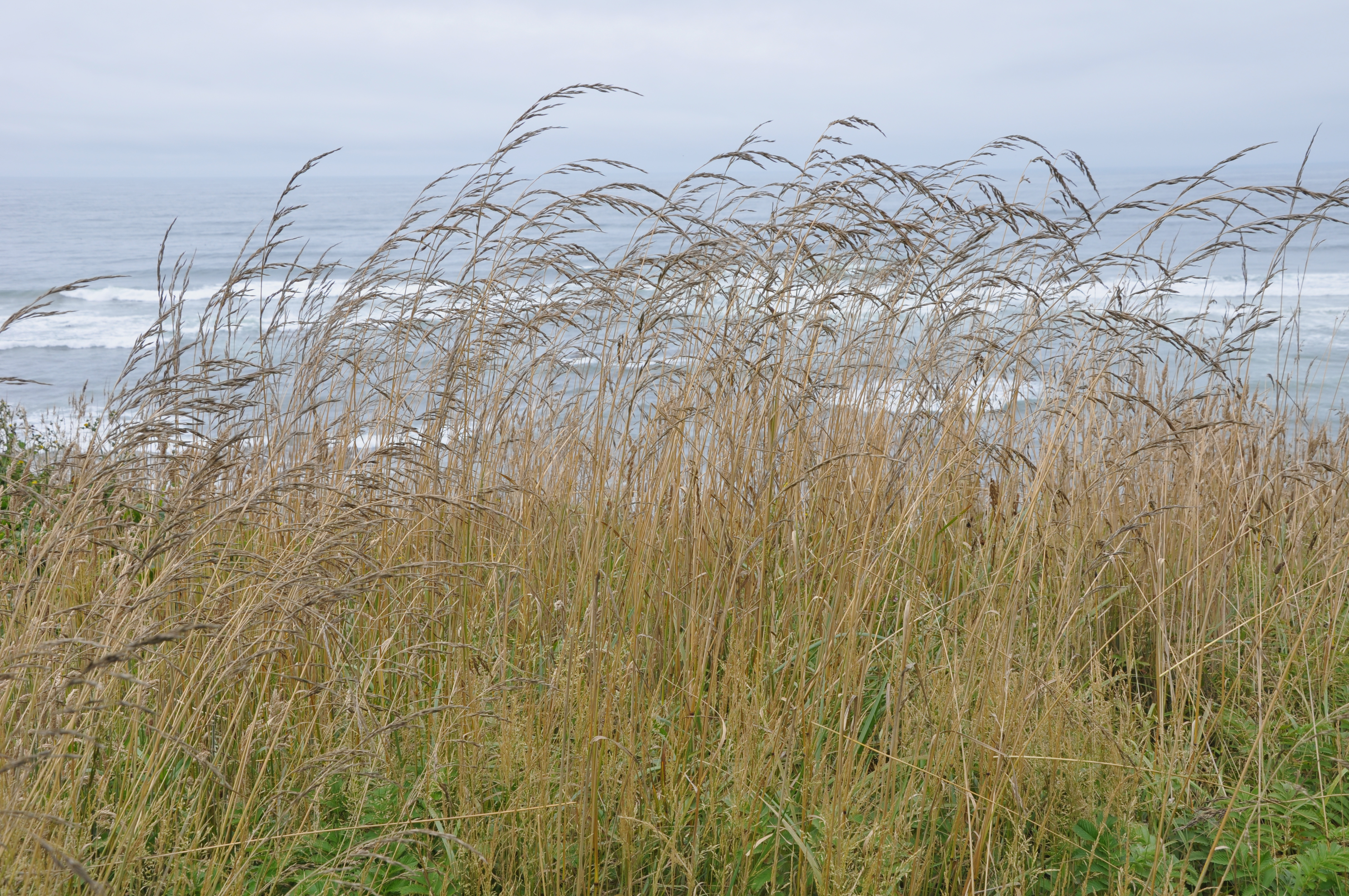
- Looking toward the ocean from the parking area

- Location within Oregon Location within the United States
- Type: Public, state
- Location: Lane County, Oregon
- Nearest city: Yachats
- Coordinates: 44°12′29″N 124°06′54″W
- Operator: Oregon Parks and Recreation Department
- Status: Open year-round

Tokatee Klootchman State Natural Site is a state park in the U.S. state of Oregon. Administered by the Oregon Parks and Recreation Department, it offers wildlife, bird, and marine-mammal watching, and it has a beach. The park is 16 miles (26 km) north of Florence on U.S. Route 101.

== See also ==
- List of Oregon state parks
