= Bonnington Range =

Mountain range in British Columbia, Canada

- Location within British Columbia

Highest point
- Coordinates: 49°14′N 117°27′W

Geography
- Country: Canada
- Province: British Columbia
- Parent range: Selkirk Mountains

The Bonnington Range is a subrange of the Selkirk Mountains of the Columbia Mountains in southeastern British Columbia, Canada, located between Salmo River and Columbia River south of Nelson.
