= John Ogilvie Davidson =

John Ogilvie "Skook" Davidson DCM, MM & two bars (July 29, 1892 - 1972) was a soldier, land surveyor, packer, guide and rancher in far northern British Columbia, Canada. Known as "Skook" or "Skookum" Davidson because of his stature (big and strong), he is the namesake of Mount Skook Davidson and the Liard River landing Skooks Landing was so-named because it was where he would arrange to have supplies dropped for his Diamond J Ranch, which lay up the Kechika River 150 miles from there. He moved to Vancouver in 1972 following a fire at the ranch. The location is near Fireside, British Columbia and near it is an old construction camp used by crews building the Alaska Highway, the route of which he helped discover.
