= Klootch Canyon =

Coordinates: 54°55′00″N 123°33′00″W

Klootch Canyon, originally Klootchman Canyon, is a canyon on the Skeena River in northwestern British Columbia, Canada, south of the community of Cedarvale.

"Klootchman" is the Chinook Jargon word for "woman" or "female" (i.e. as an adjective).

== See also ==
- List of Chinook Jargon placenames
