= Owyhee =

Owyhee or Owhyhee is an older English spelling of Hawaiʻi, used in the late 18th and early 19th centuries. It is found in the names of certain locations in the American part of the Pacific Northwest, which were explored and mapped by expeditions whose members included native Hawaiians:

- Owyhee, Idaho, an unincorporated community in Ada County
- Owyhee, Nevada, a community in north-central Nevada
- Owyhee County, Idaho, the southwesternmost county of Idaho
- Owyhee River, a river in Idaho, Nevada, and Oregon
  - Owyhee Dam, a dam on the river
- Lake Owyhee, a lake in Oregon
- Owyhee Desert, a desert in Nevada and Idaho
- Owyhee Mountains, a mountain range in Idaho and Oregon

== See also ==
- Owyhee High School, a public secondary school in Meridian, Idaho
- Owyhee Reservoir State Airport, an airport adjacent to Lake Owyhee
- USS Owyhee River (LFR-515), an amphibious assault ship of the United States Navy
