= Lolo Butte =

Summit in Oregon, United States

Coordinates: 43°51′09″N 121°36′27″W

Lolo Butte is a summit in Deschutes County, Oregon, in the United States. with an elevation of 4,835 feet (1,474 m) NGVD 29.

Lolo is a name derived from Chinook Jargon meaning pack or carry.
