= Kechika Ranges =

Mountain range in British Columbia, Canada

Coordinates: 58°45′00″N 127°30′00″W

The Kechika Ranges are a subrange of the Cassiar Mountains subdivision of the Interior Mountains in far northern British Columbia, Canada, lying west of the Rocky Mountain Trench between the Rainbow (S) and Deadwood Rivers (N).

== See also ==
- Kechika River
