= Skookumchuck Rapids Provincial Park =

Provincial park in British Columbia, Canada

- IUCN category II (national park)
- Location within British Columbia
- Interactive map of Skookumchuck Rapids Provincial Park
- Location: British Columbia, Canada
- Nearest city: Salmon Arm
- Coordinates: 50°36′45″N 118°45′12″W
- Area: 0.71 km^{2} (0.27 sq mi)
- Established: May 17, 2004
- Governing body: BC Parks

Skookumchuck Rapids Provincial Park is a provincial park in British Columbia, Canada, located on the Shuswap River just below the outlet of Mabel Lake. This park was established as a result of the Okanagan-Shuswap Land and Resource Management Plan.
