= Lolo =

Lolo can refer to:

== Places ==
=== United States ===
- Lolo, Montana, a census-designated place
- Lolo Butte, a summit in Oregon
- Lolo Pass (Idaho–Montana)
- Lolo Pass (Oregon)
- Lolo National Forest, Montana
- Lolo Peak, Montana

=== Elsewhere ===
- Lolo, Cameroon, a village in East Region, Cameroon
- Mount Lolo, near Kamloops, British Columbia, Canada
- Mount Lolo (Quadra Island), British Columbia, Canada
- Roman Catholic Diocese of Lolo, Democratic Republic of the Congo
- Lolo River, Gabon
- Lolo, Iran, a village in Khuzestan Province
- Lolo, Kerman, a village in Kerman Province, Iran

== People ==
- Lolo (given name), a list of people
- Lolo (surname), a list of people
- Lolo people, or Yi, in China
- Loló (footballer, born 1981), Angolan footballer Lourenço Tomás Cuxixima
- Lolo (footballer, born 1984), Spanish footballer Manuel Jesús Ortiz Toribio
- Lolo (footballer, born 1993), Spanish footballer Manuel Coronado Plá
- Lolo (singer), American singer-songwriter and actress Lauren Pritchard
- LØLØ, stage name of Canadian pop singer Lauren Mandel
- Karisma Kapoor (born 1974), Indian actress whose family nickname is "Lolo"

== Entertainment ==
- Lolo (film), a 2015 French comedy
- Scamper the Penguin (in the film The Adventures of Scamper the Penguin), known as "Lolo" outside the United States
- A blue ball-like character from the Eggerland series of games, most notably Adventures of Lolo, a 1989 video game.
- Lolo (Klonoa character), from the Klonoa video game series

== Other uses ==
- Lift-on/lift-off (LoLo) ships
- Lower Lower Manhattan (LoLo), a proposal for Lower Manhattan expansion
- Lolo, a donkey "painter", whose work was shown as that of fictitious Italian painter Joachim-Raphaël Boronali
- Lolo (Lo Loestrin), a brand of ethinylestradiol/norethisterone acetate
- Lolo, a subdialect of the Makhuwa language of Mozambique
- any of several Loloish languages of China and Tibet
- Lowrider, a type of car

== See also ==
- Lolo ball
- Iolo, a Welsh given name
