= Mount Tod =

Mountain in British Columbia, Canada

- Skwelkwekwelt
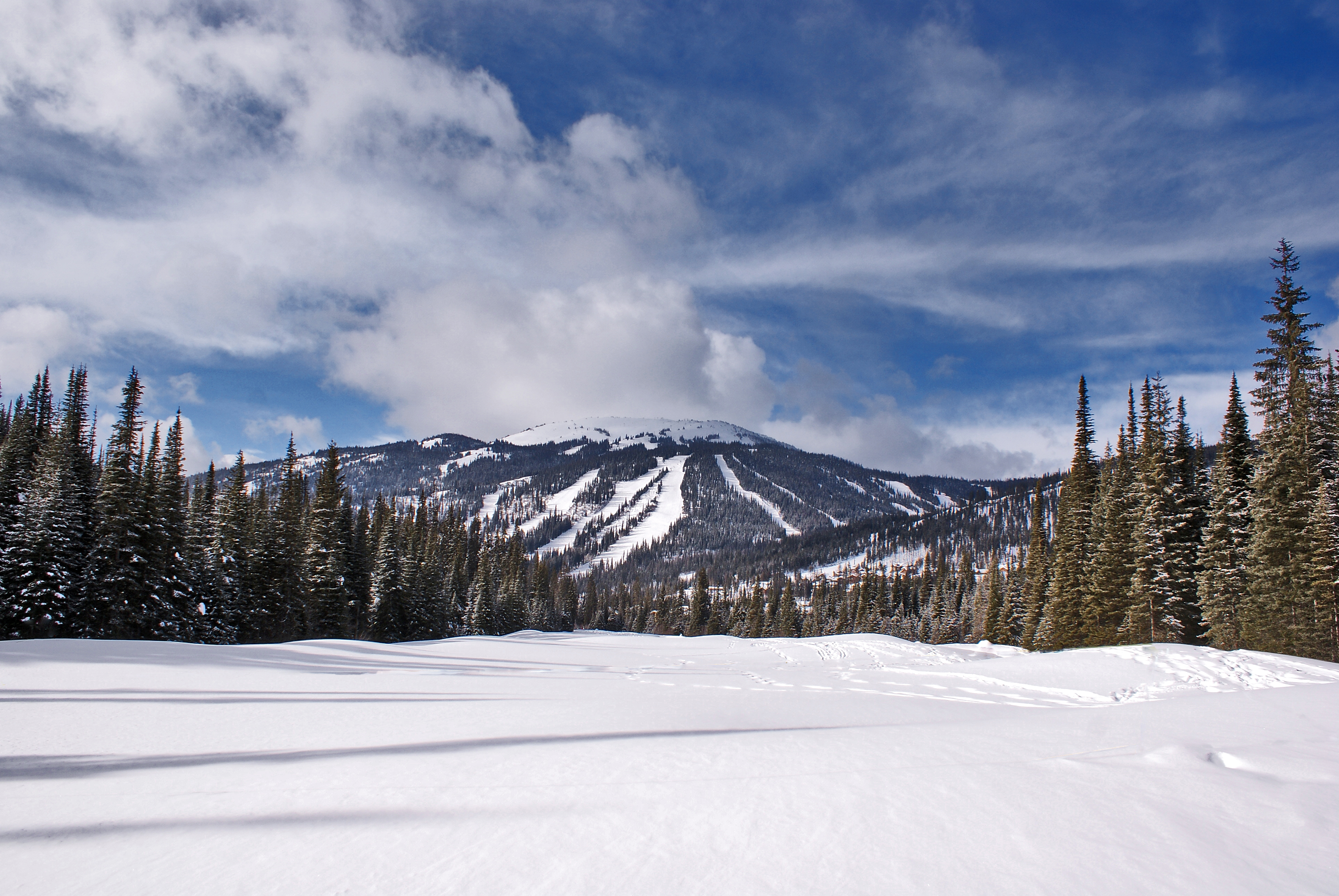
- Mount Tod, looking Northwest.

Highest point
- Elevation: 2,155 m (7,070 ft)
- Prominence: 1,523 m (4,997 ft)
- Listing: Mountains of British Columbia; Canada prominent peaks 133rd
- Coordinates: 50°55′00″N 119°56′27″W

Naming
- Native name: Skwelkwekwelt (Shuswap)

Geography
- Location within British Columbia
- Interactive map of Mount Tod
- Location: British Columbia, Canada
- District: Kamloops Division Yale Land District
- Parent range: Monashee Mountains; Columbia Mountains
- Topo map: NTS 82L13 Chase

Mount Tod (Secwemptsin: Skwelkwekwelt), commonly known as Tod Mountain, is a summit 50 km northeast of Kamloops, British Columbia, Canada. Located northeast of the junction of Louis and McGillivray Creeks, it is part of the upland area between the Interior Plateau (W) and the Monashee Mountains (E) known as the Shuswap Highland, the mountain is the highest of three summits comprising the Sun Peaks alpine ski resort.

== Name origin ==
The mountain is named for John Tod, one of the most prominent of the fur traders assigned to the New Caledonia fur district. He first joined the Hudson's Bay Company in 1813. He was in charge of Fort McLeod from 1823 to 1832, and in charge of Fort Kamloops (1841–43). His retirement home in Victoria, on which he began construction in 1850, is the oldest inhabited house in British Columbia.

Also named for him is Tod Inlet, a sidewater of Saanich Inlet and formerly the name of a post office at that location, to the southwest of Brentwood Bay, and also Tod Creek, which flows into it, and Tod Rock, which is offshore.

Mount Lolo, which is nearer to Kamloops than Mount Tod, is named for his right-hand man and interpreter, Jean Baptiste Lolo a.k.a. Chief Lolo, as is Paul Lake ("St. Paul" or "Chief Paul" were other names for Chief Lolo).

== Traditional land use ==
Skwelkwekwelt was known as a place where moose and deer meat was dried to last through the winter. As of 2012, a Shuswap website notes, "Many roots and medicines were harvested by the people at Skwelkwekwelt. This traditional use area is being destroyed by major expansion to the Sun Peaks Ski resort and by logging."

== See also ==
- Tod (disambiguation)
