= Lolo (given name) =

Lolo is a unisex given name. People named Lolo include:

- Lolo Arziki (born 1992), Cape Verdean filmmaker and activist
- Lolo Fakaosilea (born 1995), Australian rugby union player
- Lolo Lui (born 1982), Samoan rugby player
- Lolo Letalu Matalasi Moliga, American Samoan politician, former educator, and businessman
- Lolo Soetoro (1935–1987), stepfather of Barack Obama
- Lolo Waka (born 1986), South African rugby union footballer
- Lolo Letalu Matalasi, known as Lolo Matalasi Moliga (born 1947), American Samoan politician
- Lolo Cecilia Ezeilo, Nigerian politician, lawyer, philanthropist and television presenter

== Mononym ==
- Lolo (singer), (stylized as LOLO), stagename of Lauren Pritchard (born 1987), American singer, songwriter and actress
- Loló (footballer, born 1981), nickname of Lourenço Tomás Cuxixima (born 1981), Angolan footballer
- Lolo (footballer, born 1984), nickname of Manuel Jesús Ortiz Toribio (born 1984), Spanish footballer
- Lolo (footballer, born 1993), nickname of Manuel Coronado Pla (born 1993), Spanish footballer

== As a nickname ==
- Lolo Escobar, nickname of Manuel María Escobar Rodríguez (born 1976), Spanish football manager and player
- Lolo Ferrari, nickname of Ève Valois (1963–2000), French model and actress
- Lolo, nickname of Manuel Lozano Garrido (1920–1971), Spanish journalist and author
- Lolo González, nickname of Emmanuel González Rodríguez (born 1991), Spanish professional footballer
- Lolo Ibern, nickname of Manuel Ibern Alcalde (born 1946), Spanish water polo player
- Lolo, nickname of Karisma Kapoor (born 1974), Bollywood actress
- Lolo Jones, nickname of Lori Susan Jones (born 1982), American hurdler and bobsledder
- Lolo Rico, nickname of María Dolores Rico Oliver (1935–2019), Spanish writer, television producer, screenwriter and journalist
- Lolo Sainz, nickname of Manuel Sainz Márquez (born 1940), Spanish former basketball player and coach
- Lolo, nickname of Lauren Silver (born 1987), American water polo player
- Loló Soldevilla, nickname of Dolores Soldevilla Nieto (1901–1971), Cuban visual artist
- Lolo Villalobos, nickname of Jose D. Villalobos y Olivera (1913–1997), Cuban politician
- Lolo Zouaï, nickname of Laureen Rebeha Zouaï (born 1995), French-American musician

== See also ==
- Lolo (disambiguation)
- LØLØ
- Lo' Lo' Mohd Ghazali
