= Big Timothy Mountain =

Mountain in British Columbia, Canada

- Location within British Columbia
- Interactive map of Big Timothy Mountain

Highest point
- Elevation: 2,160 m (7,090 ft)
- Prominence: 1,085 m (3,560 ft)
- Coordinates: 52°06′08″N 120°55′52″W

Geography
- Location: British Columbia, Canada
- District: Cariboo Land District
- Topo map: NTS 93A2 McKinley Creek

Big Timothy Mountain, formerly called Boss Mountain and Takomkane Mountain, is a mountain in central British Columbia, Canada, located 9 km (6 mi) west of Hendrix Lake and 39 km (24 mi) southwest of Mount Perseus.

Big Timothy Mountain is notable for having xenoliths made of peridotite from the Earth's mantle. Other mantle material at the mountain are augite xenocrysts, and granodiorite xenoliths. The xenoliths were emplaced by the Takomkane Batholith.
