= Mount Lolo =

Mountain in the country of Canada

Coordinates: 50°48′01″N 120°07′06″W

Mount Lolo (Étsxem in the Shuswap language), 1748m (5735'), prominence 818m, is a summit 20 km northeast of Kamloops, British Columbia, Canada, between Paul and Heffley Lakes. The summit is part of a small portion of the Interior Plateau which lies within the angle of the confluence of the South and North Thompson Rivers, to the east of which is an upland area known as the Shuswap Highland.

This was the site of a Pine Tree Line early warning radar station from 1957 to 1988. Manned by the Royal Air Force Engineers and connected to Norad in Cheyenne Mountain, it stood guard against the Ruskies.

== Name origin ==
Mount Lolo is named for Jean Baptiste Lolo, also known as Chief Lolo or Chief St. Paul, an Iroquois-French Canadian Métis who served in the employ of the Hudson's Bay Company as an interpreter and right-hand man to Chief Trader John Tod at Fort Fraser and Fort Kamloops. He became regarded as a chief by the local Secwepemc people.

Mount Lolo is the former site of CFS Kamloops, land which was returned to the Tkʼemlúps te Secwépemc people in 2012.

== See also ==
- Harper Mountain
- Mount Tod
- Sun Peaks
- Paul Lake Provincial Park
