= Whiting Peak (British Columbia) =

Mountain in British Columbia, Canada

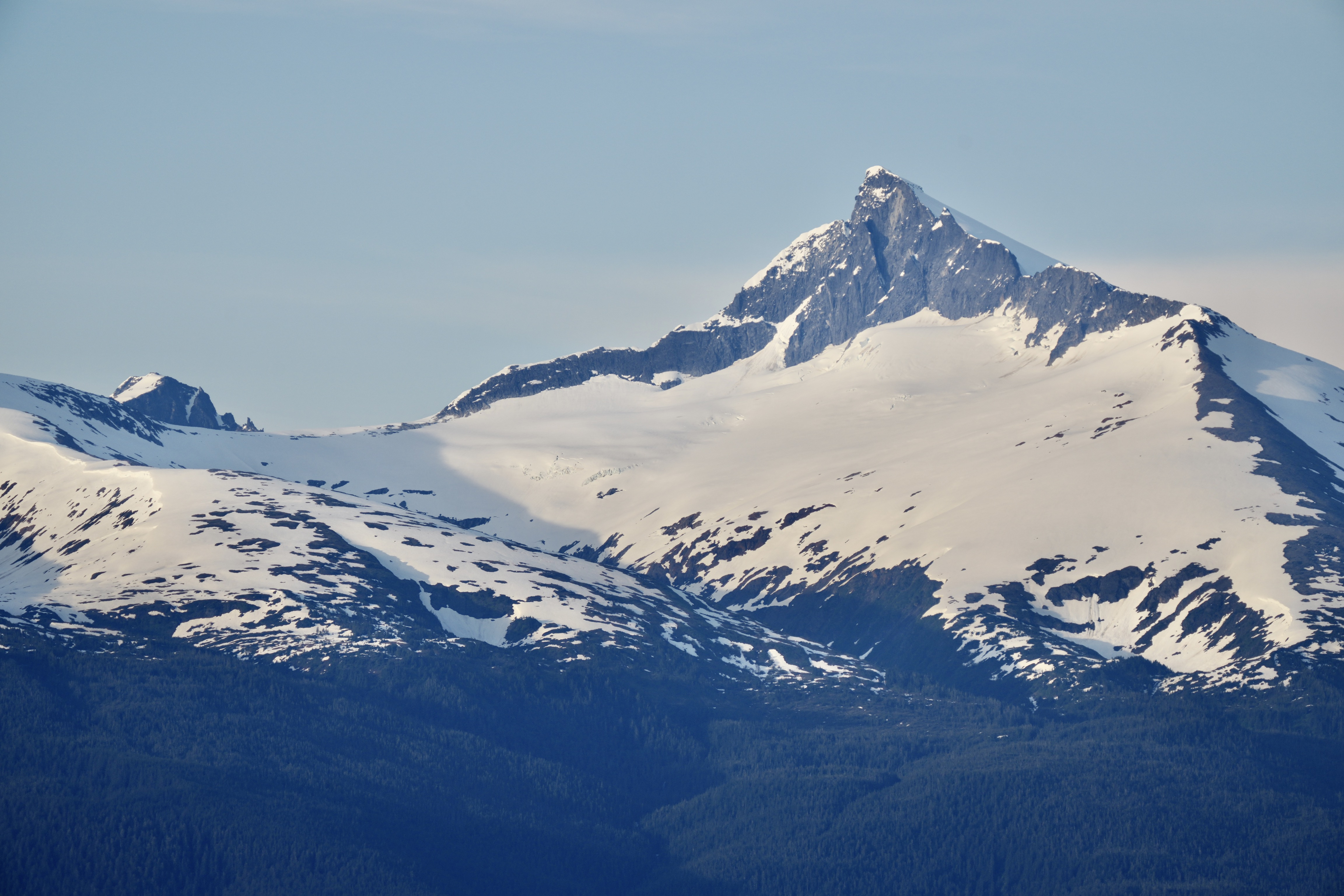
- Whiting Peak (British Columbia) June 2022

Highest point
- Elevation: 2,524 m (8,281 ft)
- Prominence: 1,669 m (5,476 ft)
- Listing: Mountains of British Columbia; Canada prominent peaks 84th
- Coordinates: 58°08′20″N 132°56′05″W

Geography
- Location within British Columbia
- Location: British Columbia, Canada
- Parent range: Boundary Ranges
- Topo map: NTS 104K2 South Whiting River

Whiting Peak is an unofficial name for a mountain in British Columbia, Canada. It has an elevation of 2,524 metres (8,281 ft) above sea level and is one of Canada's many ultra prominent peaks.

The name "Whiting Peak" is derived from it being the high point of a group of mountains bordered by two bodies of water. Whiting Lake lies to the east and the Whiting River runs to the west of this group.

== Gallery ==
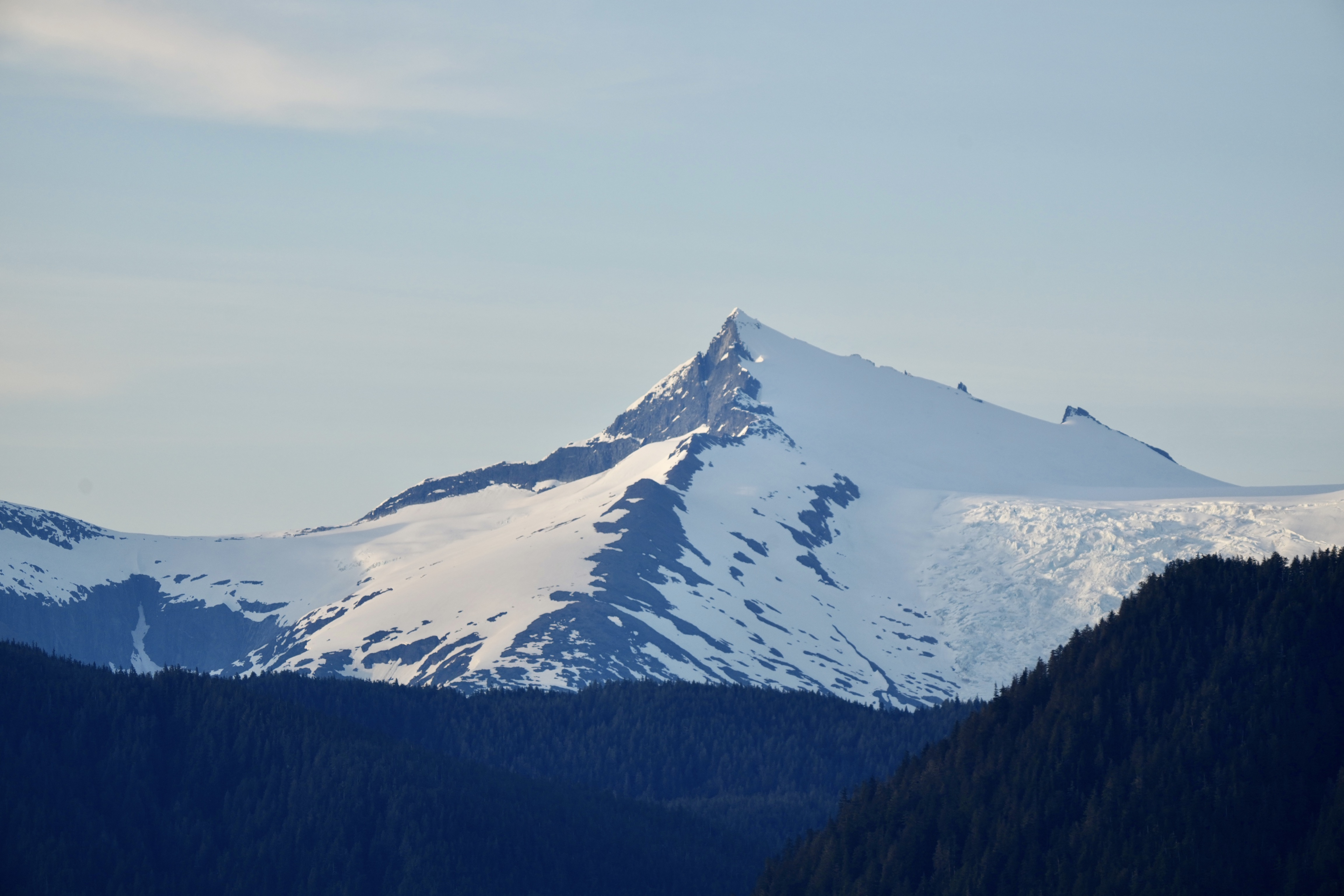
Whiting Peak (British Columbia) on June 24, 2022

== See also ==
- Geography of British Columbia
