= Ambition Mountain =

Mountain in British Columbia, Canada

- Location within British Columbia
- Interactive map of Ambition Mountain

Highest point
- Elevation: 2,953 m (9,688 ft)
- Prominence: 1,503 m (4,931 ft)
- Parent peak: Scud Peak (2987 m)
- Listing: Mountains of British Columbia; Most prominent in Canada 137th
- Coordinates: 57°23′42″N 131°29′07″W

Geography
- Country: Canada
- Province: British Columbia
- District: Cassiar Land District
- Topo map: NTS 92F13 Upper Campbell Lake

Ambition Mountain is a mountain in British Columbia, Canada, located 17 km (11 mi) east of the Stikine River and 26 km (16 mi) northwest of Scud Peak. The mountain was originally named Mount Ambition on a 1935 Canadian Geological Survey map but was changed to Ambition Mountain on 6 May 1954, as it was the long-standing local name used by riverboat navigators and prospectors.
