= Lolo (surname) =

The surname Lolo may refer to:

- Cecil Lolo (1988-2015), South African footballer
- Fatima Lolo (1891–1997), Nigerian singer
- Igor Lolo (born 1982), Ivorian former football player
- Jean Baptiste Lolo (1798-?), Hudson's Bay Company employee and interpreter in what is now Canada
- Patrick Lolo (born 1980), Congolese footballer
