= Angna Mountain =

Mountain in Nunavut, Canada

- Location within Nunavut

Highest point
- Elevation: 1,710 m (5,610 ft)
- Prominence: 1,510 m (4,950 ft)
- Listing: Canada prominent peaks 137th
- Coordinates: 66°33′27″N 62°01′15″W

Geography
- Location: Baffin Island, Nunavut, Canada
- Parent range: Baffin Mountains
- Topo map: NTS 16L9 Inuk Mountain

Angna Mountain is a mountain located on Baffin Island, Nunavut, Canada. It is associated with the Baffin Mountains which in turn form part of the Arctic Cordillera mountain system.
