= Sun Peaks Resort =

Ski resort in British Columbia, Canada

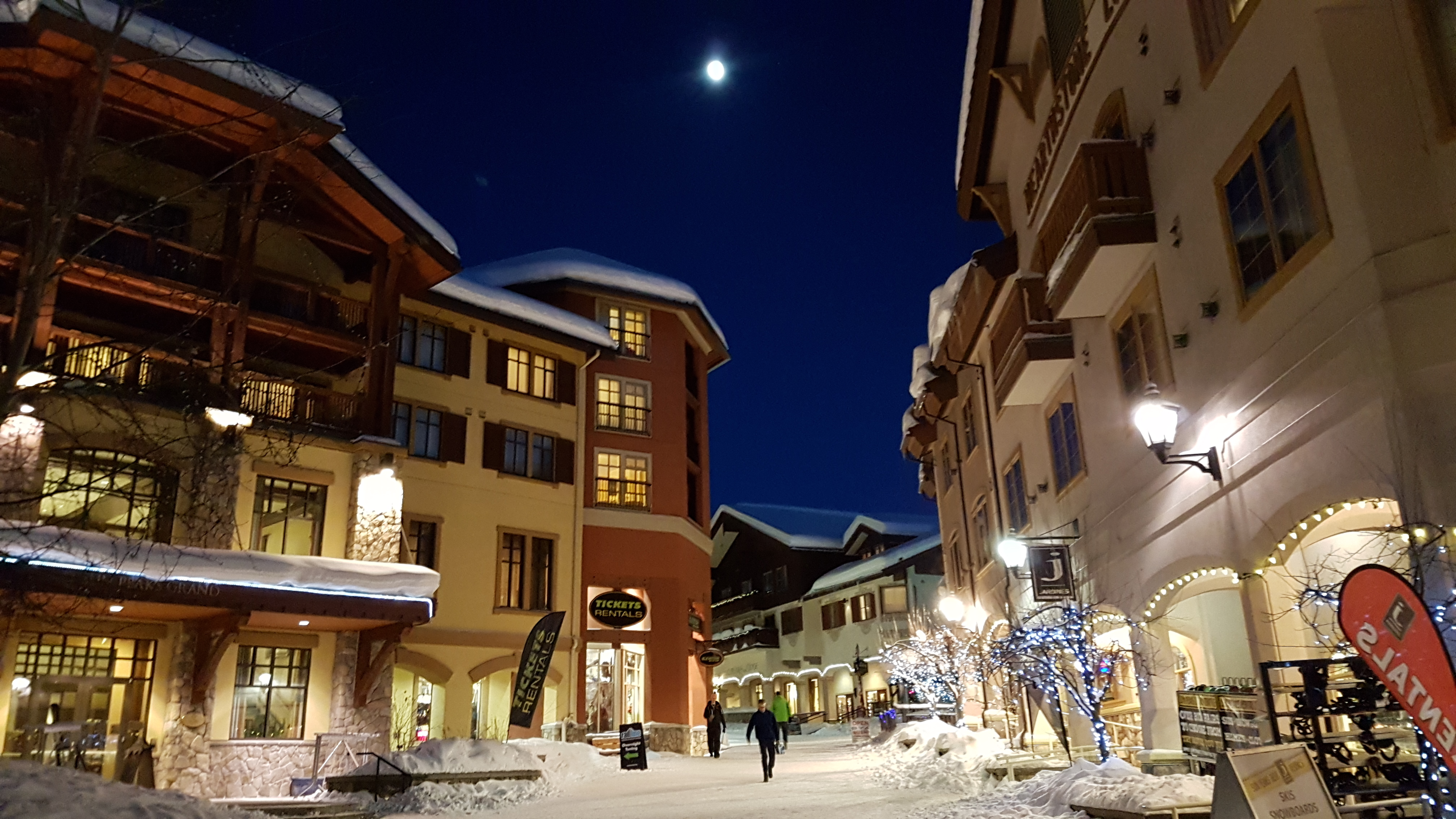

- Location within British Columbia Location within Canada
- Location: British Columbia, Canada
- Nearest city: Kamloops, 56 km (35 mi)
- Coordinates: 50°53′38″N 119°53′35″W
- Vertical: 882 m (2,894 ft)
- Top elevation: 2,152 m (7,060 ft)
- Base elevation: 1,198 m (3,930 ft)
- Skiable area: 4,270 acres (1,730 ha)
- Trails: 144 including 17 gladed areas 10% beginner 58% intermediate 32% expert
- Longest run: 8 km (5.0 mi)
- Lift system: 13 total 3 detachable quads 4 quads 6 surface lifts
- Lift capacity: 15,800 riders per hour
- Snowfall: 559 cm (220 in)
- Website: sunpeaksresort.com

Sun Peaks Resort is a ski resort located in Sun Peaks, British Columbia, Canada, 56.6 km (35.2 mi) northeast of Kamloops.

The summit of the ski area is at an elevation of 2,080 m (6,820 ft), with an 882 m (2,894 ft) vertical rise from the base of the peak. The resort has 16 square kilometres (6.2 sq mi) of skiable terrain (second largest in Canada), and receives an average of 5.6 m (18 ft) of snow per year. Sun Peaks area averages over 2000 hours of sun a year.

The ski area comprises three mountains and another smaller mountain: Tod Mountain, Sundance Mountain, Mt. Morrisey, and Orient.

== History ==
=== The founding of Tod Mountain Resort ===
In 1958, while commuting back to Kamloops from a day of skiing at the SilverStar ski resort in Vernon, Donald Whyte and Donald Munro spotted Tod Mountain from a rise on Highway 97 near where it meets Barnhartvale Road. On 9 May 1959, both paid a visit to the village of Whitecroft, at the base of Tod Mountain. On 16 May, Munro, Whyte, lawyer Reginald Humphreys, ski resort operator Sam Warmington, and doctor James Osborne once again drove to Whitecroft. A nearby ranch owner rented the men horses and led them up the towering peak. An hour and a half after setting off, the party reached what is now known as the West Bowl, on the northwestern side of Tod Mountain. The group spent two nights in a shepherd's cabin. Once they set out again, they trekked to the crest of Tod Mountain, now known as the Top of the World (the location of the current Burfield and Crystal chairlift top terminals). Ahead of them lay the Crystal Bowl, pristine and bearing ideal geological features for a chairlift and ski resort.

In May 1959, Tod Mountain Ski Resort and Tod Mountain Ski Village were incorporated. Through the summer of 1960, the small range road between Heffley Creek on Highway 5 and Whitecroft was improved to two lanes, and a new road was constructed from the Whitecroft valley up to the foot of Tod Mountain. In early 1961, construction commenced on the original Burfield (at the time called Tod Mountain Ski Lift) chairlift. Constructed in Vancouver by Murray-Latta, surveying and design was carried out by McLellan and Company, and Bregoliss Construction, based in Kamloops, was awarded the contract for clearing of the runs and lift line, construction of the top, midstation, and bottom terminals, and the erecting of the lift poles. Donald Munro was appointed President of the two resort companies.

In November 1961, Tod Mountain ski resort opened. The original chairlift was a double-person capacity, 9,300-foot (2,800 m) diesel powered system with a capacity of 400 people/hour. At the time, it was the longest chairlift in North America. Five runs had been cut: Crystal Bowl, Ridge, 5 Mile, Chief, and the latter half of what is now known as 7 Mile Road.

=== Closure of the resort 1968–1970 ===
In July 1968, seven years after the opening day, a crew was conducting maintenance work on the top terminal of the Tod Mountain Ski Lift, when a spark from a welding job flew into the sump pump, causing the wooden building housing the machinery to alight. The fire ignited the diesel drive which was directly linked to the bullwheel, causing the entire lift line to part from the wheel, dropping to the ground. Although the weight of the chairs dragging and colliding with the ground and obstacles arrested the motion of the rampant lift cable somewhat, significant damage was inflicted upon the lift. Repairs and insurance matters prevented the re-opening of the resort until the 1970–1971 ski season.

=== Acquisition by Highland Development ===
In December 1969, Highland Development, owned by Drake Cummings, purchased all shares of both resort companies. The company took responsibility for Tod Mountain Resort's expenses.

=== Death of Harry Burfield ===
On 12 June 1971, Harry Burfield was killed in a plane crash on Tod Mountain. Burfield was a prominent ski racer and a pioneer of the ski area; he constructed the Tod Mountain (now Burfield) lodge at what is now the base of the Burfield Chair; the lodge still stands. The Cessna 180 aircraft Burfield and three others were flying in was performing a sightseeing journey for the benefit of prospective investors for the resort. In the crash, all onboard died. "Harry's Run", a run stemming off the present day West Bowl network, is cut near the crash site. In his honor, the lodge he previously operated and the Tod Mountain chairlift were renamed to the Burfield Lodge and the Burfield Chair, respectively.

=== Construction of the Shuswap Chairlift and expansion east ===
In 1972, the Shuswap Chairlift was installed. It was a two-person chair, in operation for the 1972–1973 ski season. The development of this chair, near the current base of the Sunburst Express, marked the start of the eastwards push for the resort, which eventually resulted in the modern-day facilities currently in operation (the village and main chairlift center).

=== Divestment of Highland Developments and financial struggles ===
In 1972, Highland Developments disassociated from the Tod Mountain group, and Petric Recreation, and Klapstock Holdings formed Tod Mountain Recreation and the two companies apportioned equal shares. Peter Pocklington, the then-owner of the Edmonton Oilers hockey team, purchased Klapstock Holdings' shares in 1974, and a small percentage of his total cash was allocated to Tod Mountain. Pocklington's prominent standing among the bureaucracy, the Royal Bank of Canada loaned him and Petric Recreation money, which enabled Tod Mountain to maintain their status until the 1976–1977 season. After that, the financial weak company, and a winter with little snowfall, led the Royal Bank to cancel the loans. In December 1976, Tod Mountain ski resort entered a voluntary receivership status. In mid-1978 Tod Mountain was disposed of by the Royal Bank. The highest bidder, a private group of businessmen based in Calgary, bought the resort and its holdings on in October 1978. The resort was renamed Tod Mountain Developments.

=== Reconciliation and revamping of facilities ===
In 1979, the Crystal Chairlift was installed east of the Burfield, a three-person fixed-grip lift in operation for the 1979–1980 ski season.

From 1980 to 1984, Tod Mountain was a location on the Pacific Western Airlines Pro Ski Tour. At the same time, Masters races, sanctioned by the Canadian Masters National Alpine program, began to be held at Tod Mountain in 1986. In the mid-1980s, the Headwalls run became the chosen course for the annual Velocity Challenge. In this event, skiers "tuck" into a special, aerodynamic position and ski down the daunting, black-diamond difficulty Headwalls Run. Speeds of up to 175 km/h (109 mph) are reached. The last time the event was held was in 2018. These three main events which commenced in the 1980s not only helped to keep the resort afloat, but also boosted the reputation of Tod Mountain.

Throughout the 1980s, a noticeable shift in main operations had been transpiring. The base of the Shuswap Chair, the proposed site of the eventual village, was quickly becoming the "place to be". After the road was extended past the base of the Burfield chair to the base of the Shuswap in 1982, the "restaurant" quickly gained popularity as a food supplier. A rental shop and the relocated ski school also formed up near the chairlift. 5 Mile (then referred to as Dynamite), the run from the top of the Burfield/Crystal chairs to the base of the Shuswap Chair, gained popularity. Between 1986 and 1989, almost 10 entirely new runs, branching from the top of the Shuswap Chair, were cut and another 20 were flagged as future development.

On 24 December 1989, a fire broke out in the engine room of the Crystal Chairlift. Fred Ahrweiler, the head of Mechanical Engineering and head lift operator, received the news the next day. However, by February 1990, the Crystal Chair was running once more thanks to the tireless work of Ahrweiler and his team.

=== New Ownership through Nippon Cable and expansions ===
However, by the end of the 1989–90 season, Tod Mountain Developments Ltd. was up for sale once more. Nippon Cable of Japan, partnered with Ecosign Co., purchased the resort in April 1992. In late 1992, the new owners held a renaming contest for the resort, using ballot boxes, as "Tod" in German translated to "Death". Over 2000 ballots were deposited. On 13 August 1993, the new name was announced: Sun Peaks Resort. In the summer of 1993, Doppelmayr constructed two new chairlifts. On Tod Mountain, the Shuswap double was retired and replaced by a bubble high speed quad, named the Sunburst Express. On Sundance Ridge, a new fixed grip quad was constructed to serve a new pod of intermediate terrain. During this time, the Exhibition T-Bar was transplanted to West Bowl, opening access to a diversity of new terrain. In 1994, the Tod Mountain Road was paved over its entire 33 km (21 mi) span, increasing the safety of the journey and cutting travel times from about 45 minutes to 25–30. In 1995, the Sundance fixed grip quad was extended uphill by 2,600 feet and converted to a high speed quad. That same year, the village platter and Magic Carpet lifts were installed. In the summer of 1997, the old Burfield double chair was replaced by a Doppelmayr fixed grip quad, using the old top terminal of the Sundance quad as the bottom terminal for the new chair. Planning for a massive alpine village was started.

Many beginner facilities were constructed in an attempt to promote the mountain as a "family resort for all ages". Terrain was expanded enormously with the transplanting of the Exhibition T-Bar to the West Bowl and, primarily, an expansion onto Mount Morrisey in 2002, when a Doppelmayr CTEC high-speed quad was installed adjacent from Sundance Mountain, yielding many new runs and opportunities for future expansion, both residential and ski-wise. In 1999, the first trails for a massive network of summer bike paths were cut. Currently, the Sun Peaks bike park, serviced by the Sunburst Chair (half-converted to bike carrier chairs in the summer), boasts nearly 2,500 feet of vertical terrain, as well as ample beginner facilities, serviced by the Magic Carpet lift in the Village. Terrain varies from machined flowing cross-country trails to complete downhill singletracks. Sun Peaks Bike Park is a permanent fixture on the BC Downhill Cup Series and has hosted the BC Downhill Championships and the Canadian National DH Championships in the past. Since the late 1990s, Sun Peaks Resort has worked to extend a massive web of Nordic/Cross-Country ski trails. Today, the extensive paths stretch nearly 37km (23mi) around the resort, primarily Mount Morrisey. This is in addition to a luxurious 18-hole golf course (completed in 2005), a massive residential/guest oriented ski-in village, and many more amenities built under the guiding eye of Nippon Cable.

In 2006, the Elevation fixed grip quad was constructed on Tod Mountain, running from a point midway down 5-Mile to an unload location adjacent to Sunburst Lodge. This and further run-cutting opened up a brand-new race center. The Austrian National Ski Team signed a five-year contract in 2005 to train at Sun Peaks in preparation for the 2010 Winter Olympics in Vancouver.

=== Secwepemc Resistance ===
After the purchase of Sun Peaks by Nippon Cable in 1992, the NDP provincial government adopted a long-term development contract with Nippon without addressing Secwepemc Title Claims or obtaining Secwepemc consent. Nippon then initiated a 70 million dollar expansion plan that would clear-cut three more mountains (at the time Sun Peaks only encompassed two mountains), double the golf course, expand a drainage basin for commercial and residential real estate, and add over 24,000 more beds to the resort. In 1998 the Neskonlith Secwepemc people appealed to Masayoshi Ohkubo, then President of Sun Peaks Corporation, to respect their title and rights. They also appealed to the Federal Minister of Indian and Northern Affairs, Rover D. Nault, who claimed that the land dispute with Sun Peaks fell under provincial jurisdiction.

Asserting that the Sun Peaks Resort undermined their ability to exercise their inherent rights to land-use and occupancy and constituted a violation of Aboriginal title, Secwepemc land defenders launched a years-long campaign to oppose Sun Peaks expansion in 1999. The campaign opposed Sun Peaks expansion, the 2010 Winter Olympics, and called for boycotts of both Sun Peaks Resort and Delta Hotels. Secwepemc land defenders argued that clearcut logging on three mountains to expand the resort ruined the habitats of deer, moose, bears, beavers, lynx, bobcat, cougars and wolverines; that traditional foods and medicines the Secwepemc have relied on no longer grew in the area; and that lakes and rivers had been polluted by chemicals used to make artificial snow and maintain golf courses.

In 2000, land defenders established the first Skwelkwek'welt Protection Centre. In 2001, RCMP arrested a number of land defenders at the Secwepemc MacGillivray Lake village while enforcing a trespass order, including youth. Skwelkwek'welt Protection Centre spokesperson Janice Billy alleged that officers used excessive force on land defenders, including choking a youth, using pepper spray on youth, and injuring the arm of a young woman. In 2004, Indigenous leader George Manuel Jr. was arrested along with two others by the RCMP, who were enforcing a court injunction ordering Indigenous activists and supporters to leave the area. The arrests were condemned by the Council of Canadians and Union of BC Indian Chiefs. Between 1999 and 2005, 54 Skewelkwek'welt land defenders were arrested. In addition to arrests, a traditional cedar bark lodge and cabin were burned down in 2001 and racist youth gangs incited violence against Indigenous youth in Chase in 2001.

In 2001 Neskonlith Indian Band Chief Arthur Manuel held negotiations with the province through BC Attorney General Geoff Plant, which Manuel explained as failing due to Plant insisting that the Skwelkwek'welt Protection Centre at Sun Peaks and land defence camp at McGillivray Lake be dismantled.

In 2006, the land defenders' focus turned to the 2010 Winter Olympics and the Secwepemc Native Youth Movement launched an anti-Olympics campaign during the Canadian Masters Alpine Championships at Sun Peaks, calling for a boycott of Sun Peaks Resort and Delta Hotels. While Sun Peaks claimed to have no direct involvement in the upcoming Olympics, the youth campaign opposed the training of the Austrian Olympic ski team at the resort and protested Nancy Greene Raine's involvement in the resort. At the time Greene Raine's company, NGR Resort Consultants, was being protested by St'at'imc land defenders over the proposed Cayoosh Resort in the Cayoosh Mountain Range. The Secwepemc Native Youth Movement also protested the installation of Nancy Greene Raine as first chancellor of Thompson Rivers University in Kamloops.

Federal and provincial governments refused to acknowledge Secwepemc title in cases relating to the protests, which land defenders pointed out violated the Supreme Court of Canada's recognition of Aboriginal Title in the 1997 Delgamuukw Decision. In 2004, the British Columbia Supreme Court rejected the appeal of eight Secwepemc activists convicted of public mischief and intimidation, ruling that they did not possess a legal and traditional right to defend their territory despite never having relinquished the territory to either the provincial or federal governments by land claim or treaty.

The anti-Sun Peaks campaign garnered national support, including from the Assembly of First Nations, KAIROS: Canadian Ecumenical Justice Initiative and Naomi Klein. In 2003, the Special Rapporteur of the United Nations High Commissioner for Human Rights visited the Skwelkwek'welt Protection Centre. Additionally, there were solidarity protests held in Germany.

=== Recent expansions ===
In 2014, the previously out-of-bounds area known as Gil's was added to the in-bounds area of the resort, making Sun Peaks the second largest ski resort in Canada.

On 23 December 2018, a new fixed grip quad was added in the East Village area. The Orient lift starts across from the base of Morrisey Express, and runs to a point just uphill of the East Village Ski Way, and improved ski-back access from the Mount Morrisey side of the resort while also providing ski-in-ski-out access for hundreds of homes in the East Village, as well as opening up large possibilities for future expansion.

For the 2020-2021 season, the 41-year-old Crystal triple was replaced by a fixed grip quad. The Crystal quad boasts a 20% uphill capacity increase and follows a different alignment that ends adjacent to where Burfield unloads, eliminating the need to ride Burfield to access Top of the World and the West Bowl area. The Crystal chairlift was installed with a loading conveyor belt in 2021, and the Elevation chairlift was installed with a similar system in 2024.

After being "temporarily" disused for the 2020–21 season, the West Bowl T-Bar's official retirement was announced prior to the beginning of the 2021–22 ski season. In early 2022, Sun Peaks Resort started the application process for a high speed quad in the West Bowl. Over the summer of 2022, the entire lift line was cut, the bases for the bottom and top terminals were built, and substantial logging and run cutting went on below the current West Bowl skiing area. In addition, a new road was built from the future top terminal site to connect to 5 Mile and the rest of the mountain. Construction on the West Bowl Express took place primarily over the summers of 2023 and 2024, and the 1.58 km (1 mi) chairlift opened for the 2024-25 ski season.

The Burfield chair is the longest fixed grip chairlift in North America, and is the 9th longest in travel length (9,510 ft (2,900 m).

Nancy Greene Raine is the Director of Skiing at the resort.

== Ski lifts ==
Sun Peaks has an all-Doppelmayr fleet of nine ski lifts, including two Doppelmayr CTEC lifts on all three mountains, Tod, Sundance and Morrisey. Sun Peaks also has 3 magic carpets.

Name	Type	Builder	Built	Vertical metres (feet)	Length metres (feet)	Mountain
Sunburst Express	High Speed Quad	Doppelmayr	1993	596 (1954)	2378 (7802)	Tod
Sundance Express	High Speed Quad	Doppelmayr	1995	477 (1564)	2041 (6696)	Sundance
West Bowl Express	High Speed Quad	Doppelmayr	2024	312 (1023)	1563 (5128)	Tod
Morrisey Express	High Speed Quad	Doppelmayr CTEC	2002	394 (1292)	1741 (5713)	Morrisey
Elevation	Quad	Doppelmayr CTEC	2006	312 (1024)	1117 (3665)	Tod
Burfield	Quad	Doppelmayr	1997	881 (2892)	2899 (9510)	Tod
Orient	Quad	Doppelmayr	2018	251 (822)	1048 (3438)	Sundance and Orient Ridge
Crystal	Quad	Doppelmayr	2020	316 (1038)	951 (3119)	Tod
Village Platter	Platter	Doppelmayr	1993	52 (172)	462 (1157)	Sundance
Morrissey Platter	Platter	Doppelmayr	2001	95 (311)	876 (2874)	Morrissey

== Other facilities ==
=== Sun Peaks Mountain Bike Park ===
In addition to skiing, Sun Peaks also operates a downhill mountain bike park with over 2,000 vertical feet of terrain. The Sunburst Express quad chair takes riders to a trail park at the top.

=== Golf course ===
Sun Peaks has a 6,400 yard, 18-hole golf course. It is the highest elevation course in British Columbia, at over 1,200 m (3,900 ft) above sea level.

=== Tubing ===
In 2003 Sun Peaks opened "Tube Time" to allow for recreational tubing at the resort.

=== Banked slalom ===
In 2016, a new permanent banked slalom course was opened alongside the Sundowner and Suncatcher runs.

== Gallery ==
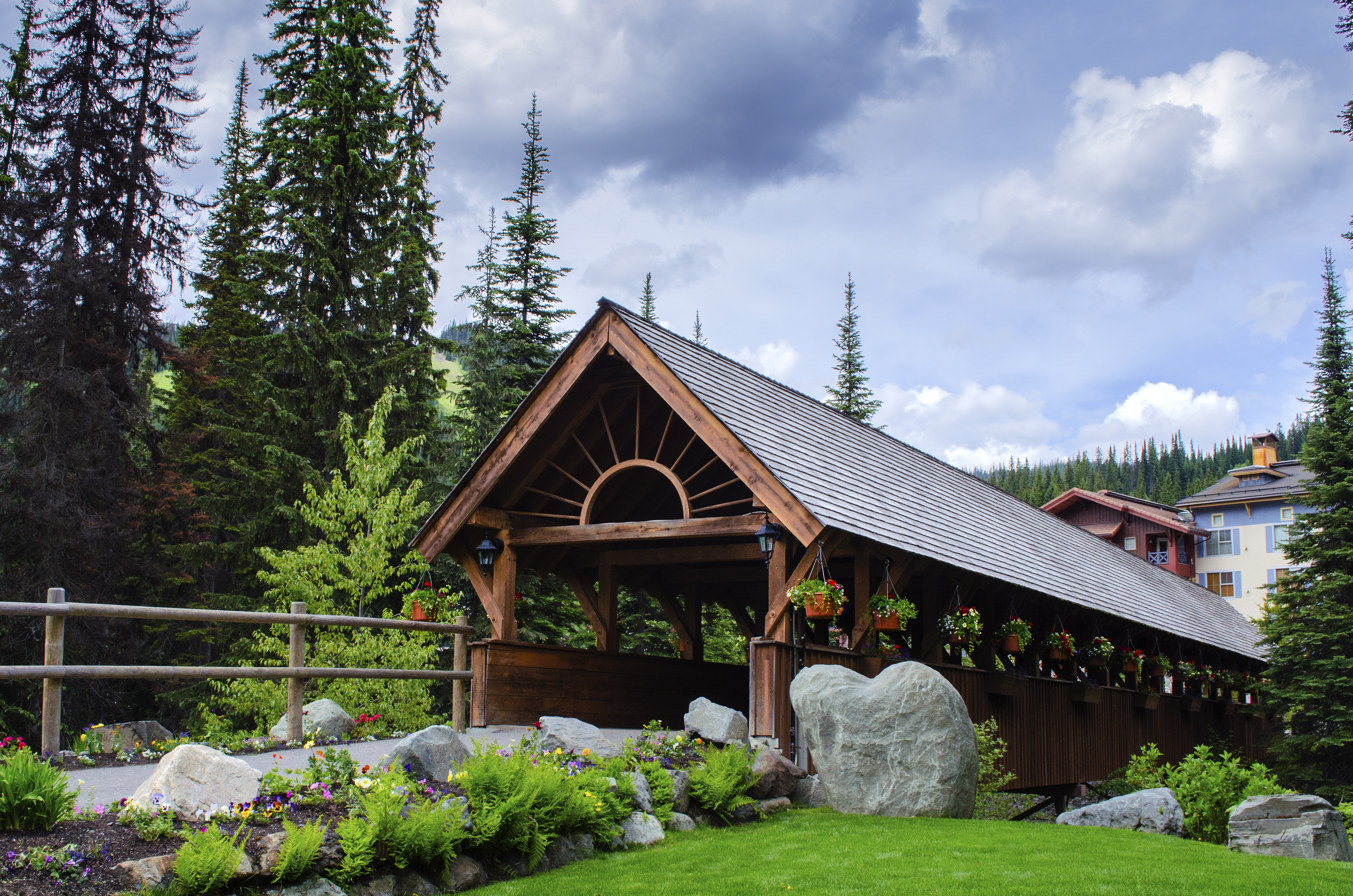
Covered bridge in Sun Peaks

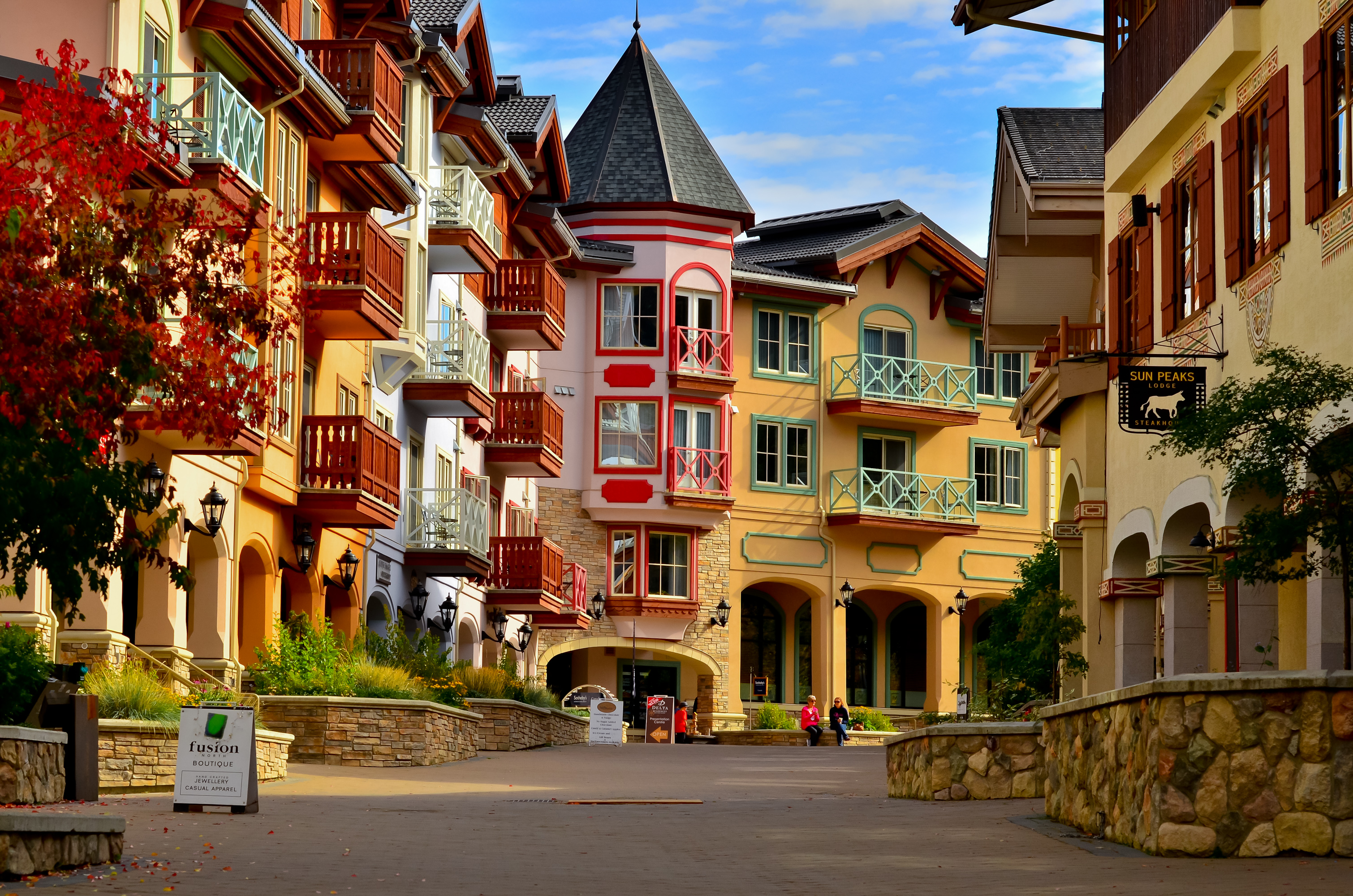
Sun Peaks downtown in autumn

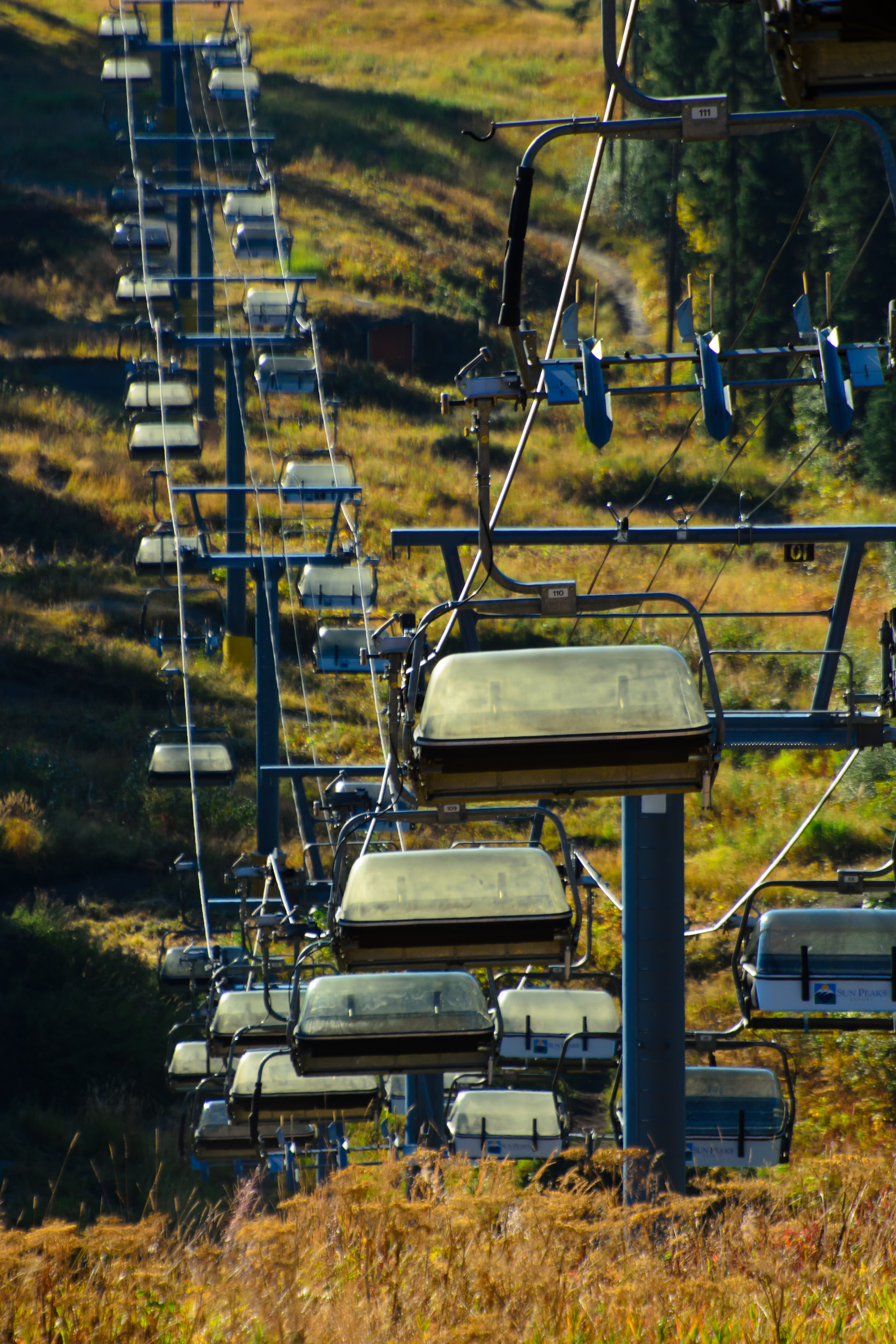
Tod Mountain lifts
