= Mount Perseus (British Columbia) =

Mountain in British Columbia, Canada

- Location within British Columbia
- Interactive map of Mount Perseus

Highest point
- Elevation: 2,553 m (8,376 ft)
- Prominence: 1,683 m (5,522 ft)
- Listing: Mountains of British Columbia; Canada prominent peaks 79th
- Coordinates: 52°21′15″N 120°31′58″W

Geography
- Location: British Columbia, Canada
- District: Cariboo Land District
- Parent range: Quesnel Highland; Cariboo Mountains
- Topo map: NTS 93A7 MacKay River

Mount Perseus is a mountain in British Columbia, Canada. It has an elevation of 2,553 metres (8,376 ft) above sea level and it is one of British Columbia's 102 ultra prominent peaks.

Mount Perseus is the highest peak within a mountainous area between Clearwater Lake (20 km to the southeast of Perseus) and Quesnel Lake (20 km to the northwest).

== See also ==
- List of Ultras of North America
