= Jean Baptiste Lolo =

Indigenous leader in British Columbia (1798–1868)

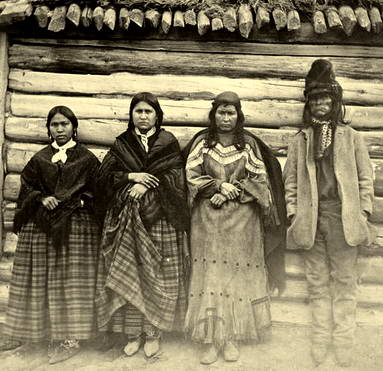
- Chief Jean Baptiste Lolo with his wife and two daughters outside his HBC cabin – 1865
- Born: 1798; Bow River, British North America
- Died: 15 May 1868 (aged 69–70); Thompson's River Post, British Columbia
- Occupations: Interpreter, fur trader

Jean Baptiste Lolo (1798, Bow River, Alberta – 15 May 1868, Thompson's River Post, British Columbia) also known as St. Paul or Chief St. Paul, or Chief Lolo, was an employee and interpreter with the Hudson's Bay Company in pre-Confederation British Columbia, Canada. Son of Chief Michael Okanese 'Little Bone' Cardinal. First serving in the region at Fort Fraser in the New Caledonia fur district, he acquired the nickname there of St. Paul because of his affection for that saint. He was the right-hand man of John Tod and followed him to Fort Kamloops, where Tod was Chief Trader from 1841 to 1843, and remained in that region for the rest of his life. He acquired such great respect among the local Secwepemc (Shuswap) people as to become regarded as a chief.

"His face was a very fine one, although sickness and pain had worn it away terribly. His eyes were black, piercing and restless; his cheekbones high, and the lips, naturally thin and close, had that white, compressed look which tells so surely of constant suffering."

When Mayne remarked that Lolo, in his decayed health, must find it hard to rule over his people,

"... he heard me with a grim smile, and for answer turned back his pillow, where a loaded gun and a naked sword lay ready to his hand."

The invalid Lolo showed, in fact, unexpected reserves of strength. Rising from his bed, he mounted his horse, and accompanied Mayne on a ride to see the view from the top of a neighbouring mountain, which was forthwith named Mt. St. Paul in honour of the old chief. Moreover, Lolo insisted on accompanying Mayne on the next lap of his journey, that from Kamloops to Pavilion."

One of Lolo's daughters, Sophia, wed John Tod in 1843 in a "country marriage" Though many other such marriages in HBC ranks were later abandoned in favour of "proper" wives, Tod kept true to Sophie and remarried her officially in a legal ceremony.

== Legacy ==
Mount Lolo, northeast of Kamloops near Heffley Lake, and Lolo Lake and Lolo Creek in the same vicinity, were named for him. "Paul" and "St. Paul" placenames in the same region (e.g. Paul Lake Provincial Park) are also believed to be derived from his name. Another Mount Lolo on Quadra Island is also believed to be named for him.

== See also ==
- Lolo (disambiguation)
