= Mount Lolo (Quadra Island) =

Mountain in the country of Canada

Coordinates: 50°08′52″N 125°20′39″W

Mount Lolo, 218m is a summit in Sayward Land District on the west side of Quadra Island, British Columbia, Canada, overlooking Seymour Narrows.

== Name origin ==
Mount Lolo is said to be named after Jean Baptiste Lolo, a fur trader and interpreter at Fort Kamloops.
