= Paul Lake Provincial Park =

Provincial park in British Columbia, Canada

Paul Lake
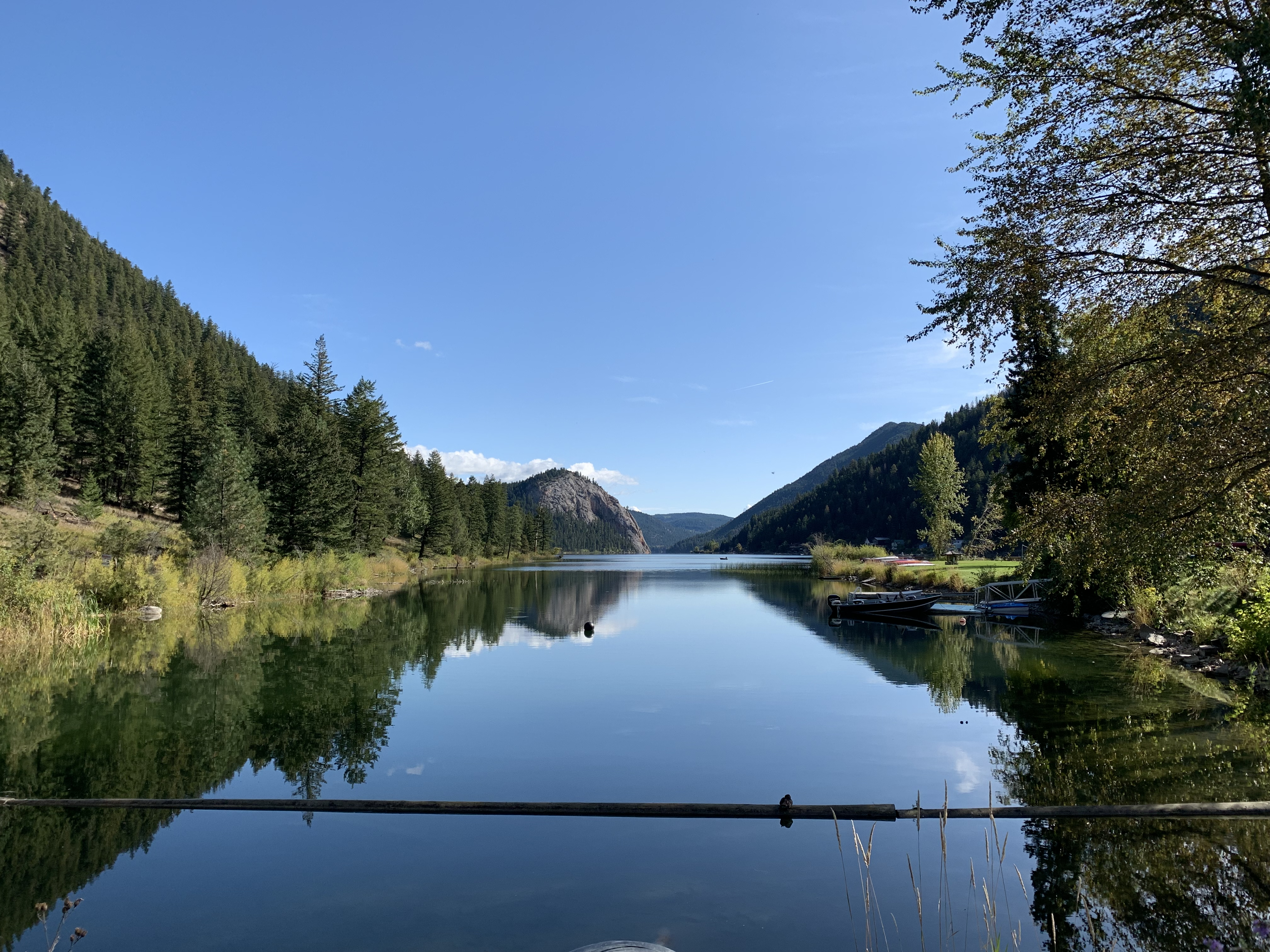
- Paul Lake Provincial Park

- Location within British Columbia Location within Canada
- Location: British Columbia
- Coordinates: 50°44′29″N 120°07′44″W
- Basin countries: Canada
- Max. length: 6.5 kilometres (4.0 mi)
- Max. depth: 45 metres (148 ft)
- Surface elevation: 770 metres (2,530 ft)

Paul Lake Provincial Park is a provincial park in British Columbia, Canada, located southwest of Heffley Lake and to the northeast of the city of Kamloops.

== History ==
The lake is believed to be named for Jean Baptiste Lolo, as is nearby Mount Lolo, who was also known as St. Paul, or Chief St. Paul, and served as an interpreter at Fort Kamloops and became regarded as a chief by the local Secwepemc people, though of Iroquois and French Canadian origin.

== Fauna ==
Originally without fish, Paul Lake was stocked with rainbow trout, which thrived. Subsequent inadvertent introduction of Redside shiners, Richardsonius balteatus initiated a sequence of competition for amphipods and predator-prey interactions that were studied by P.A. Larkin and his students.
