= Lowlow =

Lowlow لولو
- Village
- Location within Iran
- Coordinates: 32°02′01″N 49°49′41″E
- Country: Iran
- Province: Khuzestan
- County: Izeh
- Bakhsh: Susan
- Rural District: Susan-e Gharbi

Population (2006)
  - Total: 288
- Time zone: UTC+3:30 (IRST)
  - Summer (DST): UTC+4:30 (IRDT)

Lowlow (Persian: لولو, also Romanized as Low’low and Lo’lo) is a village in Susan-e Gharbi Rural District, Susan District, Izeh County, Khuzestan province, Iran. At the 2006 census, its population was 288, in 47 families.
