= Loló (footballer, born 1981) =

Angolan footballer

Personal information
- Full name: Lourenço Tomás Cuxixima
- Date of birth: December 13, 1981 (age 44)
- Place of birth: Luanda, Angola
- Position: Forward

Senior career*
Years	Team	Apps	(Gls)
1998–2002	1º de Agosto		
2002–2003	Belenenses	4	(0)
2007	1º de Agosto		
2008–2009	Santos		
2009–2010	Sagrada Esperança		

International career
2002	Angola	1	(0)
- * Club domestic league appearances and goals

Lourenço Tomás Cuxixima (born 3 December 1981), commonly known as Loló, is an Angolan footballer who plays as a forward.

Loló appeared in one match for the Angola national team, in 2002.

== National team statistics ==
Angola national team
Year	Apps	Goals
2002	1	0
Total	1	0
