= Hazelton Mountains =

Group of mountain ranges in British Columbia, Canada

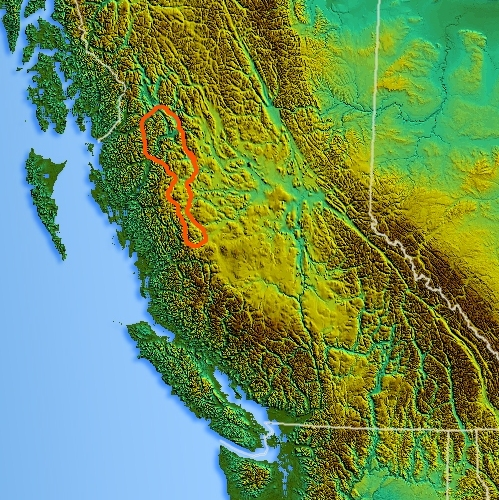
- Location of the Hazelton Mountains

Highest point
- Peak: Weeskinisht Peak
- Elevation: 2,747 m (9,012 ft)
- Coordinates: 54°58′04″N 128°13′55″W

Dimensions
- Area: 25,118 km^{2} (9,698 mi^{2})

Geography
- Country: Canada
- Province: British Columbia
- Range coordinates: 54°N 128°W
- Parent range: Interior Mountains

The Hazelton Mountains are a grouping of mountain ranges on the inland lee of the Kitimat Ranges of the Coast Mountains in northwestern British Columbia, Canada, spanning the area of Hazelton south to the Nechako Reservoir. Defined by the British Columbia geographic names office, they span from the Nass River to the Nechako Plateau, and between the Coast Mountains and the Bulkley River, they are considered by geographers to be part of the Interior Mountains complex, though in local perspective they are considered to be part of the Coast Mountains. They are neighboured on the west by the Kitimat Ranges and on the east by the southernmost section of the Skeena Mountains; beyond the Nass River, which is their northern boundary, are the Boundary Ranges of the Coast Mountains. To their southeast is the Nechako Plateau, including the Quanchus Range on the near-island between Ootsa and Eutsuk Lakes of the Nechako Reservoir (the Quanchus may be considered to be part of the Hazelton Mountains in some classification systems).

The Hazelton Mountains consist of several subranges:

North of the Skeena River:

- Nass Ranges, between the Kitsumkalum (W) and Kitwanga Rivers (E).
  - The Nass Ranges include Tseax Cone, a volcano which killed 2,000 Nisga'a people.
- Kispiox Range, east of the Kitwanga River to the Skeena River.
  - The town of Hazelton, British Columbia is at the range's southeast corner.

South of the Skeena River and west of the Bulkley River:

- Bulkley Ranges, the highest summit is Seven Sisters Peaks, 2,786 m (9,140 ft), southwest of Kitwanga, and which is also the highest summit of the Hazelton Mountains. They include the:
  - Bornite Range
  - Howson Range, the highest summit of which is Howson Peak, 2,759 m (9,052 ft)
  - O.K. Range
  - Rocher Déboulé Range
  - Telkwa Range
- Tahtsa Ranges, including the:
  - Chikamin Range
  - Kasalka Range
  - Morice Range
  - Sibola Range
  - Tochquonyalla Range
  - Whitesail Range
- Pattullo Range
