= Seven Sisters Peaks =

Multi-peak massif in British Columbia, Canada

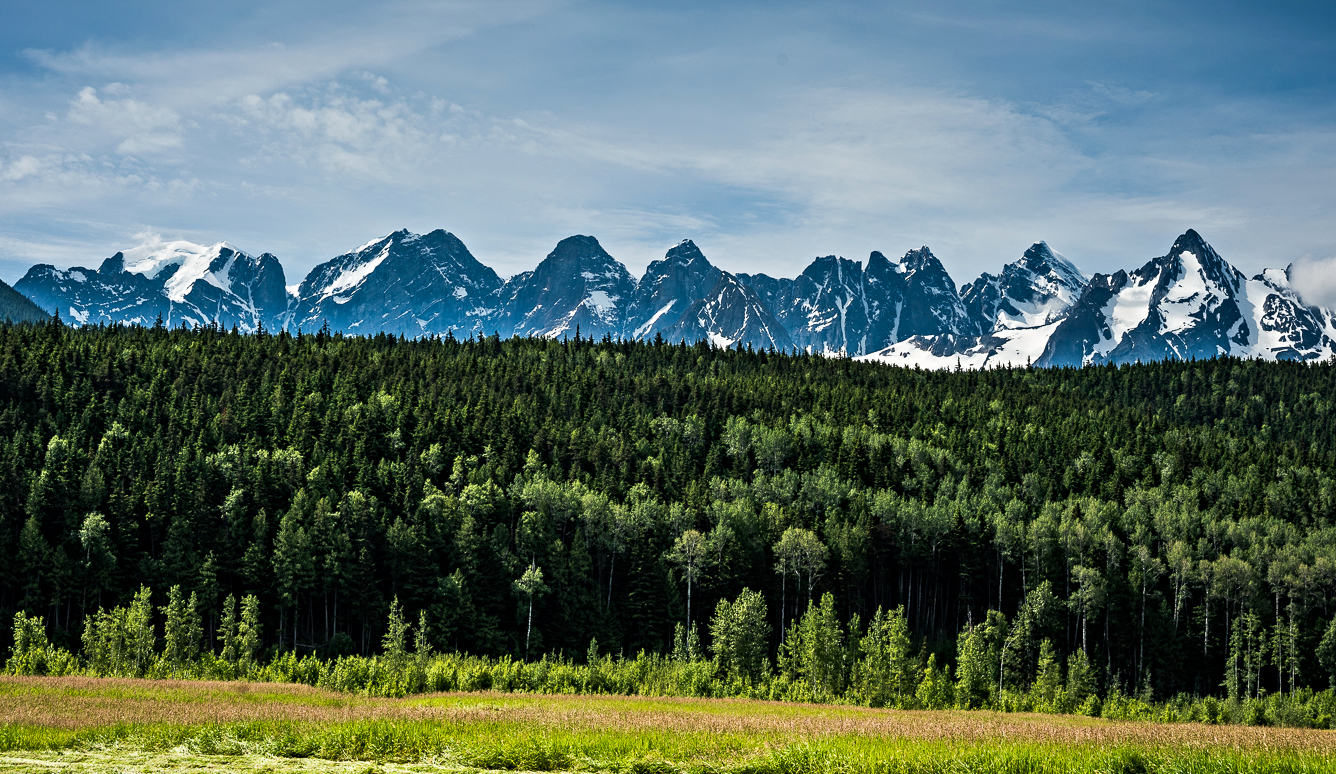
- Seven Sisters Peaks (plus Orion Peak)

Highest point
- Peak: Weeskinisht Peak
- Elevation: 2,747 m (9,012 ft)
- Prominence: 1,862 m (6,109 ft)
- Parent peak: Howson Peak
- Listing: Mountains of British Columbia; Ultras of Canada 51st; Canada highest major peaks 95th
- Coordinates: 54°58′03″N 128°13′56″W

Geography
- Location within British Columbia Location within Canada
- Interactive map of Seven Sister Peaks
- Country: Canada
- Province: British Columbia
- District: Range 5 Coast Land District
- Protected area: Seven Sisters Provincial Park
- Range coordinates: 54°58′25″N 128°12′39″W
- Parent range: Bulkley Ranges; Hazelton Mountains; Interior Mountains
- Topo map: NTS 103I16 Dorreen

Climbing
- First ascent: 1941 Neal Carter, K. Carter, G. Baker, J. Cade

Seven Sisters Peaks is a 2,747-metre (9,012-foot) multi-summit massif located in the Bulkley Ranges of the Interior Mountains in British Columbia, Canada. The massif is situated within Seven Sisters Provincial Park and Protected Area, 10 km (6 mi) southeast of Cedarvale, south of Orion Peak, and surrounded by Seven Sisters Glacier. The highest peak of the seven is called Weeskinisht Peak. Precipitation runoff from the mountain and meltwater from the glacier drains into tributaries of the Skeena River. The nearest higher peak is Howson Peak, 68.8 km (43 mi) to the south-southeast.

== Climate ==
Based on the Köppen climate classification, Seven Sisters Peaks is located in a subarctic climate zone with cold, snowy winters, and mild summers. Winter temperatures can drop below −20 °C with wind chill factors below −30 °C.

== Etymology ==
Seven Sisters Mountain was the name adopted in 1948, but the mountain's toponym was changed and officially adopted October 4, 1951, by the Geographical Names Board of Canada.

The individually named peaks of the massif from west to east are Tlooki Peak, Weeskinisht Peak, Tagai Peak, Tingi Peak, Kitshin Peak, Kletoosho Peak, and Tuatoosho Peak, which are the Tsimshian/Gitxsan words for One, "Top of the Mountain", Three, Four, Five, Six, and Seven, respectively. With the exception of Weeskinisht, the other names were submitted by Neal M. Carter of the Alpine Club of Canada and officially adopted in 1977.

== Summits of Seven Sisters Peaks ==
Name	Elevation	Prominence	First ascent	Reference
Tlooki Peak	2,571 m (8,435 ft)	121 m (397 ft)	1958 Chris Mair	
Weeskinisht Peak	2,747 m (9,012 ft)	1,862 m (6,109 ft)	1941 Neal Carter	
Tagai Peak	2,660 m (8,730 ft)	130 m (430 ft)	1962 Shives & Brown	
Tingi Peak	2,534 m (8,314 ft)	49 m (161 ft)		
Kitshin Peak	2,580 m (8,460 ft)	170 m (560 ft)		
Kletoosho Peak	2,597 m (8,520 ft)	207 m (679 ft)		
Tuatoosho Peak	2,621 m (8,599 ft)	251 m (823 ft)		

== Gallery ==
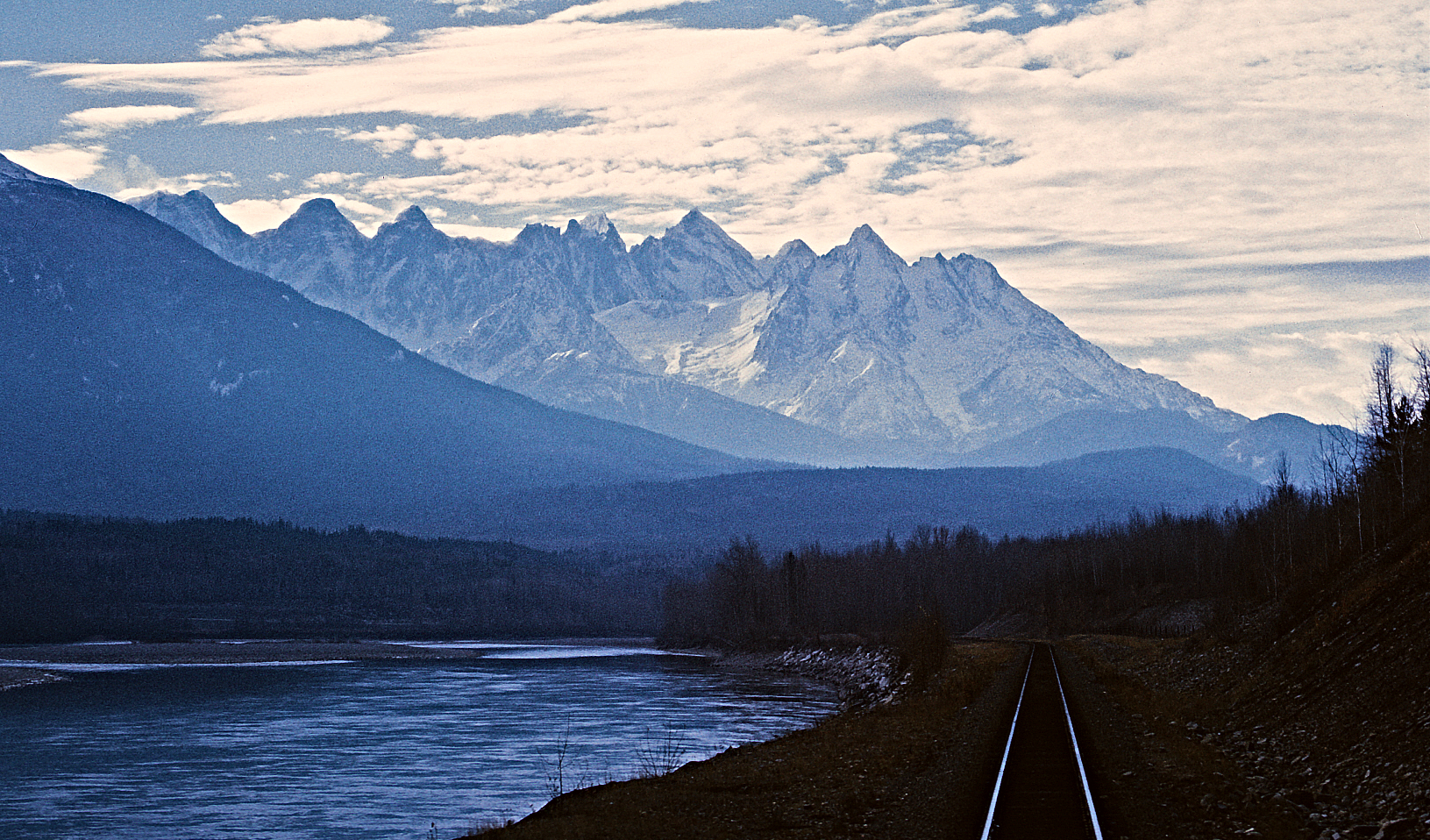
Seven Sisters Peaks seen with Orion Peak (furthermost right), and Skeena River

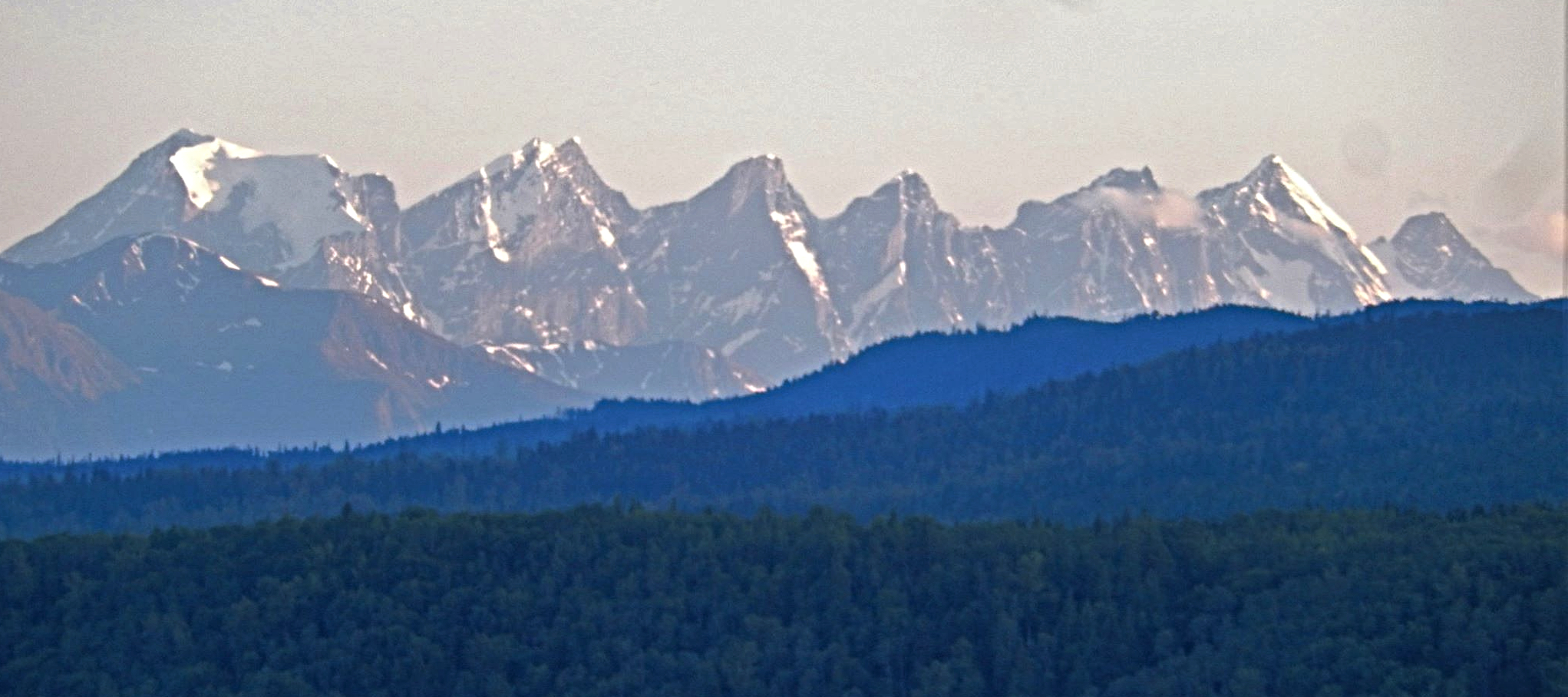
Left to right: Tuatoosho, Kletoosho, Kitshin, Tingi, Tagai, Weeskinisht, Tlooki.

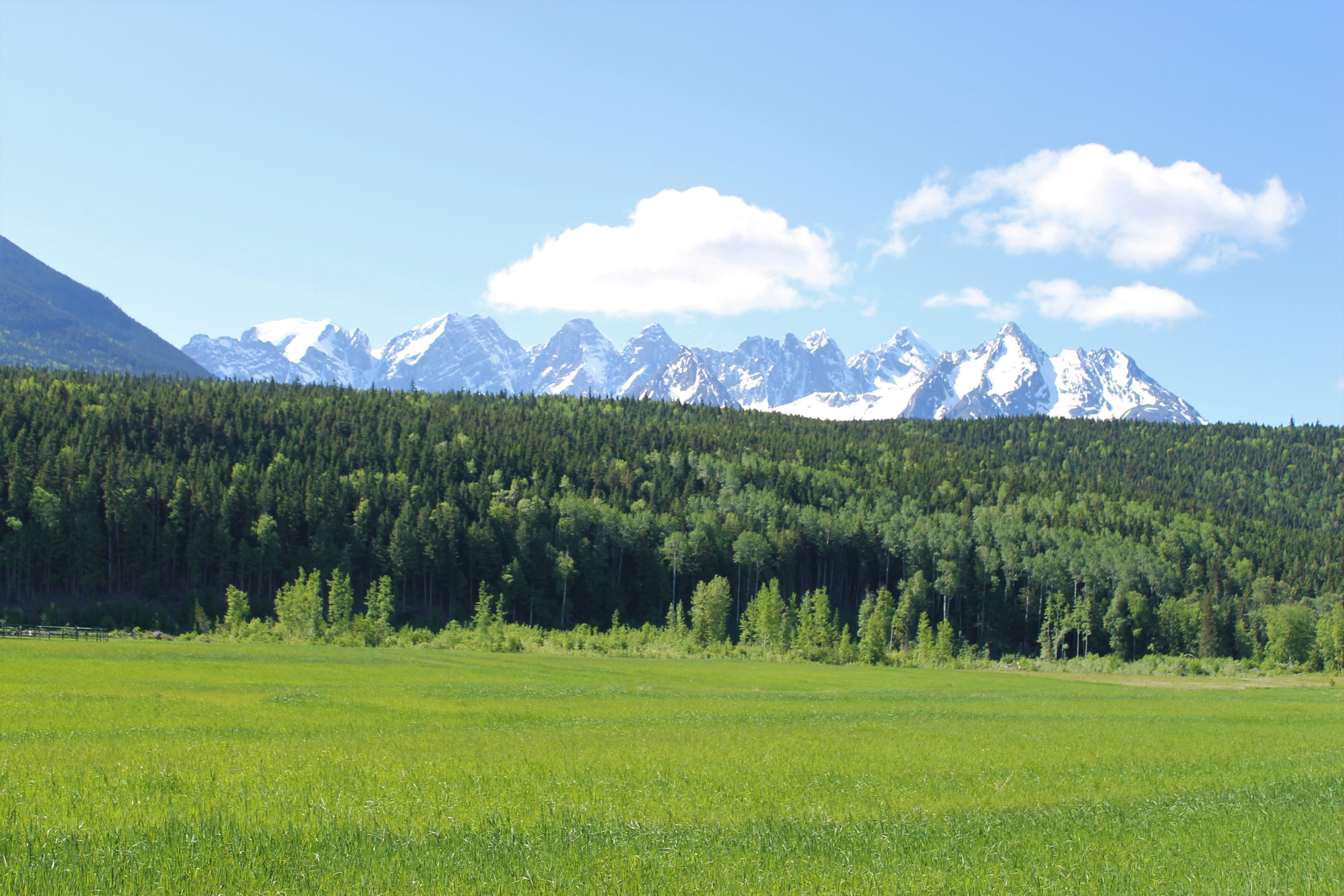
The peaks as seen from the Yellowhead Highway and Skeena River

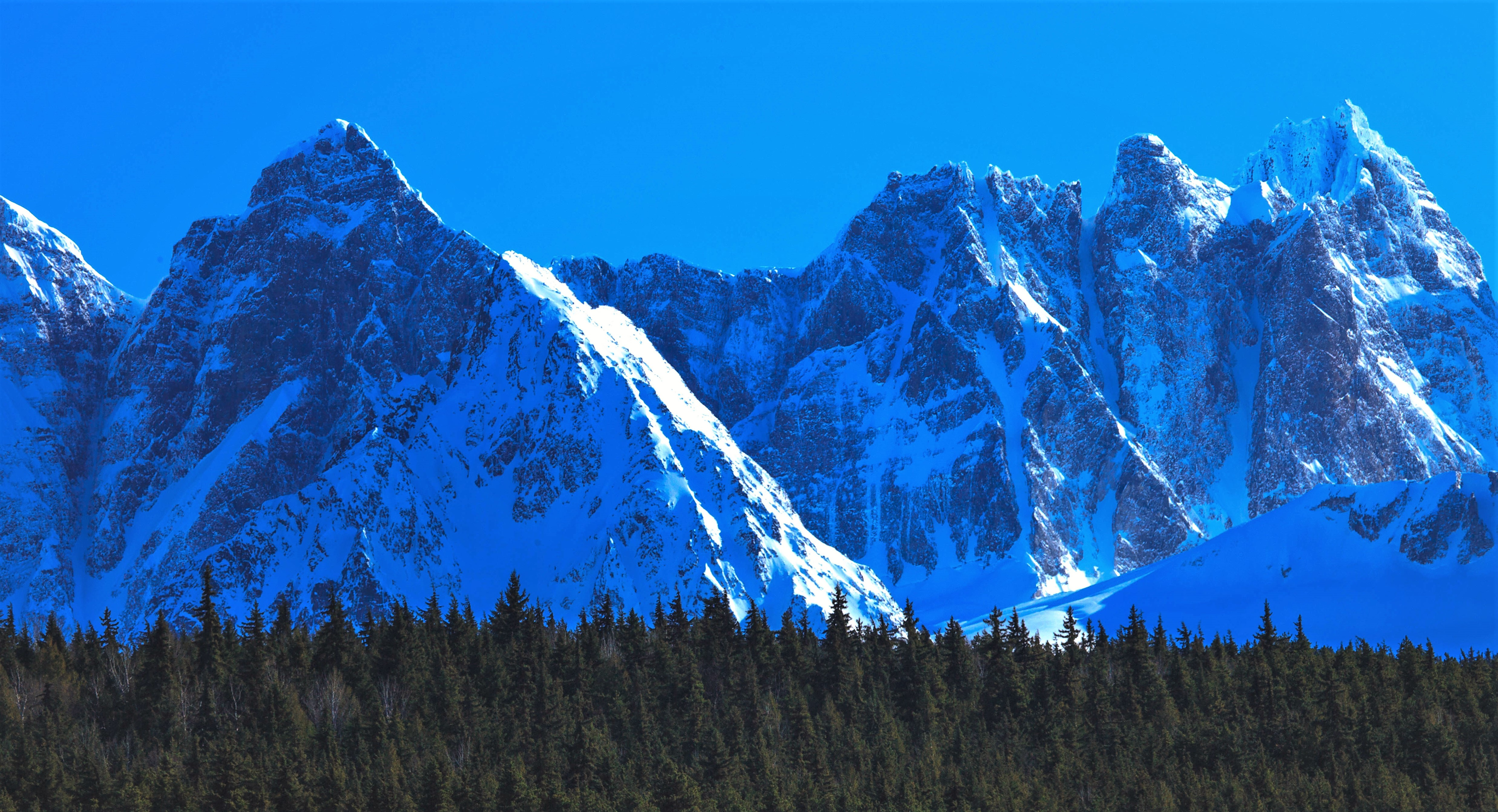
Tingi Peak (left) and Tagai Peak (right)

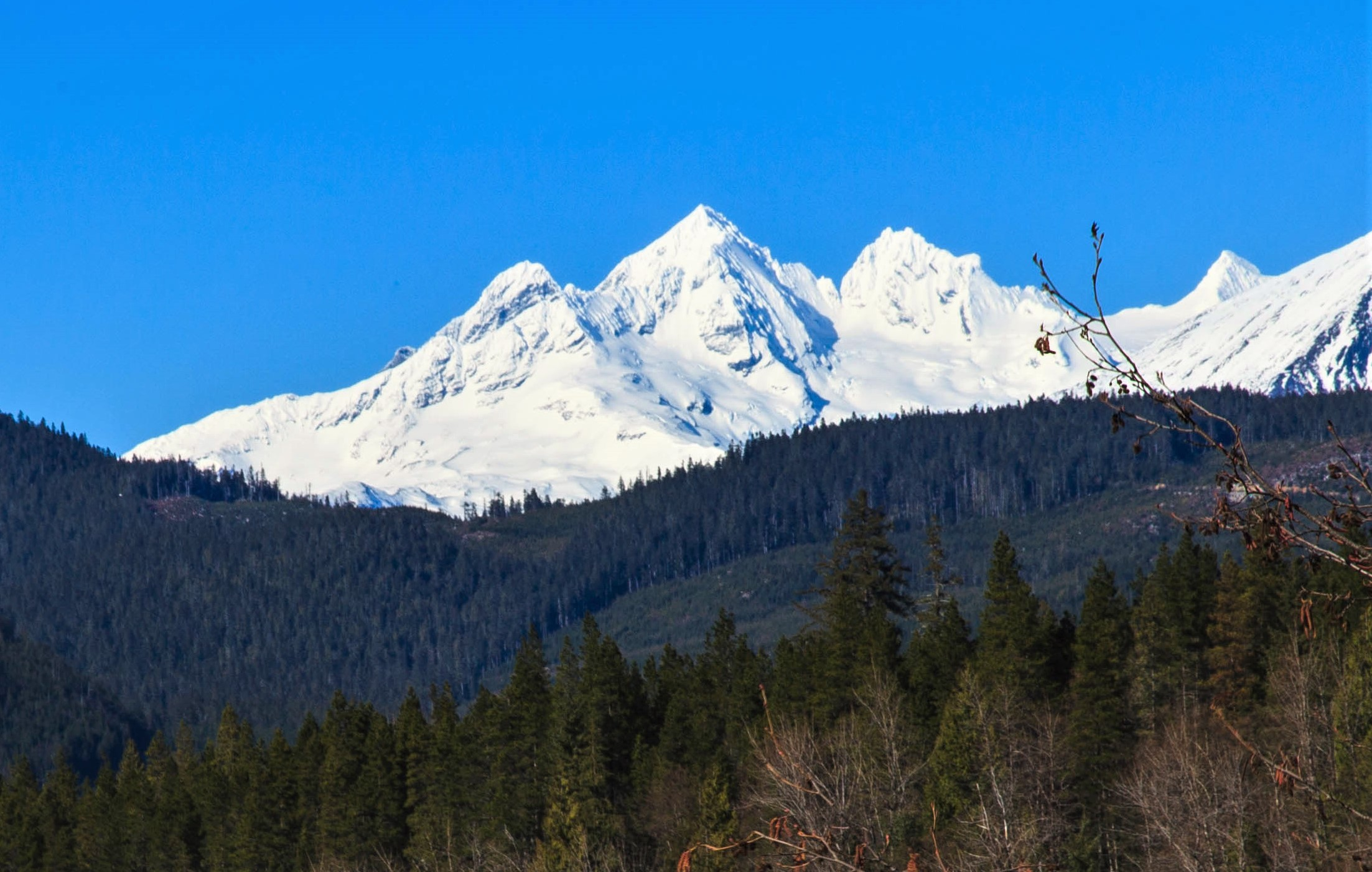
Tlooki Peak (left), Weeskinisht Peak, and Tagai Peak (right) seen from south.

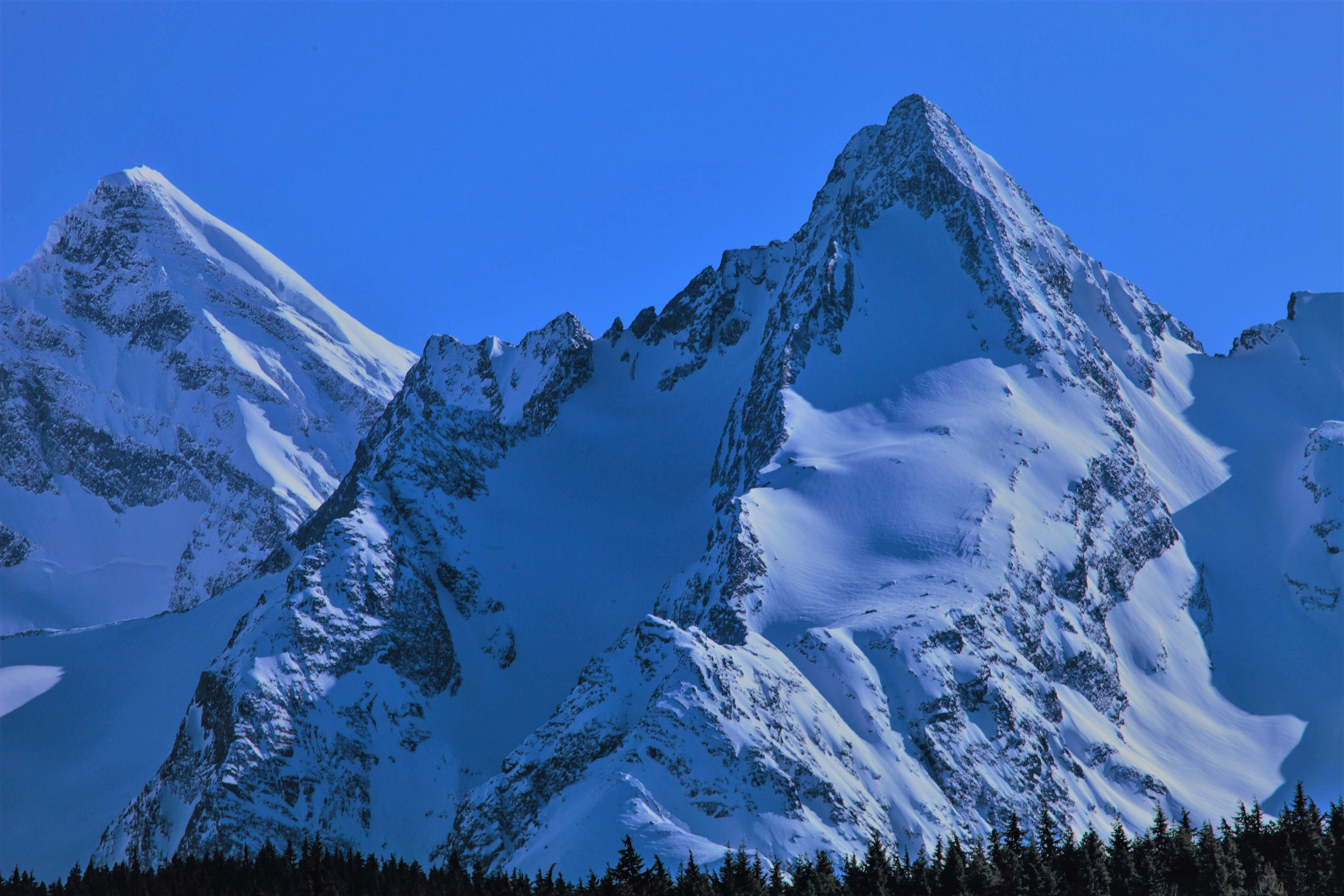
Weeskinisht Peak (left), Orion Peak (right).

== See also ==
- Geography of British Columbia
