= Zymoetz River =

River in British Columbia

Zymoetz River Copper River
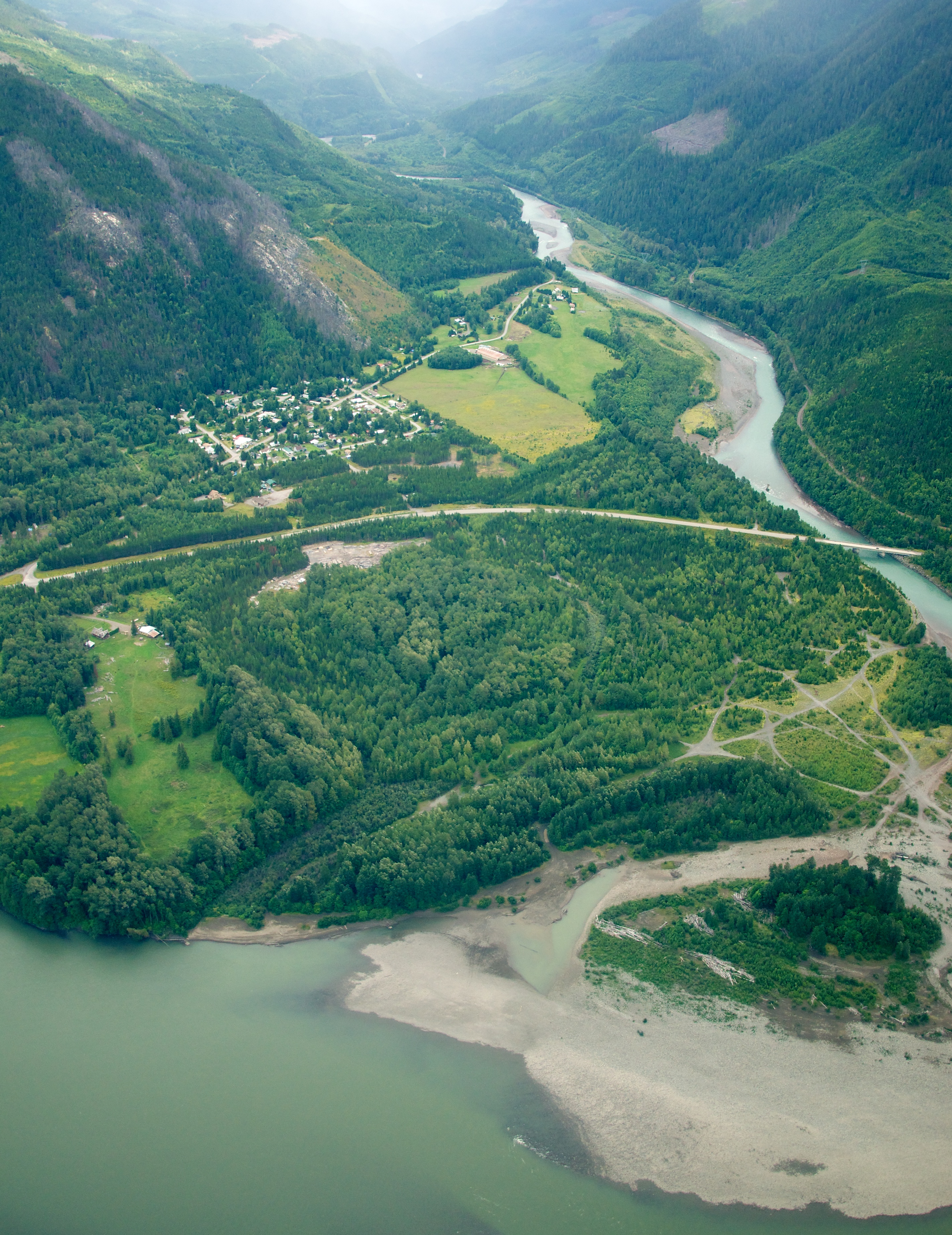

- Mouth of the Zymoetz River

Location
- Country: Canada
- Province: British Columbia
- District: Range 5 Coast Land District

Physical characteristics
- Source: Bulkley Ranges
  - location: Hazelton Mountains
  - coordinates: 54°44′1″N 127°22′25″W
  - elevation: 1,078 m (3,537 ft)
- Mouth: Skeena River
  - location: Just east of Terrace, British Columbia
  - coordinates: 54°32′42″N 128°29′9″W
  - elevation: 78 m (256 ft)
- Length: 145 km (90 mi)
- Basin size: 3,026 km^{2} (1,168 sq mi),
- Discharge
  - average: 114 m^{3}/s (4,000 cu ft/s)
  - maximum: 3,140 m^{3}/s (111,000 cu ft/s)

Basin features
- Tributaries
  - left: Serb Creek, Blackberry Creek, Miligit Creek, Many Bear Creek, Limonite Creek, Kitnaykwa River, Clore River, Mattson Creek, Eight Mile Creek, Magee Creek
  - right: Spruce Camp Creek, Henderson Creek, Silvern Creek, Passby Creek, Sandstone Creek, Coal Creek, Mulwain Creek, Red Canyon Creek, Treasure Creek, Nogold Creek, Mattock Creek, Harvey Creek, Salmon Run Creek, McNeil Creek, Dardanelle Creek, O.K. Creek
- Topo map: NTS103I9 Usk

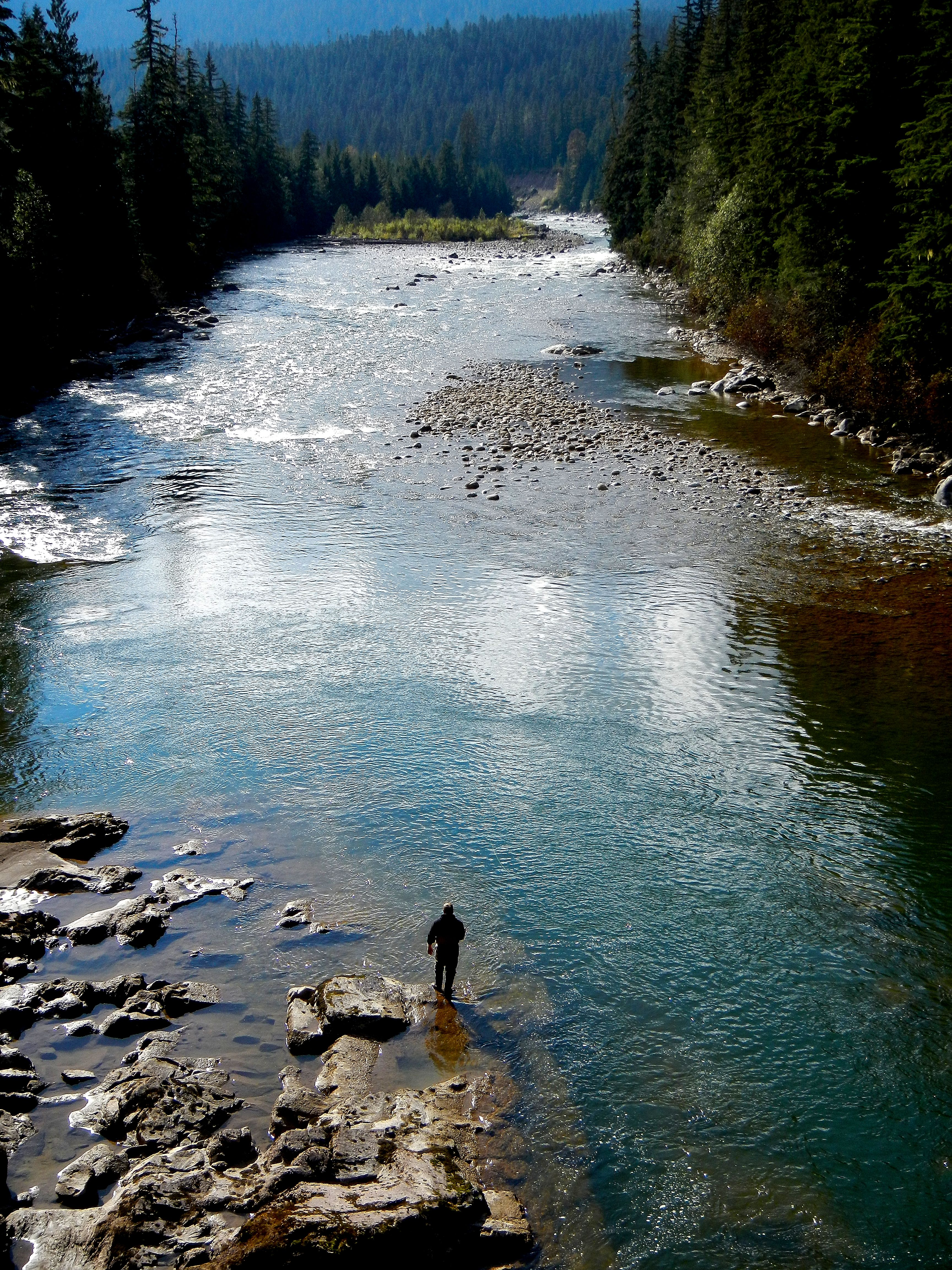
Zymoetz River

The Zymoetz River (formerly Copper River) is a tributary of the Skeena River in northwestern part of the province of British Columbia, Canada. From its source in the Bulkley Ranges of the Hazelton Mountains the Zymoetz River flows southeast for about 145 km (90 mi) to empty into the Skeena River in the Zaimoetz 5 Indian Reserve of the Kitselas First Nation.

The Zymoetz River's drainage basin covers 3,026 km^{2} (1,168 sq mi). The river's mean annual discharge is estimated at 114 m^{3}/s (4,000 cu ft/s), with most of the flow occurring between May and October. According to the stream gauge "08EF005 Zymoetz River Above O.K. Creek", the Zymoetz's maximum recorded instantaneous discharge was 3,140 m^{3}/s (111,000 cu ft/s), on 1 November 1978. The Zymoetz watershed's land cover is classified as 56.8% conifer forest, 17.8% barren, 13.3% snow/glacier, and small amounts of other cover. The mouth of the Zymoetz River is located about 8 km (5.0 mi) west of Terrace, British Columbia, about 57 km (35 mi) north of Kitimat, about 120 km (75 mi) east of Prince Rupert, British Columbia, and about 380 km (240 mi) west of Prince George, British Columbia.

Most of the Zymoetz River's drainage basin lies within the traditional territory of the Tsimshian Kitselas First Nation of the Kitselas people. The Burnie River tributary area is part of the traditional territory of the Wetʼsuwetʼen First Nation.

The meaning of "Zymoetz" is unclear. It may come from a Tsimshianic word meaning "palm of the hand".

== Geography ==
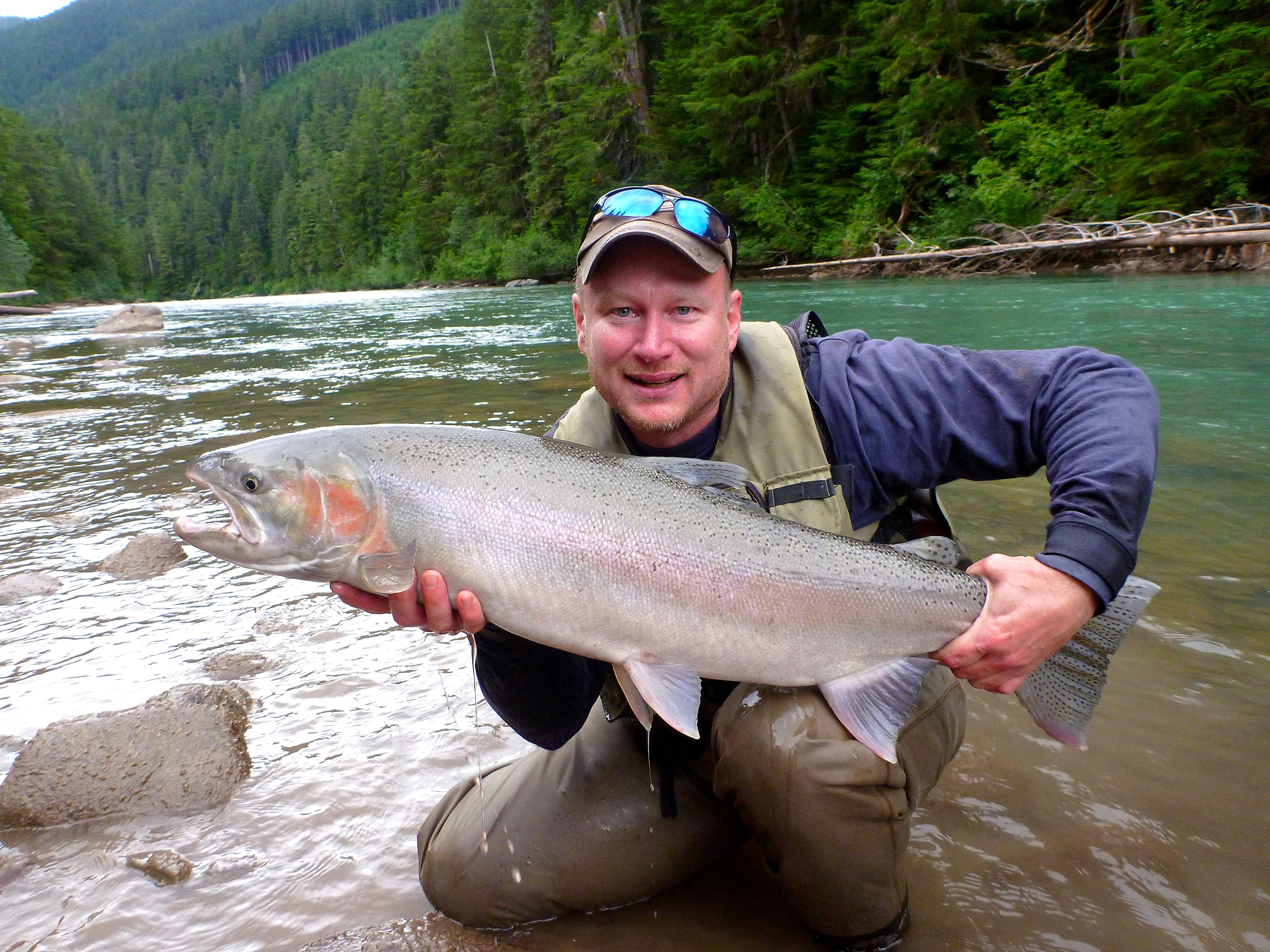
Steelhead caught on the Zymoetz (Copper) River

The Zymoetz River originates in the Bulkley Ranges, a subrange of the Hazelton Mountains, on the west side of Hudson Bay Mountain, west of the town of Smithers. The upper Zymoetz River flows westward through Aldrich Lake, Dennis Lake, and McDonell Lake. It is joined by tributary streams including Silvern Creek, and Passby Creek. After exiting McDonell Lake the Zymoetz continues flowing west, collecting the tributaries of Serb Creek, Sandstone Creek, Coal Creek, Mulwain Creek, and Red Canyon Creek, then turns south. The middle, southward flowing portion of the Zymoetz River collects tributaries including Treasure Creek, Blackberry Creek, Miligit Creek, Many Bear Creek, Nogold Creek, Mattock Creek, and Limonite Creek, South of the Limonite confluence the Zymoetz River is joined by the Kitnayakwa River, after which the Zymoetz turns to flow west.

In its lower westward flowing reach, the Zymoetz runs between the Bornite Range and the O.K. Range, both part of the Hazelton Mountains. It is joined from the south by its largest tributary, the Clore River, then Salmon Run Creek, which joins from the north. After that the Zymoetz is joined by Mattson Creek, McNeil Creek, Dardanelle Creek, O.K. Creek, Eight Mile Creek, and Magee Creek. A few kilometers after Magee Creek, the Zymoetz River empties into the Skeena River within Zaimoetz Indian Reserve No. 5 of the Kitselas First Nation.

Most of the Zymoetz River's tributaries are small. The largest is the Clore River, which drains 985 km^{2} (380 sq mi) south of the Zymoetz River, and has an average discharge of 44.2 m^{3}/s (1,560 cu ft/s). The Clore River's main tributary is the Burnie River, with a drainage basin 364 km^{2} (141 sq mi) large and an average discharge of 11.9 m^{3}/s (420 cu ft/s). Other notable tributaries of the Zymoetz River include the Kitnayakwa River, which drains an area 260 km^{2} (100 sq mi) large, and has an average dischage of 12.3 m^{3}/s (430 cu ft/s) average discharge; Serb Creek, with a 160 km^{2} (62 sq mi) large basin size, and an average discharge of 5.73 m^{3}/s (202 cu ft/s); and Mulwain Creek, with a 132 km^{2} (51 sq mi) large basin size, and an average discharge of 3.81 m^{3}/s (135 cu ft/s).

Near its confluence with the Skeena River the Zymoetz River is crossed by British Columbia Highway 16, which runs along the Skeena River. Canadian National Railway tracks run along the north side of the Skeena River.

The Zymoetz River has a relatively steep gradient. The lower Zymoetz is constrained by two canyons, one about 6.4 km (4.0 mi) above the river's mouth, and the other about 9.6 km (6.0 mi) above its mouth. A natural gas pipeline crosses the watershed, running through the Limonite Creek drainage and over Telkwa Pass to the Telkwa River valley.

There are numerous high mountains over 2,000 m (6,600 ft) tall in and along the drainage divides of the Zymoetz watershed, including Howson Peak (2759 m), Hudson Bay Mountain (2589 m), Polemic Peak (2579 m), Mount Sir Robert (2375 m), Andesite Peak (2366 m), Mount Henderson (2325 m), Cumulus Mountain (2292 m), Pillar Peak (2146 m), Mountt Clore (2053 m), and others.

There are several protected areas in the Zymoetz River watershed. The Swan Creek Protected Area, which protects a small, steep, unlogged watershed, is located just south of the Zymoetz River near Salmon Run Creek. The Burnie River's watershed is almost entirely within Burnie-Shea Park and the Burnie River Protected Area.

== Wildlife ==
The Zymoetz River is known for its steelhead trout (Oncorhynchus mykiss). The river has attracted many anglers and the annual steelhead catch has been one of the top ten for British Columbia rivers. The river also supports salmon runs of pink, chinook, sockeye, coho, and chum.

However, fishery health has declined in recent decades due to various factors such as forestry development and by pipeline and electrical transmission corridor clearing activities, as well as several incidents of pipeline breaks. Floodplain logging has severely impacted fish populations and substantially reduced riparian habitat in the Zymoetz watershed, especially along the lower portion of the river.

== Development ==
For millennia the Gitxsan, Tsimshian Kitselas, and Wetʼsuwetʼen people relied heavily on the anadromous Pacific salmon and trout runs of the Zymoetz River. Indigenous fishing included a weir at McDonell Lake on the upper Zymoetz River, spearing sites in the lower river, among other sites and activities. Tradition use of the watershed included a network of trails, village sites, and fish houses.

Grand Trunk Pacific Railway (GTP) surveyed a route along the Zymoetz and Telkwa Rivers but chose a route through Bulkley River valley instead.

Today the primary human activities in the Zymoetz watershed are recreation, logging, mining, and linear development such as electric power transmission lines and gas pipelines. Forest harvesting began in the 1950s with the construction of a mainline forestry road up the river. The western part of the Zymoetz watershed is within the Kalum Forest District, and the eastern part in the Bulkley Timber Supply Area.

An electric power transmission line runs through the Zymoetz watershed. It crosses Telkwa Pass into the Zymoetz watershed and follows the lower Zymoetz River to the Skeena.

In 1974 a flood caused critical damage to a gas pipeline, requiring immediate repair. The pipeline was owned by Pacific Northern Gas (PNG). In 2011 PNG was bought by AltaGas. PNG repairs took about three weeks and involved diverting the Zymoetz River, resulted in damage to steelhead habitat and spawning grounds. On 8 June 2002 a landslide severed the pipeline over a length of tens of meters. The pipeline rupture caused an intense fire.

Another gas pipeline, the Coastal GasLink pipeline has been built through the southern part of the Zymoetz watershed, crossing the Clore River tributary. Construction of this pipeline drew large protests, especially in Wetʼsuwetʼen territory just east of the Zymoetz and including parts of the southeastern portion of the Zymoetz watershed. In addition to various other pipeline concerns, a 2023 incident where the pipeline crosses The Zymoetz's main tributary, the Clore River, sparked protests. Damage to fish habitat has drawn protests and criticism. The Clore River pipeline incident resulted in a $600,000 fine issued by British Columbia's Environmental Assessment Office.

== See also ==
- List of rivers of British Columbia
