= Orion Peak =

Mountain in British Columbia, Canada

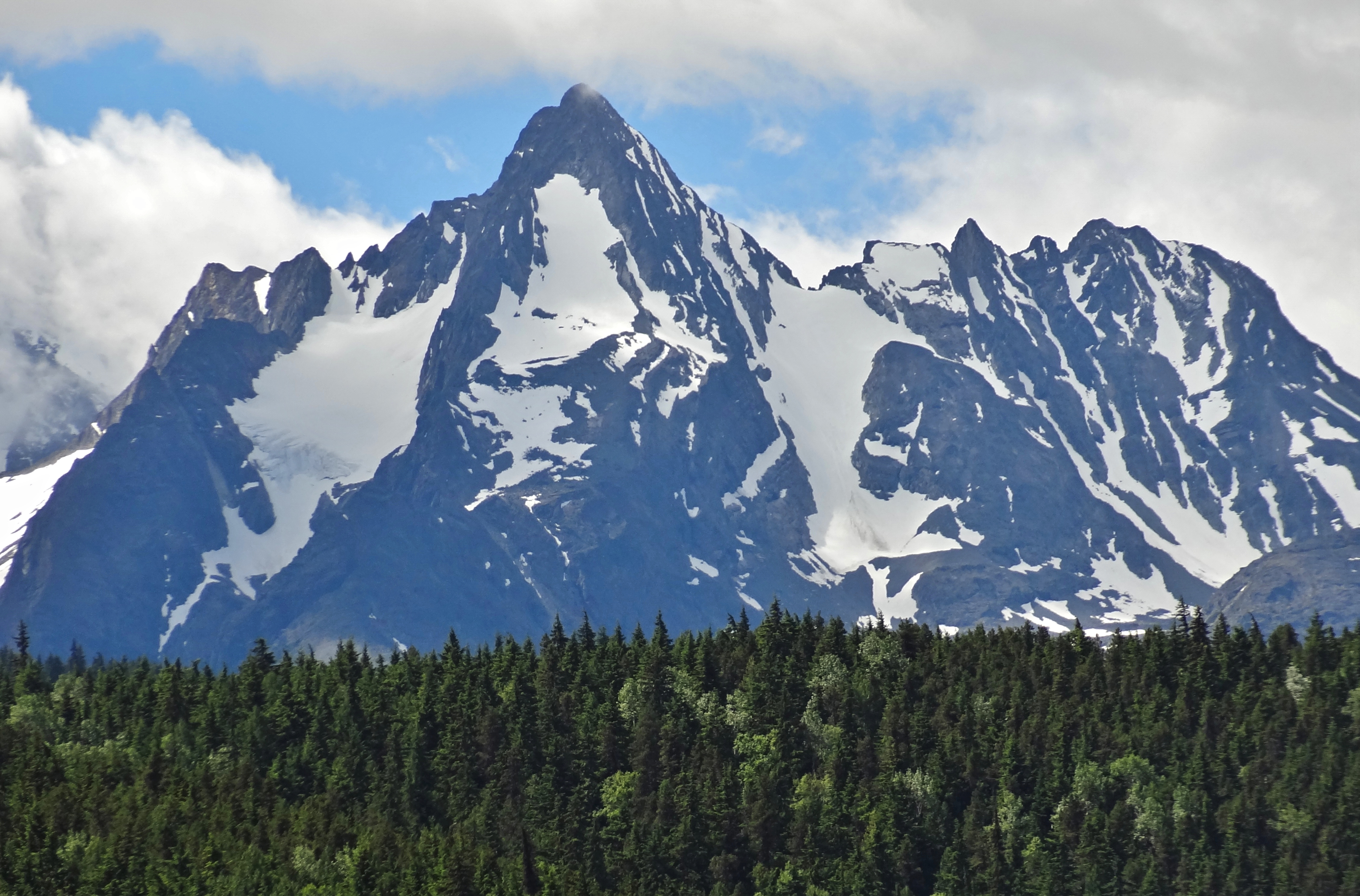
- Orion Peak, north aspect

Highest point
- Elevation: 2,254 m (7,395 ft)
- Prominence: 429 m (1,407 ft)
- Parent peak: Seven Sisters Peaks
- Listing: Mountains of British Columbia
- Coordinates: 54°59′34″N 128°13′34″W

Geography
- Location within British Columbia Location within Canada
- Interactive map of Orion Peak
- Country: Canada
- Province: British Columbia
- District: Range 5 Coast Land District
- Protected area: Seven Sisters Provincial Park
- Parent range: Bulkley Ranges; Hazelton Mountains; Interior Mountains
- Topo map: NTS 103I16 Dorreen

Orion Peak is a 2,254-metre (7,395-foot) mountain summit located in the Bulkley Ranges of the Hazelton Mountains in northern British Columbia, Canada.

== Location ==
The peak is situated within the Seven Sisters Provincial Park and Protected Area, 7 km (4 mi) southeast of Cedarvale, and north of the Seven Sisters Peaks massif and Seven Sisters Glacier.

== Geography ==
Precipitation runoff from the mountain and meltwater from the glacier drain into tributaries of the Skeena River.

== Climate ==
Based on the Köppen climate classification, Orion Peak is located in a subarctic climate zone with cold, snowy winters, and mild summers. Temperatures can drop below −20 °C with wind chill factors below −30 °C.

== Name ==
The mountain's name was officially adopted August 25, 1977, by the Geographical Names Board of Canada, as identified in Dick Culbert's 1964 Climbers Guide to the Coastal Ranges of British Columbia.

== Gallery ==
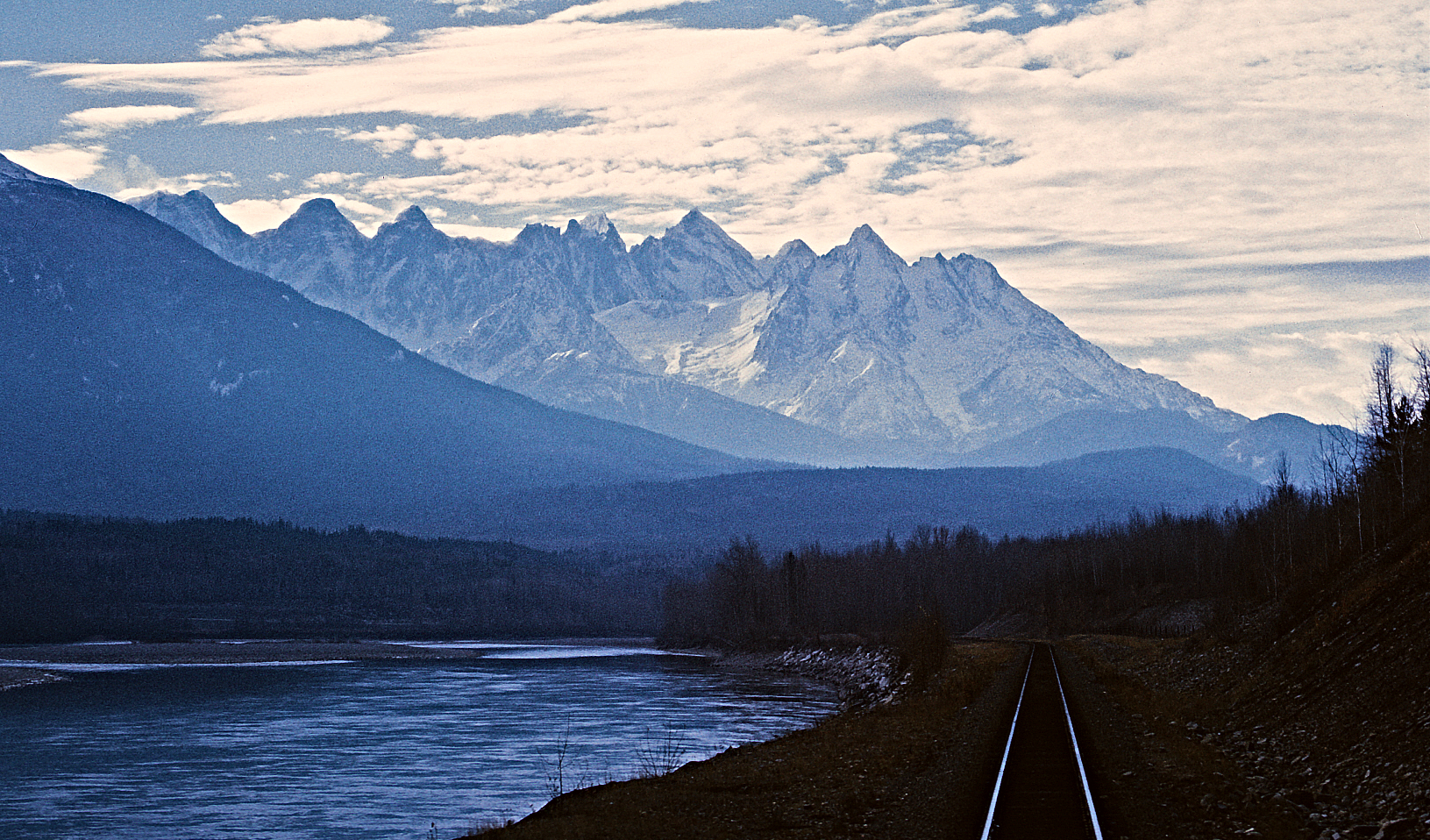
Orion Peak furthermost to right, seen with Seven Sisters Peaks and Skeena River

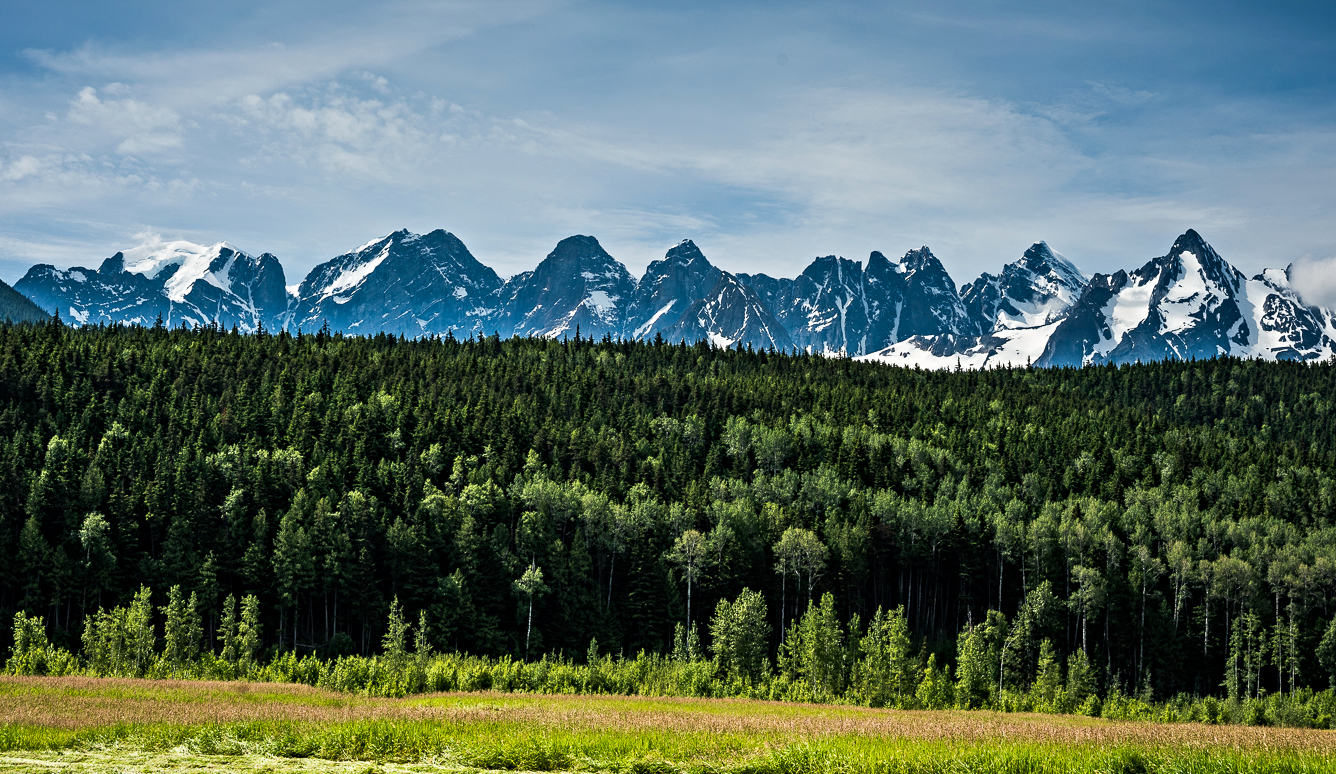
Seven Sisters Peaks with Orion Peak furthermost to right

== See also ==
- Geography of British Columbia
