= Atna Peak (British Columbia) =

Mountain in British Columbia

- Location within British Columbia
- Interactive map of Atna Peak

Highest point
- Elevation: 2,724 m (8,937 ft)
- Prominence: 1,794 m (5,886 ft)
- Listing: Mountains of British Columbia
- Coordinates: 53°56′23.0″N 128°02′44.0″W

Geography
- Location: Inland British Columbia
- District: Range 4 Coast Land District
- Parent range: Howson Range
- Topo map: NTS 103H16 Kildala Arm

Atna Peak is a mountain in British Columbia, Canada, located 57 km (35 mi) northwest of Howson Peak and 18 km (11 mi) southeast of Morice Lake.
