= Tsaydaychuz Peak =

Mountain in British Columbia, Canada

- Location within British Columbia

Highest point
- Elevation: 2,758 m (9,049 ft)
- Prominence: 1,826 m (5,991 ft)
- Listing: Mountains of British Columbia; Canada highest major peaks 89th; Canada prominent peaks 56th
- Coordinates: 53°01′16″N 126°38′33″W

Geography
- Location: British Columbia, Canada
- District: Range 4 Coast Land District
- Parent range: Pattullo Range; Hazelton Mountains
- Topo map: NTS 93E2 Tesla Lake

Tsaydaychuz Peak, 2758 m (9049 feet), prominence below Howson Peak is 1826 m, is a mountain in the Pattullo Range of the Hazelton Mountains, the southernmost subdivision of the Northern Interior Mountains system of the British Columbia Interior. The Pattullo Range, of which Tsaydaychuz is the highest summit, is located south of Tesla and Eutsuk Lakes and to the north of the Dean River. To its east is the Nechako Plateau. The first ascent of this peak occurred on 3 September 1978 by Glenn Woodsworth and Carol Evenchick using the Southeast ridge route.

== See also ==
- List of Ultras of Canada
