= Pattullo =

Pattullo may refer to:

== People with the surname ==
- George Pattullo (disambiguation), various people
- June Pattullo (1921-1972), American oceanographer
- Polly Pattullo, British author and journalist
- Duff Pattullo (Thomas Dufferin Pattullo, 1873-1956), Canadian premier of British Columbia

== Places ==
- Pattullo Range, mountain range of Rockies in British Columbia
- Pattullo Bridge, Vancouver bridge
