= Hudson Bay Mountain =

Mountain in British Columbia, Canada

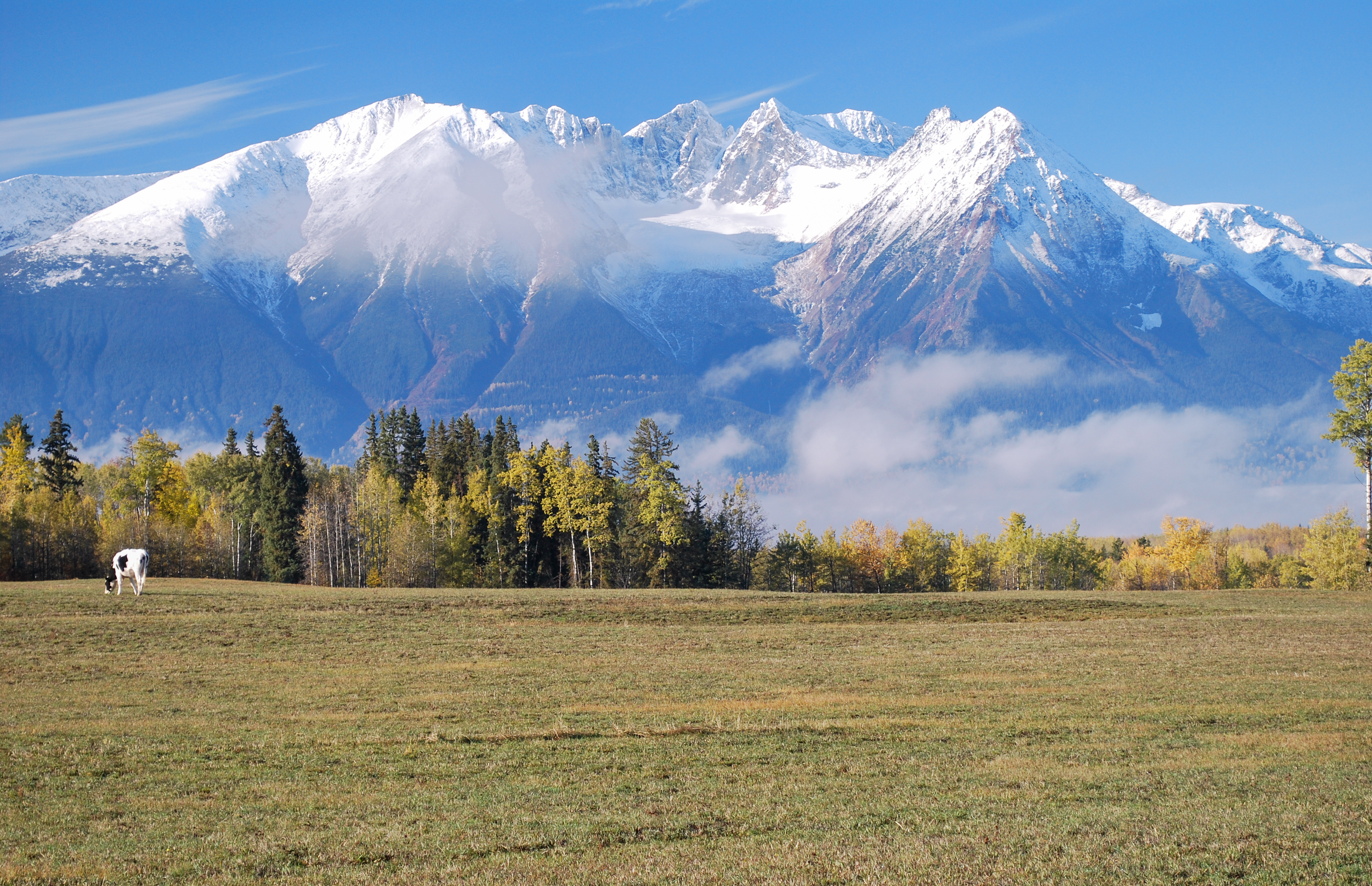
- Hudson Bay Mountain seen from the east

Highest point
- Elevation: 2,589 m (8,494 ft)
- Prominence: 1,609 m (5,279 ft)
- Listing: Mountains of British Columbia; Ultras of Canada; Highest major summits of Canada
- Coordinates: 54°48′42″N 127°20′23″W

Geography
- Location within British Columbia Location within Canada
- Interactive map of Hudson Bay Mountain
- Location: Regional District of Bulkley-Nechako, British Columbia, Canada
- District: Range 5 Coast Land District
- Parent range: Bulkley Ranges → Hazelton Mountains
- Topo map: NTS 93L14 Smithers

Climbing
- First ascent: 1940s by Rex Gibson, John Wheeler

Hudson Bay Mountain Resort
- Interactive map of Hudson Bay Mountain Resort
- Location: British Columbia, Canada
- Nearest city: Smithers
- Coordinates: 54.811633°N 127.33962°W
- Vertical: 508m, 1666ft
- Top elevation: 1650m, 5413ft
- Base elevation: 1142m, 3747ft
- Skiable area: 700 acres
- Trails: 44
- Longest run: 8km, 4.97 miles
- Terrain parks: 1

Hudson Bay Mountain is an ultra prominent peak located above Smithers, British Columbia, Canada. It is the location of the Hudson Bay Mountain Resort (formerly Ski Smithers) ski resort. It was also used as a filming location for the movies The Grey and Eight Below. A well-established local name, it refers to the mountain's proximity to a ranch once owned by the Hudson's Bay Company at nearby Driftwood Creek. Hudson Bay Mountain Resort is known for the Rotary Community Trail to Town, an 8 kilometres (5.0 mi) run down the mountain into the town of Smithers.

== Ski facilities ==
Lifts:

Name	Type
Skyline	Chairlift - Triple
Panorama	T-bar
Prairie	T-bar
Little Rascal	Handle Tow

Runs :

Name	Difficulty
Alpenhorn	Black Diamond
Alpine Meadows	Green Circle
Bob's Your Uncle	Black Diamond
Cabin Runs	Green Circle
Cannonball	Blue Square
Chapman's Challenge	Black Diamond
Cinderella	Blue Square
Cold Smoke	Double Black Diamond
Cutoff	Blue Square
Dahlie's Double	Black Diamond
Expo	Blue Square
Footloose	Blue Square
Holy Smoke	Double Black Diamond
Lower Gully	Blue Square
Marmot Hallow	Green Circle
Monkey Trail	Blue Square
Name That Run	Black Diamond
Nancy Greene	Green Circle
North Face Ski Way	Green Circle
Panorama	Green Circle
Parliament	Black Diamond
Pitchfork	Blue Square
Prairie Road	Green Circle
Ptarmigan	Blue Square
Ranger Run	Green Circle
Short Cut	Green Circle
Skybound	Green Circle
Skyline Connector	Green Circle
Snowbound	Black Diamond
The Fork	Blue Square
Trail to Town	Green Circle
Turkey Shoot	Blue Square
Twinkle Bowl	Blue Square
Twinkle Toes	Green Circle
Upper Gully	Blue Square
Upper Sidewinder	Green Circle
Which Way	Double Black Diamond
Whitefang	Bob's Your Uncle
Yodellin	Blue Square

== Gallery ==
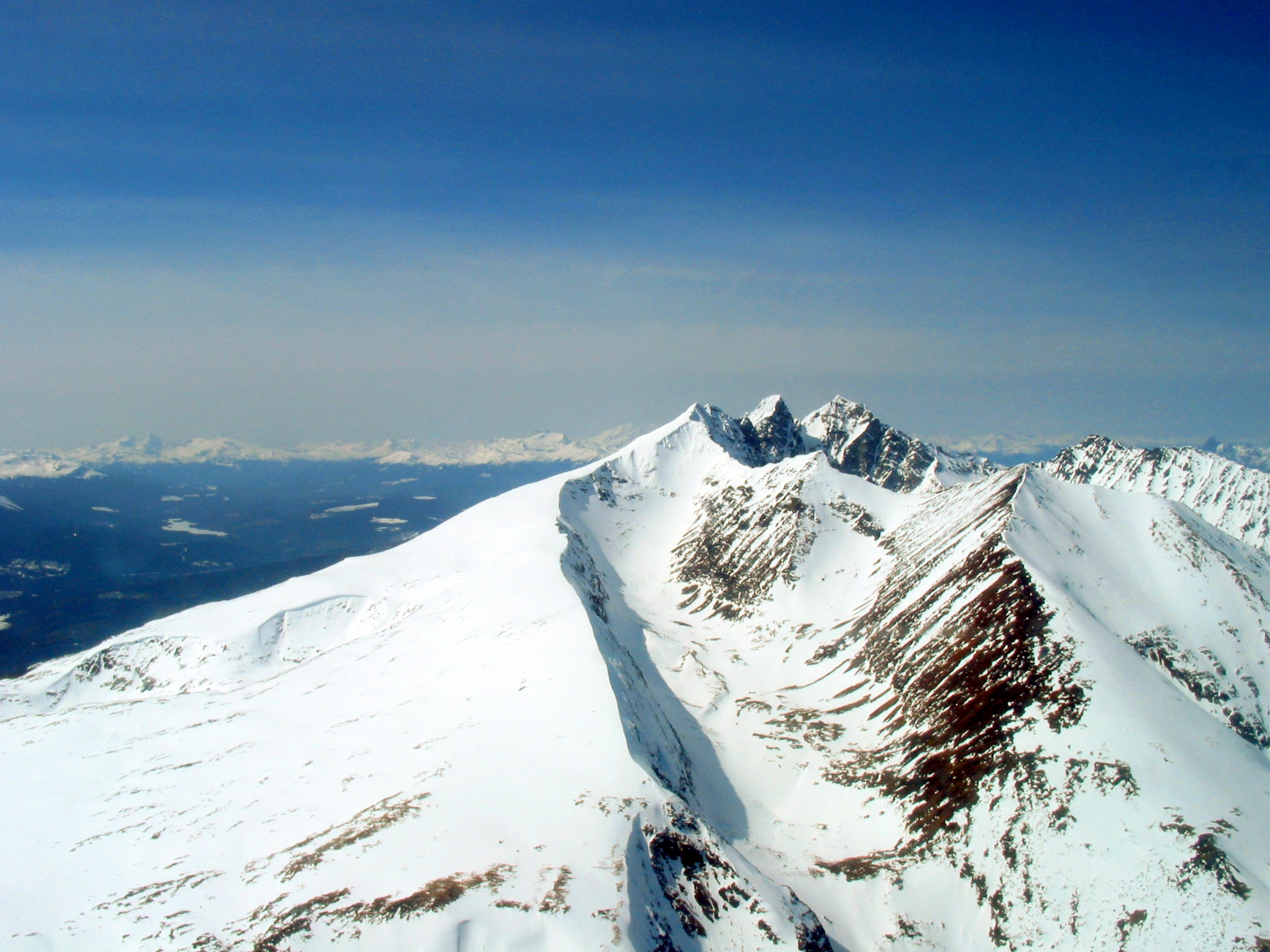
Hudson Bay Mountain

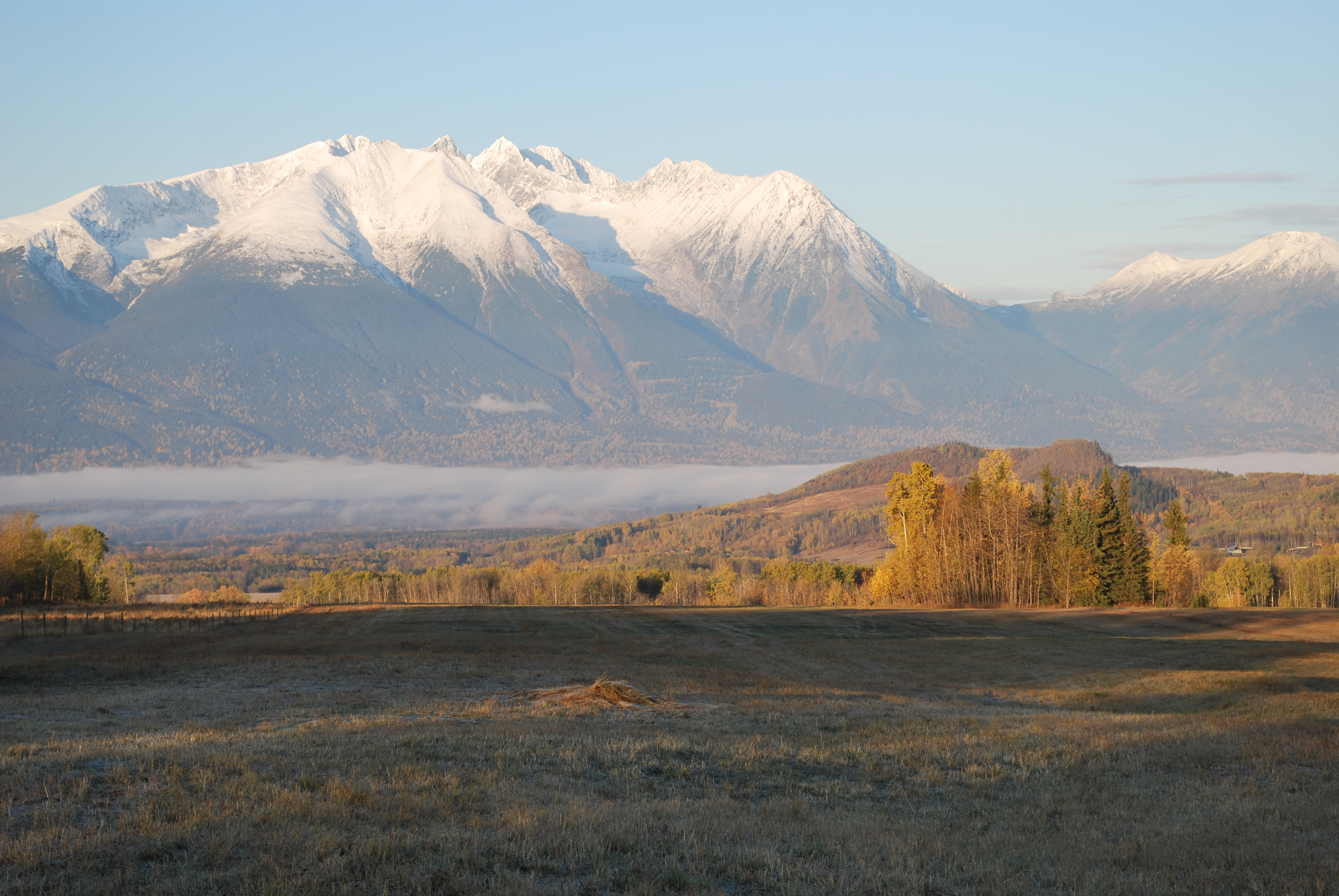
Hudson Bay Mountain
