= Shives (surname) =

Shives is a surname. Notable people with the surname include:

- Andrew Shives, American musician
- Arnold Shives (born 1943), Canadian artist
