= Hagwilget Peak =

Mountain in British Columbia, Canada

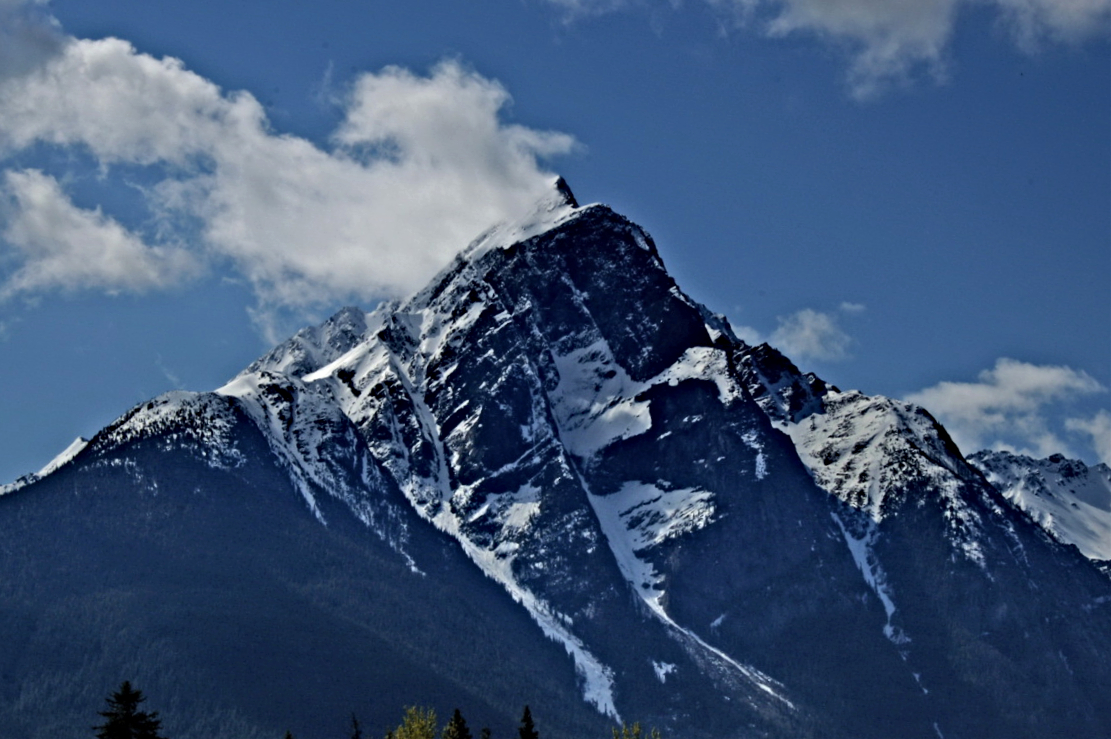
- Hagwilget Peak

Highest point
- Elevation: 2,076 m (6,811 ft)
- Prominence: 151 m (495 ft)
- Listing: Mountains of British Columbia
- Coordinates: 55°11′54″N 127°36′04″W

Geography
- Location within British Columbia Location within Canada
- Interactive map of Hagwilget Peak
- Location: British Columbia, Canada
- District: Cassiar Land District
- Parent range: Rocher Déboulé Range; Hazelton Mountains; Interior Mountains
- Topo map: NTS 93M4 Skeena Crossing

Hagwilget Peak is the northernmost mountain in the Rocher Déboulé Range in northern British Columbia, Canada. The 2,076-metre (6,811-foot) mountain summit is conspicuously situated immediately south of Hazelton, British Columbia.

Overlooking New Hazelton, it rises 1,770 m (5,807 ft) above the surrounding valley. Precipitation runoff from the mountain drains into the Skeena River and Bulkley River. Based on the Köppen climate classification, Hagwilget Peak is located in a subarctic climate zone with cold, snowy winters, and mild summers. Temperatures can drop below −20 °C with wind chill factors below −30 °C.

== History ==
Originally labelled Nil-ke-auda on George Dawson's map for an 1879–80 report for the Geological Survey of Canada, it was later adopted as Awillgate Peak in 1917. The spelling changed to Hagwilget Peak on 1 February 1963, when officially adopted by the Geographical Names Board of Canada to conform with the modern spelling of the namesake village, Hagwilget.

== Gallery ==
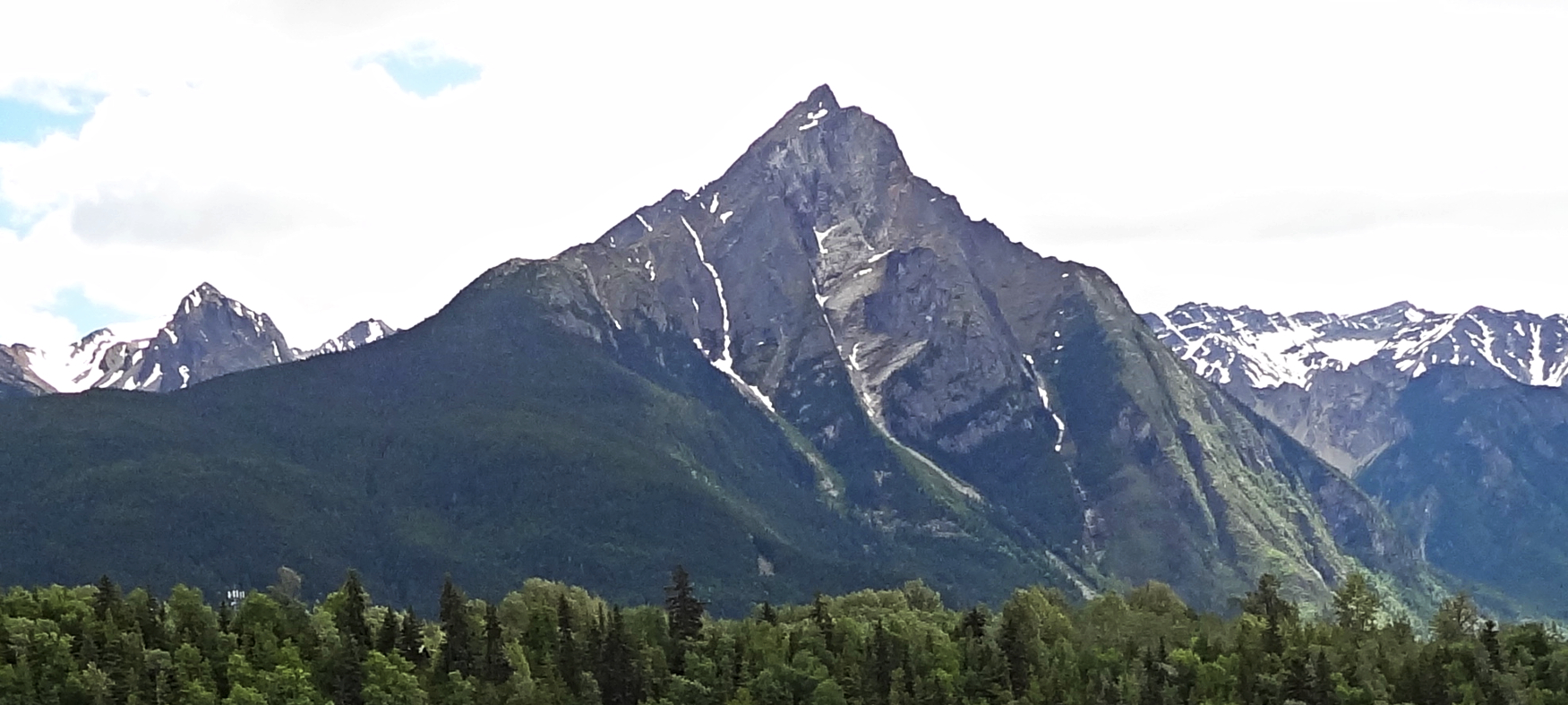
Hagwilget Peak

== See also ==
- Geography of British Columbia
