= Copper River =

Copper River may refer to several places:

- Copper River (Alaska), in the United States
- Copper River (British Columbia), a tributary of the Skeena River in Canada, now known as the Zymoetz River
- Copper River Census Area, a census area in the Unorganized Borough of Alaska
- Copper River Highway, Alaska
- Copper River and Northwestern Railway, a disused line in Alaska
