= Seven Sisters Provincial Park and Protected Area =

Provincial park in British Columbia, Canada

Seven Sisters Provincial Park
- IUCN category II (national park)
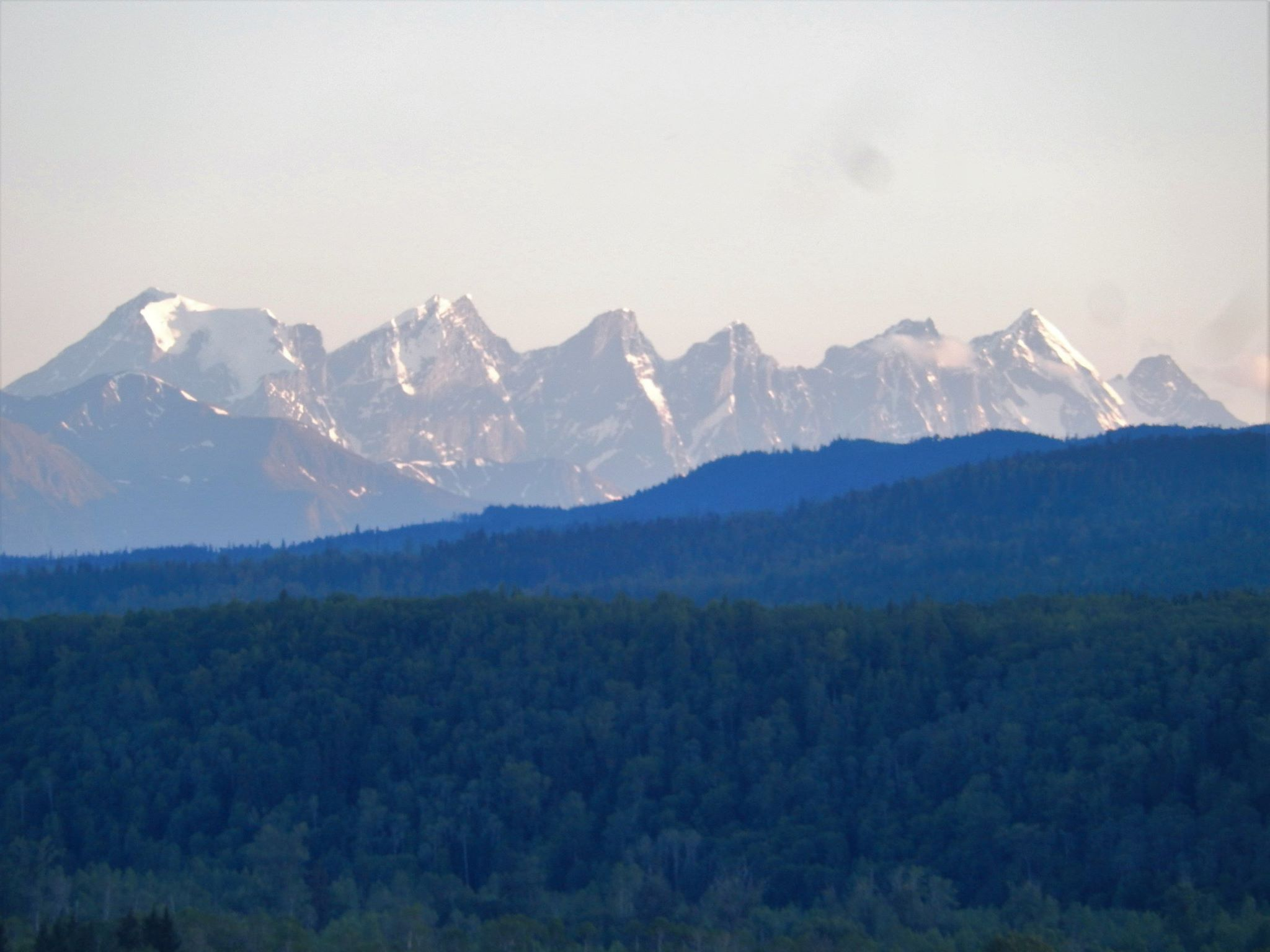
- Panoramic view

- Location within British Columbia
- Interactive map of Seven Sisters Provincial Park
- Location: British Columbia, Canada
- Nearest city: Hazelton
- Coordinates: 54°57′19″N 128°00′46″W
- Area: 272 km^{2} (105 sq mi)
- Established: June 29, 2000
- Governing body: BC Parks
- Website: bcparks.ca/seven-sisters-park/

Seven Sisters Provincial Park and Protected Area is a provincial park in British Columbia, Canada, protecting part of the Howson Range between Hazelton and Terrace and comprising approximately 27,200 hectares.

== See also ==
- Seven Sisters Peaks
- Orion Peak
