= Tahtsa Ranges =

Mountain range in British Columbia, Canada

- Location within British Columbia

Highest point
- Elevation: 1,051 m (3,448 ft)
- Coordinates: 53°45′00″N 127°30′00″W

Geography
- Country: Canada
- Province: British Columbia
- Parent range: Hazelton Mountains

The Tahtsa Ranges are a mountain range in northern British Columbia, Canada. It has an area of 7531 km^{2} and is a subrange of the Hazelton Mountains which in turn form part of the Interior Mountains. Their general location is between the eastern flank of the Kitimat Ranges of the Coast Mountains and the Nechako Reservoir (Ootsa Lake).

== Sub-ranges ==
- Chikamin Range
- Kasalka Range
- Morice Range
- Sibola Range
- Tochquonyalla Range
- Whitesail Range

== See also ==
- List of mountain ranges
