= George Pattullo =

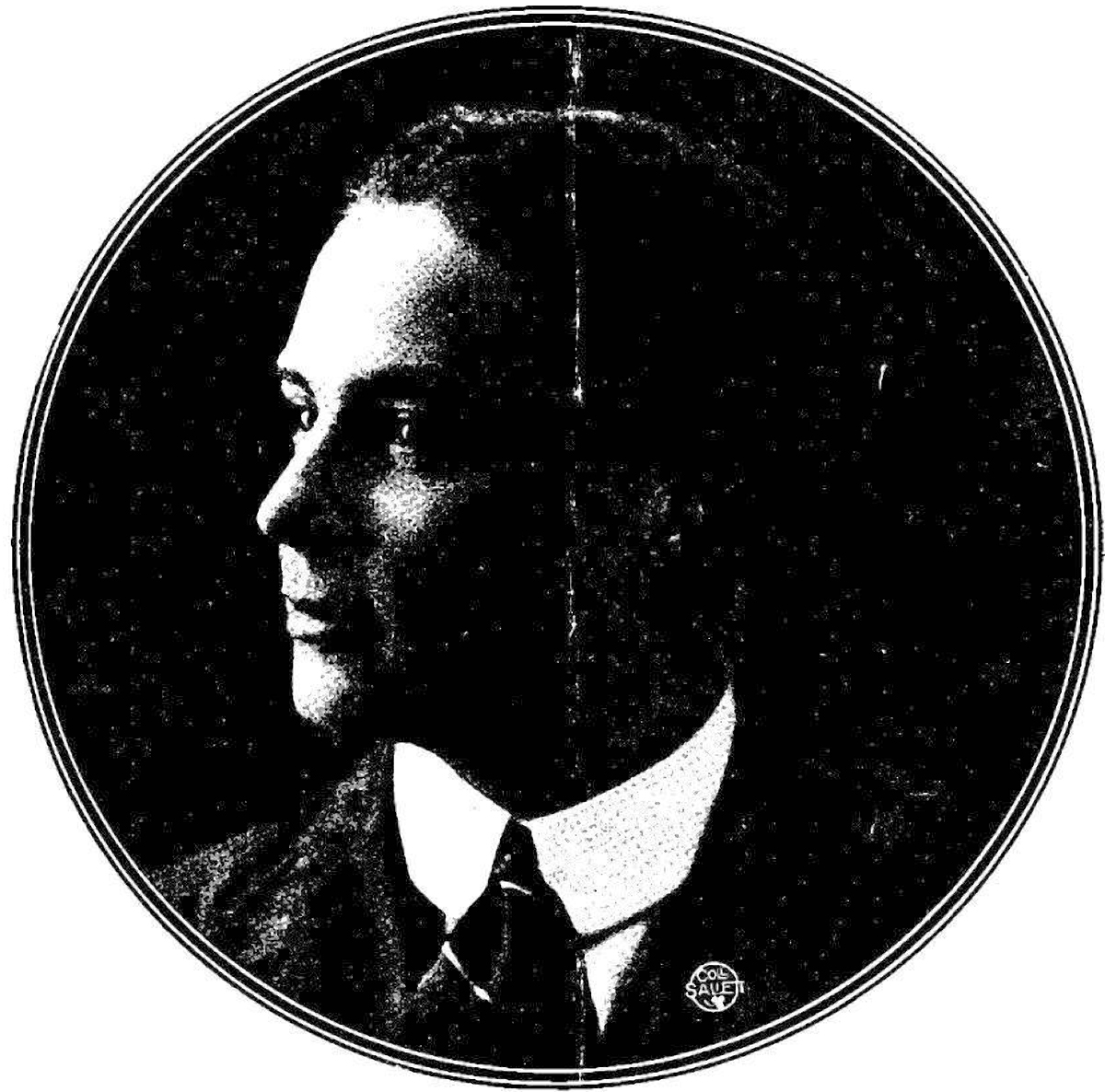
George Pattullo

George Pattullo is the name of:

- George Pattullo (footballer) (1888–1953), Scottish footballer for FC Barcelona
- George Pattullo (rugby union) (c. 1893/1894–1968), Scottish rugby union player
- George Pattullo (writer) (1879–1967), Canadian writer
