= Morice Range =

Mountain range in British Columbia, Canada

- Location within British Columbia

Highest point
- Elevation: 1,794 m (5,886 ft)

Geography
- Country: Canada
- Province: British Columbia
- Range coordinates: 54°40′N 127°40′W
- Parent range: Tahtsa Ranges

The Morice Range is a subrange of the Tahtsa Ranges, located on the west side of Morice Lake in northern British Columbia, Canada.
