= Whitesail Range =

Mountain range in British Columbia, Canada

Coordinates: 53°37′05″N 127°02′00″W

- Location within British Columbia

Highest point
- Elevation: 1,414 m (4,639 ft)

Geography
- Country: Canada
- Province: British Columbia
- Parent range: Tahtsa Ranges

The Whitesail Range is a subrange of the Tahtsa Ranges, located north of Whitesail River in northern British Columbia, Canada.
