= O.K. Range =

Mountain range in British Columbia, Canada

- Location within British Columbia

Highest point
- Coordinates: 54°31′N 128°15′W

Geography
- Country: Canada
- Region: British Columbia
- Parent range: Bulkley Ranges

The O.K. Range, also spelled OK Range, is a mountain range in northern British Columbia, Canada, located northeast of Terrace. It has an area of 347 km^{2} and is a subrange of the Bulkley Ranges which in turn form part of the Hazelton Mountains.

== See also ==
- List of mountain ranges
