= Tochquonyalla Range =

Mountain range in British Columbia, Canada

- Location within British Columbia

Geography
- Country: Canada
- Province: British Columbia
- Range coordinates: 53°19′N 127°21′W
- Parent range: Tahtsa Ranges

The Tochquonyalla Range is a subrange of the Tahtsa Ranges, located east of the Gamsby River and west of Lindquist Lake in northern British Columbia, Canada.
