= Telkwa Range =

Mountain range in British Columbia, Canada

Coordinates: 54°27′00″N 127°10′00″W

- Location within British Columbia

Geography
- Country: Canada
- Province: British Columbia
- Parent range: Bulkley Ranges

The Telkwa Range is a subrange of the Bulkley Ranges, located south of the junction of the Telkwa River and Bulkley River in northern British Columbia, Canada.
