= George Pattullo (rugby union) =

Scotland international rugby union player

George Leonard Shield Pattullo (c. 1893/1894 – 13 January 1968) was a Scottish rugby union player who represented Scotland at the 1920 Five Nations Championship.

Born in Colombo, he played the fullback position.
