= Ski Smithers =

Coordinates: 54.7728°N 127.2414°W

Hudson Bay Mountain Resort
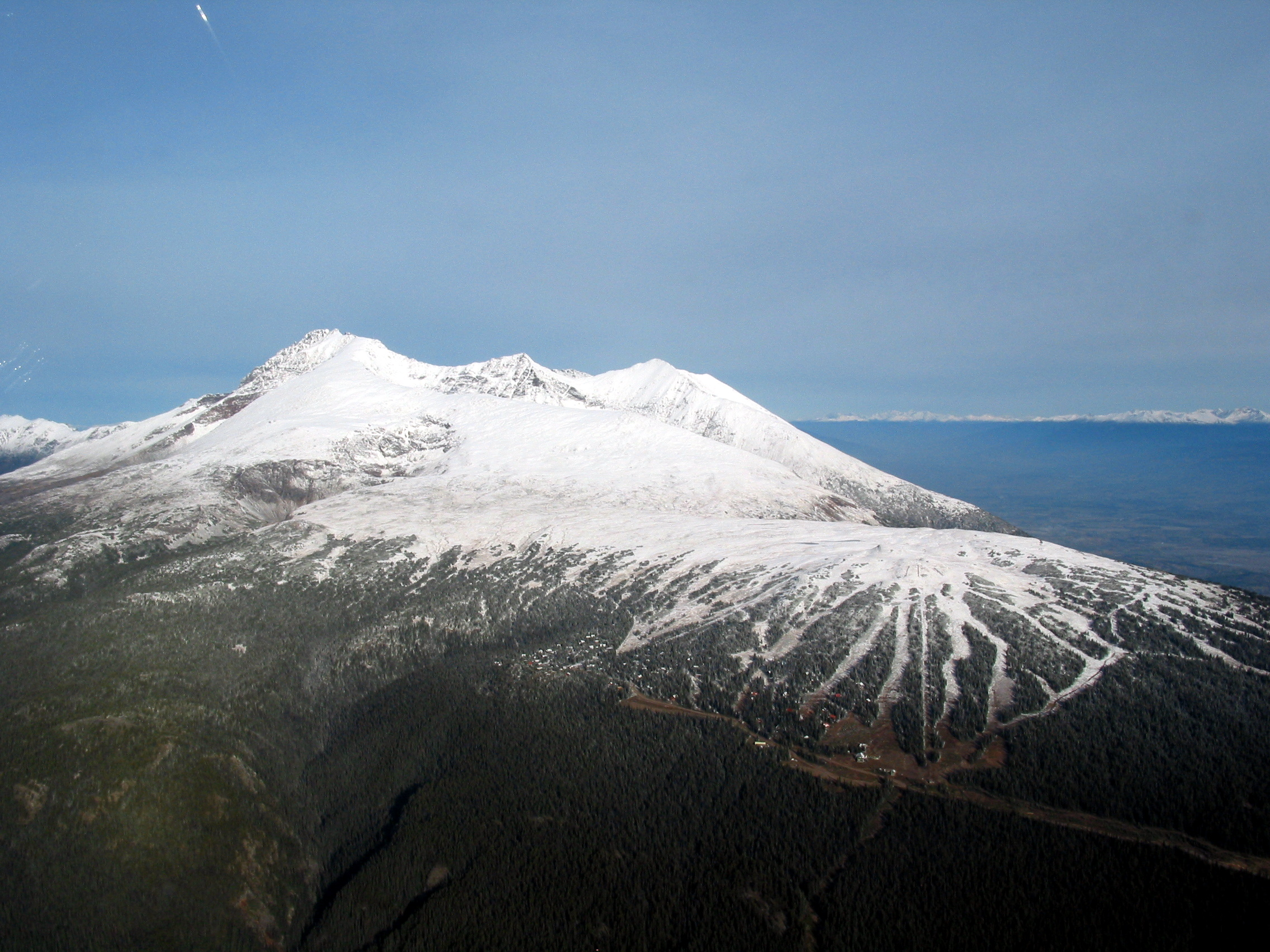
- Ski runs (bottom right) of Hudson Bay Mountain Resort
- Interactive map of Hudson Bay Mountain Resort
- Location: Smithers, British Columbia
- Trails: 36
- Lift system: 4

Hudson Bay Mountain Resort is a ski area just outside Smithers, British Columbia on the west side of the city, located on the mountain of the same name. The largest of only a few ski areas in northwestern British Columbia, and the only to qualify as a "resort", the ski area does not experience the rain-outs common in more coastal resorts such as Whistler or Mount Washington.
