= Kasalka Range =

Mountain range in British Columbia, Canada

- Location within British Columbia

Highest point
- Elevation: 1,608 m (5,276 ft)

Geography
- Country: Canada
- Province: British Columbia
- Range coordinates: 53°36′N 127°27′W
- Parent range: Tahtsa Ranges

The Kasalka Range is a subrange of the Tahtsa Ranges, located between Tahtsa Lake and Troitsa Lake in northern British Columbia, Canada.
