= Rocher Déboulé Range =

Subrange of the Bulkley Ranges

- Location within British Columbia

Highest point
- Coordinates: 55°07′15″N 127°34′30″W

Geography
- Country: Canada
- Province: British Columbia
- Parent range: Bulkley Ranges

The Rocher Déboulé Range, formerly known as the Roche Déboulé Mountains, is a subrange of the Bulkley Ranges, located south of Hazelton in northern British Columbia, Canada.

== See also ==
- Hagwilget Peak
