= Chikamin Range =

Mountain subrange in British Columbia, Canada

- Location within British Columbia

Geography
- Country: Canada
- Province: British Columbia
- Range coordinates: 53°24′N 127°05′W
- Parent range: Tahtsa Ranges

The Chikamin Range is a subrange of the Tahtsa Ranges, located between the west end of Eutsuk Lake and Whitesail Lake in northern British Columbia, Canada.
