= Sibola Range =

Mountain range in British Columbia, Canada

- Location within British Columbia

Highest point
- Elevation: 1,777 m (5,830 ft)

Geography
- Country: Canada
- Province: British Columbia
- Range coordinates: 53°47′N 127°20′W
- Parent range: Tahtsa Ranges

The Sibola Range is a subrange of the Tahtsa Ranges, located north of Tahtsa Lake in northern British Columbia, Canada.
