= Pattullo Range =

Mountain range in British Columbia, Canada

Coordinates: 52°58′55″N 126°33′56″W

- Location within British Columbia

Highest point

Geography
- Country: Canada
- Province: British Columbia
- Parent range: Hazelton Mountains

The Pattullo Range is a subrange of the Hazelton Mountains, located south of Tesla Lake and northeast of Bella Coola in northern British Columbia, Canada. Its highest summit is Tsaydaychuz Peak, 2758 m (9049 feet).

== Name origin ==
The range was named for the Honourable Thomas Dufferin Pattullo, 22nd Premier of British Columbia, commemorating the Governor General's visit to Tweedsmuir Provincial Park in 1937, as invited by Mr Pattullo.
