= Howson Range =

Mountain range in British Columbia, Canada

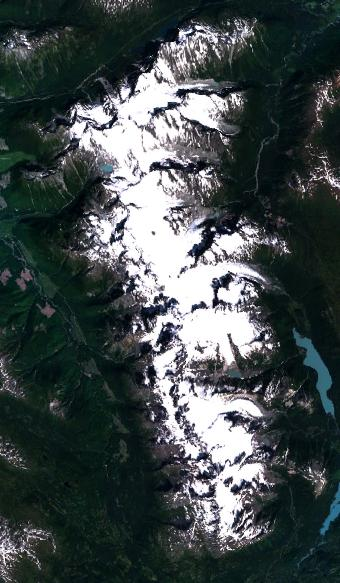
- Satellite image of the Howson Range

Highest point
- Peak: Howson Peak
- Elevation: 2,759 m (9,052 ft)
- Coordinates: 54°25′07.0″N 127°44′38.0″W

Geography
- Location within British Columbia
- Country: Canada
- Province: British Columbia
- Parent range: Bulkley Ranges, Hazelton Mountains

The Howson Range is a north–south trending subrange of the Bulkley Ranges of the Hazelton Mountains in northern British Columbia, Canada. It is located southwest of Telkwa Pass and southwest of Smithers. The highest summit in the range is Howson Peak 54 km (34 mi) southwest of Telkwa with an elevation of 2,759 m (9,052 ft).

== Mountains ==
Mountains in the Howson Range include:

- Howson Peak, 2,759 m (9,052 ft)
- Pyrite Peak, 2,466 m (8,091 ft)
- Redemption Peak, 2,592 m (8,504 ft)
- Preterition Peak, 2,623 m (8,606 ft)
- Tattered Tower, 2,225 m (7,300 ft)
- Outcast Peak, 2,435 m (7,989 ft)
- Mount Felber, 2,640 m (8,660 ft)
- Polemic Peak, 2,579 m (8,461 ft)
- Mount Desdemona, 2,574 m (8,445 ft)
- Tom Thumb Peak, 2,334 m (7,657 ft)
- Lonesome Crag, 2,389 m (7,838 ft)
- Barrel Sides Peak, 2,406 m (7,894 ft)
- Utica Peak, 2,095 m (6,873 ft)
- Loft Peak, 2,150 m (7,050 ft)
- Delta Peak, 2,360 m (7,740 ft)
- Gamma Peak, 2,400 m (7,900 ft)
- Mount Othello, 2,500 m (8,200 ft)
- Mount Cassio, 2,394 m (7,854 ft)
