= Arnold Shives =

Arnold Shives RCA (born December 27, 1943) is a Canadian multimedia artist and printmaker living in North Vancouver, British Columbia.

Shives was childhood friends with the concrete poet Barrie Phillip Nichol. Nichol's exchanges with Shives in life and letters offered a mutual exchange and "opportunities to explore or expand ideas".

== Education ==
In 1962, Shives entered the University of British Columbia where he audited painter Gordon A. Smith's art classes. This was followed by two years at the San Francisco Art Institute (1964–1966) where he studied painting with Julius Hatofsky and Richard Diebenkorn. In 1966 he won a Carnegie Corporation of New York Fellowship and entered the Graduate Program in Painting and Sculpture at Stanford University (MA 1969) and studied with Frank Lobdell and Nathan Oliveira and came in contact with Elmer Bischoff and Italian sculptor Arnaldo Pomadoro. As Edward Lucie-Smith, author of Art Today, wrote in his essay "Shives the Transcendentalist": "Shives was caught up in the radical climate of that time, but for him it triggered a spiritual quest - one that led him first to an exploration of the Eastern religions and philosophies then in vogue, and finally back to Christianity - specifically, in 1972, to Roman Catholicism." Not only this tendency but equally a spiritual search led Shives to learn of Saint Josemaria Escriva whose doctrines of freedom and understanding provided a point of reference for his visionary way of seeing nature, spirit and art. Art historian, curator and writer Edward Lucie-Smith sees this as a key to Shives' art stating, "His images are about freedom – the freedom not just to hike the mountains, but to be – by which I mean the freedom to exist in the natural world, in harmony with its age-old laws; the freedom to think; and the freedom to create in accordance with what both thought and emotion tell him."

== Work ==
After returning to Vancouver, B.C. in 1968, Shives continued painting. In 1973, he also began making prints. Mainly self-taught, Shives produced monochromatic relief and intaglio prints. Feeling the urgency to introduce colour, and influenced by jigsaw woodcut technique of Norwegian Edvard Munch, in 1975 he began creating large multi-colour block prints.

Throughout much of his career and during the print revival of the 1960s and 1970s, Shives achieved recognition as one of Canada's strongest graphic and print artists. Toni Onley commented: "Arnold is one of the most talented printmakers Canada has produced." For a show held at Calgary in 1984, in a Calgary Herald review Nancy Tousley wrote: "Shives is justly known for his accomplished, unusually large linocuts that recall the bold, decorative contemporary Japanese colour woodcut...The engagingly eccentric personal qualities of his work recall Milton Avery."

For another show at the California Palace of the Legion of Honor, San Francisco Chronicle critic Abby Wasserman wrote: "Shives has some of the power and poetry of the landscapes by the late Lawren Harris of Canada's famous Group of Seven."

Joan Murray commented in The Best of the Group of Seven: "(…) to younger painters, the Group of Seven seems removed from their own concerns. Only the painter and print-maker Arnold Shives in Vancouver has found their imagery in his work (often birches in snow)."

An ongoing member of the British Columbia Mountaineering Club, Shives has explored mountainous areas of British Columbia and made first ascents of mountains in the north Cascades, and northern B.C. It was this closeness to nature that made it the source for Shives' painting and printmaking. This has continued throughout his career, so much so that as an artist he participated in the Western Canada Wilderness Committee's campaigns to save the Carmannah Valley and the Stein Valley from logging. As literary critic and author, Trevor Carolan has written, "Thirty-five years into his vocation as a landscape-based painter, printmaker and sculptor, Vancouver's Arnold Shives still hears the Big Song in his walkabouts through British Columbia's backcountry... Currently working at the top of his creative form, at fifty-seven the introverted Canadian is secure in his place as one of the most ecologically attuned visual artists of his generation. It is not an achievement come lightly. In an easy, amoral age when the legitimacy of "risk" has become debased in our arts discourse as the adjective "legendary" has among rock journalists, Arnold Shives - painter, public individual, father of five, activist - puts it on the line for an etiquette of personal self-discipline, community harmony, and environmental responsibility."

== Exhibitions ==
Shives has held numerous exhibitions of his prints and paintings regionally and internationally, notably with the Pollock Gallery (1975) in Toronto and the Arnold Shives – Prints show held at the Art Gallery of Greater Victoria in 1983. In the Heart of the Wild, was held at the DeLeon White Gallery, in 1996 and at the Bond Gallery, Queensland, Australia in 2004. and they faded into the landscape was held at North Vancouver’s Seymour Art Gallery in 2018.

== Books and collaborations ==
In the tradition of Canada's Group of Seven, who worked at Grip, Brigdens and other Canadian commercial design and illustration firms, Shives has played a significant role as the producer of artist's books, notably Mountain Journal and At Stonehenge & Avebury, the latter, a collaboration with poet John K. Grande won a design award from the Alcuin Society in 2009. Shives' graphics and illustrations in books on mountaineering, on beat writer Jack Kerouac's west coast experience, in Thomas Merton and the Beats of the North Cascades explore the links between nature and culture. Over the years, Arnold Shives has produced and illustrated numerous artist's books.

== Public art collections ==
Shives' art is represented in the collections of the British Museum, National Gallery of Canada, the Burnaby Art Gallery, the Kelowna Art Gallery and many other public collections.

== Awards ==
Alternate Special Edition Purchase Award, San Francisco Art Institute, World Print Competition, 1976

In 1991 Arnold Shives won the District of North Vancouver Centennial Distinguished Citizens Award

Since 2005 he has been a member the Royal Canadian Academy of Arts
