= Bornite Range =

Mountain range in British Columbia, Canada

- Location within British Columbia

Geography
- Country: Canada
- Province: British Columbia
- Range coordinates: 54°36′N 128°15′W
- Parent range: Bulkley Ranges

The Bornite Range is a subrange of the Bulkley Ranges, located just northeast of Terrace on the north side of Kleanza Creek in northern British Columbia, Canada.

== Mountains ==
- Bornite Mountain

== See also ==
- Bornite
