= Bulkley Ranges =

Mountain range in British Columbia, Canada

- Location within British Columbia

Geography
- Country: Canada
- Province: British Columbia
- Range coordinates: 54°39′59″N 127°40′05″W
- Parent range: Hazelton Mountains

The Bulkley Ranges are a mountain range in northern British Columbia, Canada, located between the Skeena and Bulkley Rivers south of Hazelton, north of the Morice River and Zymoetz River. It has an area of 7851 km^{2} and is a subrange of the Hazelton Mountains which in turn form part of the Interior Mountains.

== Sub-ranges ==
- Bornite Range
- Howson Range
- O.K. Range
- Rocher Déboulé Range
- Telkwa Range

== See also ==
- List of mountain ranges
