= Howson Peak =

Mountain in British Columbia, Canada

- Location within British Columbia
- Interactive map of Howson Peak

Highest point
- Elevation: 2,759 m (9,052 ft)
- Prominence: 1,829 m (6,001 ft)
- Listing: Mountains of British Columbia; North America isolated peaks 80th; Canada highest major peaks 88th; Canada prominent peaks 55th; Canada most isolated peaks 24th
- Coordinates: 54°25′06″N 127°44′38″W

Geography
- Location: British Columbia, Canada
- District: Range 5 Coast Land District
- Parent range: Howson Range
- Topo map: NTS 93L5 Burnie Lake

Climbing
- First ascent: 1958
- Easiest route: N Ridge

Howson Peak is a mountain in west central British Columbia, Canada, located 54 km (34 mi) southwest of Telkwa, southwest of the head of Telkwa River, and near the Burnie River and Kitnayakwa River tributaries of the Zymoetz River. This prominent mountain is the highest of the Howson Range. Howson Peak was first climbed in 1958 after an accident during a 1957 attempt in which Rex Gibson, then president of the Alpine Club of Canada, was killed. That route, as well as many other lines, remains unclimbed. The mountain is now in Tazdli Wiyez Bin or Burnie-Shea Provincial Park. Access is by air to Burnie Lake or on foot from the Kitnayakwa River road. The Burnie Glacier Chalet is the nearest accommodation.

== See also ==
- List of Ultras of North America

== Sources ==
- "Howson Peak". Bivouac.com.
- Canadian Alpine Journal 1957 and 1958
- "Howson Peak, British Columbia". Peakbagger.com.
