= Unincorporated settlements on Vancouver Island, British Columbia =

== Major regions of Vancouver Island, BC ==
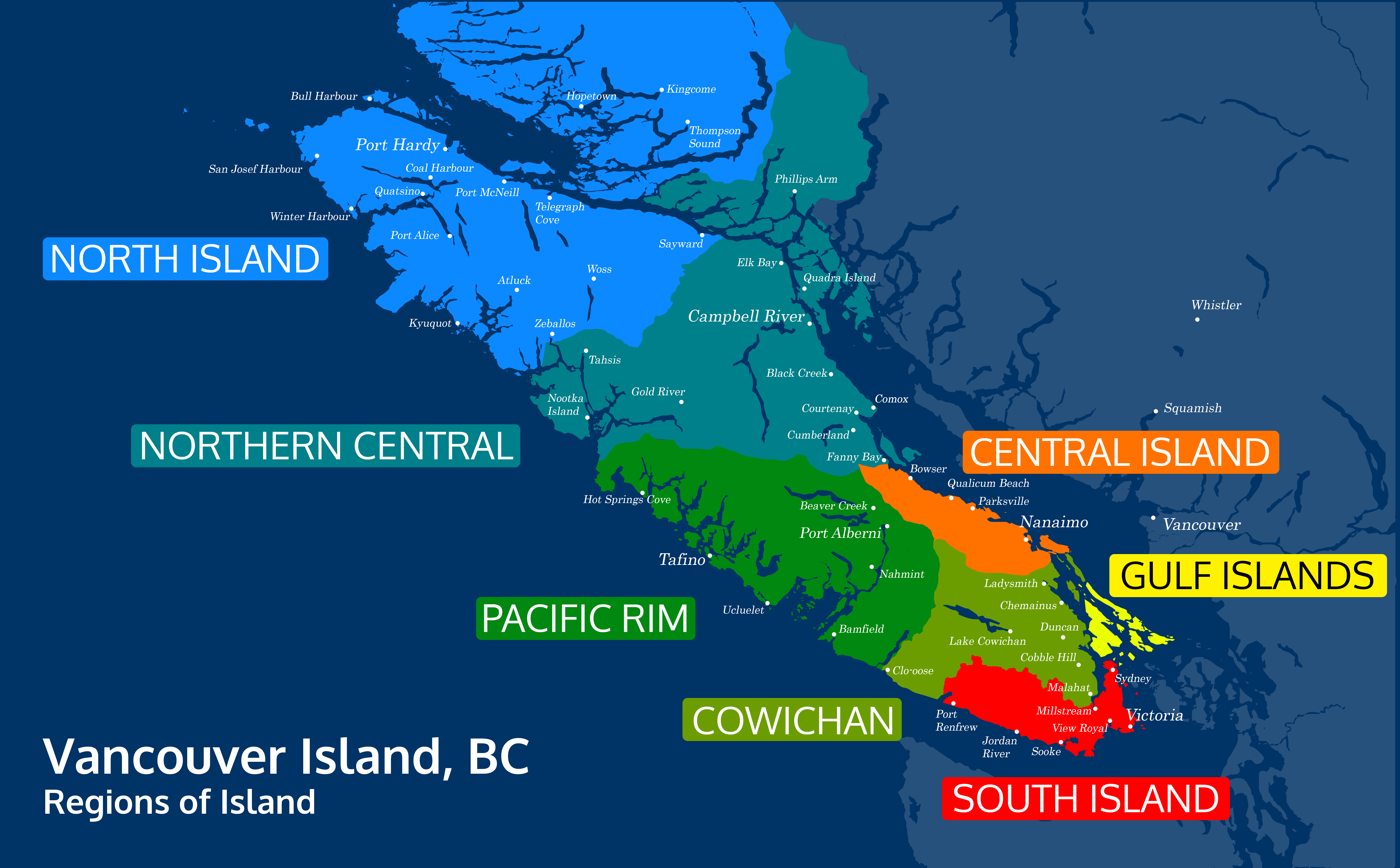

== Unincorporated Settlements and Townships ==
Settlement/Township Name	Region of Island
Bainbridge	Pacific Rim
Bamberton	South Island
Bamfield	Pacific Rim
Beaver Cove	North Island
Beaver Creek	Pacific Rim
Black Creek	Northern Central
Blubber Bay	Northern Central
Buckley Bay	Northern Central
Cassidy	Central Island
Cedar	Central Island
Clayoquot	Pacific Rim
Clo-oose	Cowichan
Coal Harbour (Vancouver Island)	North Island
Cobble Hill	Cowichan
Coombs	Central Island
Deep Bay	Central Island
Denman Island	Northern Central
East Sooke	South Island
Englewood	North Island
Fanny Bay	Northern Central
Fulford Harbour	Gulf Islands
Ganges	Gulf Islands
Goldstream	South Island
Happy Valley	South Island
Holberg	North Island
Honeymoon Bay	Cowichan
Hot Springs Cove	Pacific Rim
Jordan River	South Island
Kildonan	Pacific Rim
Kokish	North Island
Kyuquot	North Island
Lasqueti Island	Central Island
Little River	Northern Central
Long Harbour	Gulf Islands
Malahat	Cowichan
Mayne Island	Gulf Islands
Merville	Northern Central
Mesachie Lake	Cowichan
Mill Bay	Cowichan
Nanoose Bay	Central Island
Oyster River	Northern Central
Poett Nook	Pacific Rim
Port Renfrew	South Island
Quadra Island	Northern Central
Quatsino	North Island
Ronning Gardens	North Island
Royston	Northern Central
Saturna Island	Gulf Islands
Shawnigan Lake	Cowichan
Shushartie	North Island
Sointula	North Island
Sturdies Bay	Gulf Island
Telegraph Cove	North Island
Thetis Island	Gulf Island
Union Bay	Northern Central
Valdes Island	Gulf Island
Van Anda	Central Island
Vesuvius	Gulf Island
Westholme	Cowichan
Winter Harbour	North Island
Woss	North Island
Youbou	Cowichan

== See also ==
- List of communities in British Columbia (All unincorporated communities across British Columbia listed)
- Unincorporated Areas and Settlements (Wiki article explainer)
