= Woss (disambiguation) =

Woss is a village in British Columbia, Canada.

Woss, Wöss or WOSS may also refer to:

== People ==
- Alejandro Woss y Gil (1856–1932), Dominican Republic politician and military figure
- Celeste Woss y Gil (1891–1985), Dominican Republic painter, educator, and feminist activist
- Josef Venantius von Wöss (1863–1943), Austrian composer and teacher
- Kurt Wöss (1914–1987), Austrian conductor and musicologist
- Nelson Woss, Australian film producer
- Richard Wöss (born 1986), Austrian handball player

== Places ==
- White Oaks Secondary School, Oakville, Ontario, Canada
- Woss Lake Provincial Park, British Columbia, Canada
- Woss Mountain, British Columbia, Canada

== Other ==
- Franz Wöss Racing, Austrian motor racing team
- WOSS, radio station in New York, United States

== See also ==
- Elisabeth Tschermak-Woess, Austrian cytologist and phycologist
- Wossy
