= Inglewood =

The name Inglewood originally traces back to Inglewood Forest. Despite the similarity in the name and original meaning, the name is not related to Englewood. Today, the name may refer to:

== Places ==
=== Australia ===
- Inglewood, Queensland
- Shire of Inglewood, Queensland, a former local government area
- Inglewood, South Australia
- Inglewood, Victoria
- Inglewood, Western Australia

=== Canada ===
- Inglewood, Ontario
- Inglewood, Calgary
- Inglewood, Edmonton

=== New Zealand ===
- Inglewood, New Zealand

=== South Africa ===
- Inglewood, South Africa

=== United Kingdom ===
- Inglewood, Cheshire, a house
- Inglewood Forest, Cumberland
- Inglewood Children's Home In Otley

=== United States ===
- Inglewood, California
- Inglewood, Nebraska
- Inglewood, Mecklenburg County, Virginia
- Inglewood, Rockingham County, Virginia
- Inglewood (Glasgow, Missouri), a historic house
- Inglewood (Harrisonburg, Virginia), a historic house
- Inglewood-Finn Hill, Washington, a census-designated place

== People ==
- Baron Inglewood

== See also ==
- Englewood
