= Beaver Cove =

Beaver Cove may refer to:

- Beaver Cove, Maine, U.S.
- Beaver Cove (British Columbia), a cove on Vancouver Island, Canada
  - Beaver Cove, British Columbia, a community on the cove of the same name
- Beaver Cove, Nova Scotia, Canada
- Beaver Cove, Newfoundland and Labrador, Canada, the name of several places

== See also ==
- Beaver Harbour (disambiguation)
