= Train Protection & Warning System =

Train protection system in the UK and Victoria, Australia

The Train Protection & Warning System (TPWS) is a train protection system used throughout the British passenger main-line railway network, and in Victoria, Australia.

According to the UK Rail Safety and Standards Board, the purpose of TPWS is to stop a train by automatically initiating a brake demand, where TPWS track equipment is fitted, if the train has: passed a signal at danger without authority; approached a signal at danger too fast; approached a reduction in permissible speed too fast; approached buffer stops too fast. TPWS is not designed to prevent signals passed at danger (SPADs) but to mitigate the consequences of a SPAD, by preventing a train that has had a SPAD from reaching a conflict point after the signal.

A standard installation consists of an on-track transmitter adjacent to a signal, activated when the signal is at danger. A train that passes the signal will have its emergency brake activated. If the train is travelling at speed, this may be too late to stop it before the point of collision, therefore a second transmitter may be placed on the approach to the signal that applies the brakes on trains going too quickly to stop at the signal, positioned to stop trains approaching at up to 75 mph (120 km/h).

At around 400 high-risk locations, TPWS+ is installed with a third transmitter further in rear of the signal increasing the effectiveness to 100 mph (160 km/h). When installed in conjunction with signal controls such as 'double blocking' (i.e. two red signal aspects in succession), TPWS can be fully effective at any realistic speed.

TPWS is not the same as train stops which accomplish a similar task using electro-mechanical technology. Buffer stop protection using train stops is known as ‘Moorgate protection' or 'Moorgate control’.

== History ==
TPWS was developed by British Rail and its successor Railtrack, following a determination in 1994 that British Rail's Automatic Train Protection system was not economical – ATP would cost £600 million (equivalent to £1.2 billion in 2024) to implement, compared to value in lives saved: £3 – £4 million (£6 – 8 million in 2024), per life saved, which was estimated to be 2.9 per year.

Trial installations of track side and train mounted equipment were made in 1997, with trials and development continuing over the next two years.

The rollout of TPWS accelerated when the Railway Safety Regulations 1999 came into force in 2003, requiring the installation of train stops at a number of types of location. However, in March 2001 the Joint Inquiry Into Train Protection Systems report found that TPWS had a number of limitations, and that while it provided a relatively cheap stop-gap prior to the widescale introduction of ATP and ERTMS, nothing should impede the installation of the much more capable European Train Control System.

== How it works ==
=== Overview ===
A pair of electronic loops are placed 50–450 metres on the approach side of the signal, energized when it is at danger. The distance between the loops determines the minimum speed at which the on board equipment will apply the train's emergency brake. When the train's TPWS receiver passes over the first loop a timer begins to count down. If the second loop is passed before the timer has reached zero, the TPWS will activate. The greater the line speed, the more widely spaced the two loops will be.

There is another pair of loops at the signal, also energised when the signal is at danger. These are end to end, and thus will initiate a brake application on a train about to pass a signal at danger regardless of speed.

=== On-track equipment ===
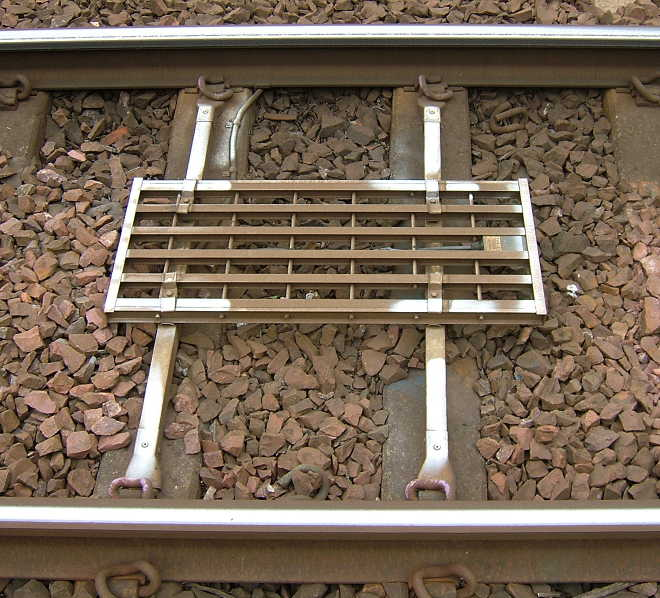
A TPWS transmitter loop ("grid"), one of a pair that form an Overspeed Sensor System (OSS)

In a standard installation there are two pairs of loops, colloquially referred to as "grids" or "toast racks". Both pairs consist of an 'arming' and a 'trigger' loop. If the signal is at danger the loops will be energised. If the signal is clear, the loops will de-energise.

The first pair, the Overspeed Sensor System (OSS), is sited at a position determined by line speed and gradient. The loops are separated by a distance that should not be traversed within less than a pre-determined period of time of about one second if the train is running at a safe speed approaching the signal at danger. The exact timings are 974 milliseconds for passenger trains and 1218 milliseconds for freight trains, determined by equipment on the train. Freight trains use the 1.25 times longer timing because of their different braking characteristics.

The first, 'arming', loop emits a frequency of 64.25 kHz. The second, 'trigger', loop has a frequency of 65.25 kHz.

The other pair of loops is back to back at the signal, and is called a Train Stop System (TSS). The 'arming' and 'trigger' loops work at 66.25 kHz and 65.25 kHz respectively. The brakes will be applied if the on-train equipment detects both frequencies together after having detected the arming frequency alone. Thus, an energised TSS is effective at any speed, but only if a train passes it in the right direction. Since a train may be required to pass a signal at danger during failure etc., the driver has the option to override a TSS, but not an OSS.

When a subsidiary signal associated with a main aspect signal is cleared for a shunting movement, the TSS loops are de-energised, but the OSS loops remain active.

Where trains are signalled in opposite directions on an individual line it could be possible for an unwarranted TPWS intervention to occur as a train travelled between an OSS arming and either trigger loops that were in fact associated with different signals. To cater for this situation one signal would be nominated the ‘normal direction’ and fitted with ‘ND’ equipment. The other signal would be nominated the ‘opposite direction’ and fitted with ‘OD’ equipment. Opposite direction TPWS transmission frequencies are slightly different, working at 64.75 (OSS arming), 66.75 (TSS arming), and 65.75 kHz (common trigger).

=== Location equipment ===
At the lineside there are two modules associated with each set of loops: a Signal Interface Module (SIM) and an OSS or TSS module. These generate the frequencies for the loops, and prove the loops are intact. They interface with the signalling system.

SIM Modules are colour coded red

ND TSS Modules are colour coded green

OD TSS Modules are colour coded brown

ND OSS Modules are colour coded yellow

OD OSS Modules are colour coded blue

=== On-train equipment ===
Every traction unit is fitted with a:

- TPWS receiver.
- TPWS control panel (standard or enhanced version).
- AWS/TPWS acknowledgement button.
- TPWS temporary isolation switch.
- AWS/TPWS full isolation switch.

If the loops are energised, an aerial on the underside of the train picks up the radio frequency signal and passes it to the receiver. A timer measures how long it takes to pass between the arming and trigger loops. This time is used to check the speed, and if it is higher than the TPWS 'set speed', an emergency brake application is initiated. If the train is travelling slower than the TPWS set speed, but then passes the signal at danger, the aerial will receive the signal from the energised Train Stop System loops, and the brake will be applied to stop the train within the overlap. Multiple unit trains have an aerial at each end. Vehicles that can operate singly (single car DMUs and locomotives) only have one aerial. This would be either at the front or rear of it depending on the direction the vehicle was moving in.

=== In-cab equipment ===
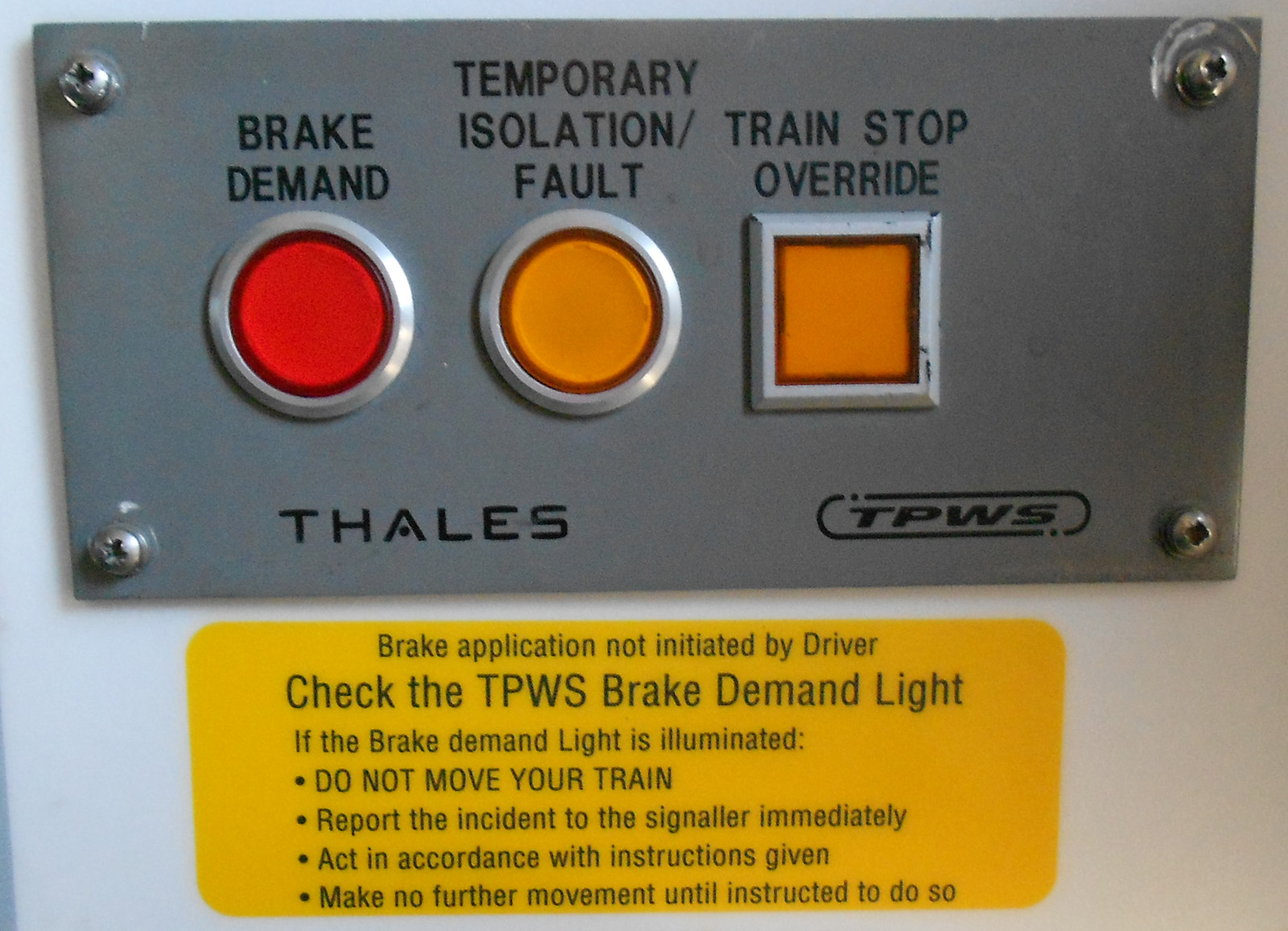
'Standard' TPWS panel in driving cab

Every driving cab has a TPWS control panel, located where the driver can see it from their desk. There are two types of panel; the original 'standard' type, and a more recent 'enhanced' version, which gives separate indications for a brake demand caused by a SPAD, Overspeed or AWS.

The standard type consists of two circular indicator lamps and a square push button.

The push switch marked "Train Stop Override" is used to pass a signal at danger with authority. It ignores the TPWS TSS loops for approximately 20 seconds (generally for passenger trains) or 60 seconds (generally for slower accelerating freight trains) or until the loops have been passed, whichever is sooner.

The AWS system and the TPWS system are inter-linked and if either of these has initiated a brake application, the "Brake Demand" indicator lamp will flash.

The "Temporary Isolation/Fault" indicator lamp will flash if there is a TPWS system fault, or will show a steady illumination if the "Temporary Isolation Switch" has been activated.

There is also a separate TPWS Temporary Isolation Switch located out of reach of the driver's desk. This is operated by the driver when the train is being worked in degraded conditions such as Temporary Block Working where multiple signals need to be passed at danger with the signaller's authority. Temporarily isolating the TPWS does not affect the AWS. The driver must reinstate the TPWS immediately at the point where normal working is resumed. As a safety feature, if they forget to do this, the TPWS will be reinstated on the next occasion that the driver's desk is shut down and then opened up again.

=== TPWS use in depot personnel safety ===
An alternative to using derailers in Depot Personnel Protection Systems is to equip the system with TPWS. This equipment safeguards staff from unauthorised movements by using the TPWS equipment. Any unplanned movement will cause the train to automatically come to a stand when it has passed the relevant signal set at danger. This has the added benefit of preventing damage to the infrastructure and traction and rolling stock that a derailer system can cause. The first known installation of such a system is at Ilford Depot. TPWS equipped depot protection systems are suitable only for locations where vehicles are driven in and out of the maintenance building from a leading driving cab - they are not suitable for use with loose coaching stock or wagon maintenance, where vehicle movements are undertaken by a propelling shunting loco (in this case the lead vehicles would not be equipped with the relevant TPWS safety equipment), nor will it prevent a run-away vehicle from entering a protected work area.

=== Variations ===
Certain signals may have multiple OSSes fitted. Alternatively, usually due to low line speeds, an OSS may not be fitted. An example of this is a terminal station platform starting signal. An OSS on its own may be used to protect a permanent speed restriction, or buffer stop. Although loops are standard, buffer stops may be fitted with 'mini loops', due to the very low approach speed, usually 10 mph. When buffer stops were originally fitted with TPWS using standard loops there were many instances of false applications, causing delays whilst it reset, with trains potentially blocking the station throat, plus the risk of passengers standing to alight being thrown over by the sudden braking. This problem arose when a train passed over the arming loop so slowly that it was still detected by the train's receiver after the on-board timer had completed its cycle. The timer would reset and begin timing again, and the trigger loop then being detected within this second timing cycle would lead to a false intervention. As a temporary solution, drivers were instructed to pass the buffer stop OSSs at 5 mph, eliminating the problem, but meaning that trains no longer had the momentum to roll to the normal stopping point and requiring drivers to apply power beyond the OSS, just a short distance from the buffers, arguably making a buffer stop collision more likely than before TPWS was fitted. The redesigned 'mini loops', roughly a third the length of the standard ones, eliminate this problem, although due to the low speed and low margin, buffer stop OSSs are still a major cause of TPWS trips.

Recent applications in the UK have, in conjunction with advanced SPAD protection techniques, used TPWS with outer home signals that protect converging junctions with a higher than average risk by controlling the speed of an approaching train an extra signal section in rear of the junction. If this fails the resultant TPWS application of brakes will stop the train before the point of conflict is reached. This system is referred to as TPWS OS (Outer Signal).

In the Victorian installation, which intergrates with speed based signalling, the OSSs are used for enforcement of the Medium speed aspects in addition to stop signals, by having additional loops for Medium speed that are not armed when the signal shows Normal speed.

== Limitations ==
=== Speed ===
Standard TPWS installations can only bring a train to a stop prior to passing a red signal, at 74 miles per hour (119 km/h). In 2001, it was observed that roughly one-third of the UK railway allows for a speed above 75 miles per hour (121 km/h). Further this assumes the train's brakes is capable of providing a brake force of 12%g. (Note: Braking capability is "conventionally measured as a percentage of “reverse acceleration” represented by gravity (g)." In 2001, the best braking available was "enhanced emergency" braking" producing a braking force equivalent to 12%g.) A number of train types, most notably, the HSTs were not capable of achieving this, despite having a top speed of 125 miles per hour (201 km/h). TPWS-A was capable of stopping a train up to 100 miles per hour (160 km/h).

=== Signals passed at danger with permission ===
TPWS has no ability to regulate speed after a train passes a signal at danger with authority. However, on those occasions there are strict rules governing the actions of drivers, train speed, and the use of TPWS.

There are many reasons why a driver might be required to pass a signal at danger with authority. The signaller will advise the driver to pass the signal at danger, proceed with caution, be prepared to stop short of any obstruction, and then obey all other signals. Immediately before moving, the driver will press the "Trainstop Override" button on the TPWS panel, so that the train can pass the signal without triggering the TPWS to apply the brakes.

The driver must then proceed at a speed which enables them to stop within the distance that they can see to be clear. Even if it appears that the section is clear to the next signal, they must still exercise caution.

=== Track conditions ===
TPWS failed to prevent the 2021 Salisbury rail crash, because although the train went to full emergency braking, the slick conditions produced wheel slide and the train therefore was not brought to a stop prior to the collision point. (ATP would not have prevented this circumstance either).

=== Compared with other safety systems ===
Critics, such as those representing victims of the Ladbroke Grove and Southall rail crashes, and ASLEF and RMT rail unions pushed for the abandonment of TPWS in the late 1990s in favor of continuing with British Rail's ATP project.

A 2000 study, Automatic Train Protection for the rail network in Britain remarked that TPWS was "in terms of avoiding “ATP preventable accidents” it is about 70% effective.", highlighting the speed limitation. That 2000 study did still conclude that TPWS was good solution for the short term of 10–15 years, but stressed that European Train Control system was the long term solution.

Notably, the combination of TPWS and AWS is least effective in accidents like the one at Purley, where a driver repeatedly cancelled the AWS warning without applying the brakes, passing the danger signal at high speed. Purley was one of several high profile SPAD crashes in the late 1980s, that led to the initial plan in the 1990s for the mass rollout of ATP, that was subsequently canceled in 1994 to be replaced by TPWS.

Supporters of TPWS claim that even where it could not prevent accidents due to SPADs, it would likely reduce the impact, and reduce or eliminate fatalities, by at least slowing the train down. However, it is likely that in those cases the driver would have applied the emergency brakes well before the overspeed sensor.

It has been noted that there have been very few fatalities since the fitting of TPWS that would have been prevented had ATP been fitted instead. However, this overlooks that during the delay between the decision to cancel ATP and replace it with TPWS and the actual roll out of TPWS, the Ladbroke Grove and Southall rail crashes both occurred. These accidents were ATP preventable, and occurred on the Great Western line, which had been outfitted with ATP as part of the pilot studies in the early-1990s.

== Locations in use ==
The TPWS system is used in:

- The United Kingdom, with AWS magnets and with short overlaps
- Victoria, Australia, without AWS magnets and with full-length overlaps

Since 1996, an older variant of TPWS, called the Auxiliary Warning System, has been used by the Mumbai Suburban Railway in India, on the Western Line and Central Line.

== See also ==
- Automatic Warning System – a British Rail-developed warning system used alongside TPWS
