= Marine mammals of the Salish Sea =

Sea between British Columbia and Washington State

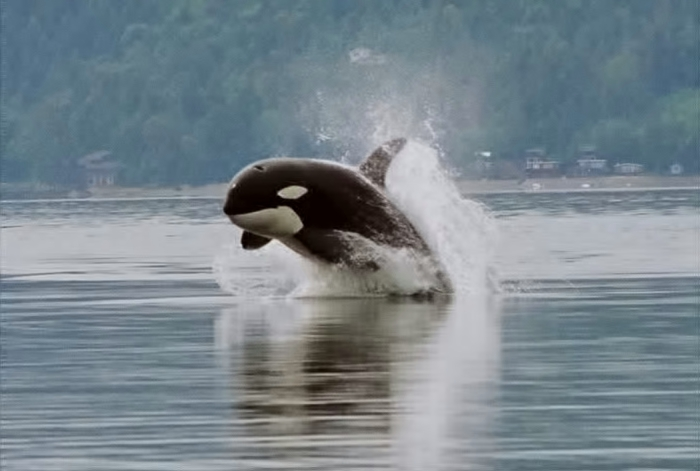
An orca breaching in Hood Canal

The marine mammals of the Salish Sea are numerous and diverse, both in taxonomy and morphology. A total of six species of pinnipeds, eight species of baleen whales, seventeen species of toothed whales, and one mustelid (the sea otter) inhabiting the local waters of the Salish Sea and the outer coastal waters over the continental shelf off Washington and British Columbia. The Salish Sea's ecosystem is characterized by cold, upwelling-drenched waters that provide nourishment for huge quantities of fish and crustaceans, the primary food of marine mammals, and as such, the diversity and abundance of marine mammals in the area are among the highest in the world.

Proximity to Seattle, accessibility, and frequent wildlife and whale watching have contributed to extensive study of the Salish Sea's marine mammals. Research originating in the region includes studies on distinct orca ecotypes and humpback whale photo-identification.

== Cetaceans ==
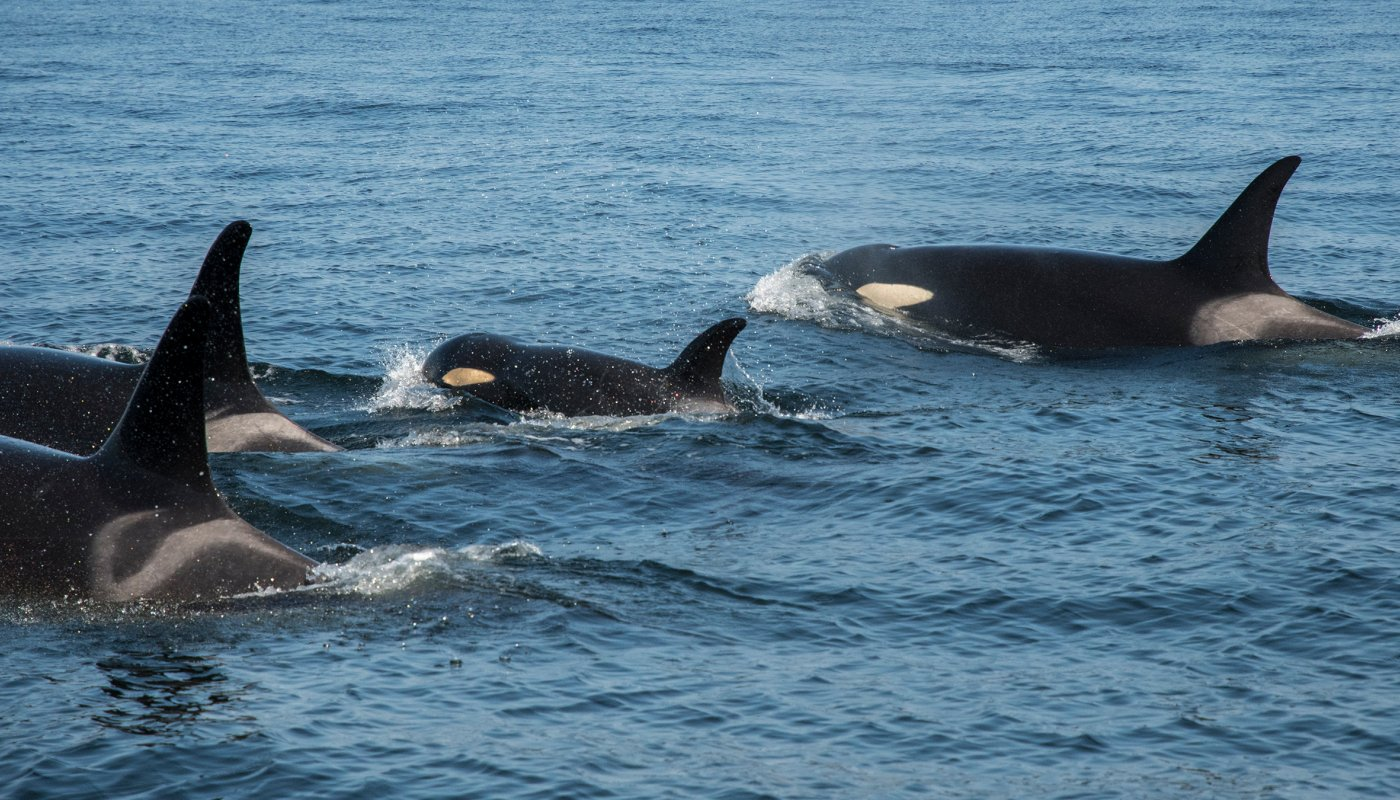
Southern resident orcas

In terms of cetaceans, both toothed and baleen whales inhabit the coastal waters of the Salish Sea and the offshore waters of Washington and British Columbia. Of these, the orca is the most famous, with humpback whales and gray whales also well known in the area. Most cetaceans, however, are usually seen in the area only as seasonal travelers or rare visitors; few stay in the area year-round in abundance.

=== Baleen whales ===
The most common baleen whale in the Salish Sea region is the humpback, primarily seen in the region around Tacoma and in the Strait of Juan de Fuca around Victoria and the San Juan Islands. It is characterized by its long flippers, bubble-net feeding techniques, frequent breaching, and exquisite, long songs. In 2022, an estimated 396 humpbacks visited and fed in Salish Sea waters over the year. A catalogue of over 1000 individual whales has been maintained since the late 1990s by the nonprofit group Humpback Whales of the Salish Sea, which documents and catalogues individual whales seen in Salish Sea waters.

The gray whale is also commonly seen, mostly in February–April as they are migrating north from Baja California to feeding areas in waters off Alaska, stopping by on their migration to feed in the Salish Sea's rich waters. Primarily seen around Whidbey Island during the summer months, they prefer shallow, sandy bottoms which provide habitat for the amphipods, shrimp, and clams they feed upon. A small group of around 20 annually forages in summer in Langley, Washington, where they are often sighted from land.

Other baleen whales sometimes seen are the common minke whale, which may be seen throughout the region, especially in summer around the San Juan Islands. Its larger relative, the fin whale, can also be seen in the area, mostly in the outer waters off the continental shelf, but occasionally makes forays into the Salish Sea area. The largest animal on earth, the blue whale, does not enter inland Salish Sea waters, but sticks to the outer coast, and is slowly increasing in population and sightings.

In October 2013, a sighting concerning a sighting of a North Pacific right whale in the Strait of Juan de Fuca, which was subsequently verified by biologists including John KB Ford; it was the first recorded instance of this species in Salish Sea waters in post-whaling times, and only the second in BC waters since 1951. Archaeological evidence suggests Canadian First Nations may have hunted this species alongside the gray and humpback whales.

=== Toothed whales ===
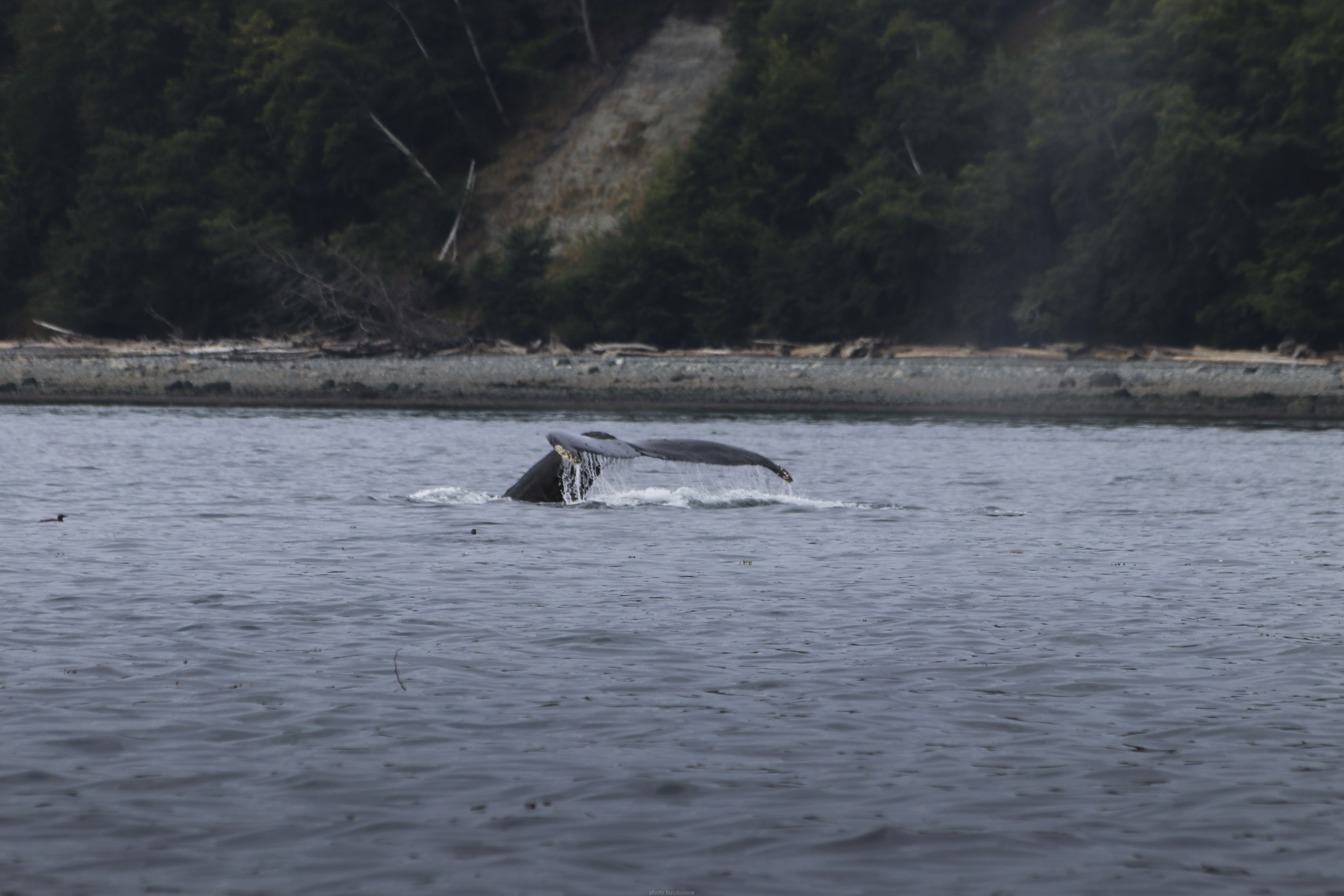
Humpback whale near Telegraph Cove 02

By far the best-known marine mammal of the region, the orca, is present in abundance throughout the Salish Sea area, in numerous well-studied clans and pods. Different ecotypes (filling different ecosystem niches) characterize Salish Sea populations. Southern resident orcas are primarily distributed in Puget Sound and the San Juan Islands; northern residents are primarily distributed in the Strait of Georgia and Johnstone Strait with some incursions into the San Juans; and transients, which venture in and out of respective habitats throughout the region and the Pacific Northwest in general. Northern and southern resident orcas both feed primarily on salmon, with chinook salmon being the bulk of their diet during spring and autumn. Transients, distinguished from residents primarily by their more falcate, shark-shaped dorsal fins and a less curved dorsal saddle, are marine mammal hunters, preferring to prey on harbor seals, sea lions, porpoises, dolphins, and sometimes large whales (especially minkes). None of the orca ecotypes interbreed, do not compete for food, rarely interact, and whenever such interactions do occur, they mostly involve brief fights. A fourth ecotype, the offshore orcas, rarely enter Salish Sea waters but do sometimes show up at the entrance to Strait of Juan de Fuca, as well as north of Vancouver Island. The distribution of different orca populations largely mirrors the different types of prey they pursue; transients primarily stick to the main San Juan Islands and the Juan de Fuca Strait, rarely entering the lower Sound where the southern residents primarily occur.

Transient orcas, rarely known to interact with residents (but are primarily dominated by the latter during the few interactions that occur) primarily frequent the Salish Sea area during spring and summer, while residents primarily shift local distribution during seasons depending on salmon abundance. During late summer and fall, southern residents spend most of their time near the Fraser River delta, feeding on the massive amounts of spring and fall chinook that comprise most of their diet during this period. Other primary sources of salmon include the Skagit, Snohomish, Puyallup, and Nisqually Rivers.

In addition to orcas, the area is also home to frequent harbor porpoises, which can be found throughout the region year-round, although their small size and shy nature mean they are hard to spot. Dall's porpoises are also sometimes seen within the area. Dolphins, such as Pacific white-sided dolphins, sometimes visit the Salish Sea, though they are more common in offshore waters. Risso's dolphins are also commonly seen, primarily along the west coast of Vancouver Island and sometimes in interior waters. Common dolphins occasionally visit the sound during warm years; in 2003, a couple of common dolphins were observed swimming near Dalco Pass and Whidbey Island; and they were observed alive in the area in 2017, 2019, and 2020, all of which involved small groups that remained in the area for months at a time and were extensively photographed and filmed. Similarly, common bottlenose dolphins, usually found from San Francisco south, were observed in Puget Sound during several months in 2017 and 2018; these sightings represent the farthest north the species has been seen aside from a sighting around the same time off the coast of northern Vancouver Island, along with false killer whales (also the northernmost recorded sighting for this species). In offshore waters, northern right whale dolphins, and sometimes even short-finned pilot whales can be seen, but these have never been known to enter interior Salish Sea waters.

In February 2018, a lone young male sperm whale was documented in Johnstone Strait, the first such sighting in interior waters away from the outer coast (their usual habitat) since 1984, though the latter detection was only on a hydrophone. The young male, named "Yukusam" (a Canadian First Nations phrase for the island where he was first seen), remained in the Salish Sea region for over a month through March and into early April. While no species of beaked whales have been seen alive in the Salish Sea, some sightings and strandings of species including the Baird's beaked whale, Cuvier's beaked whale, and mesoplodon whales have occurred in the last several decades.

== Pinnipeds ==
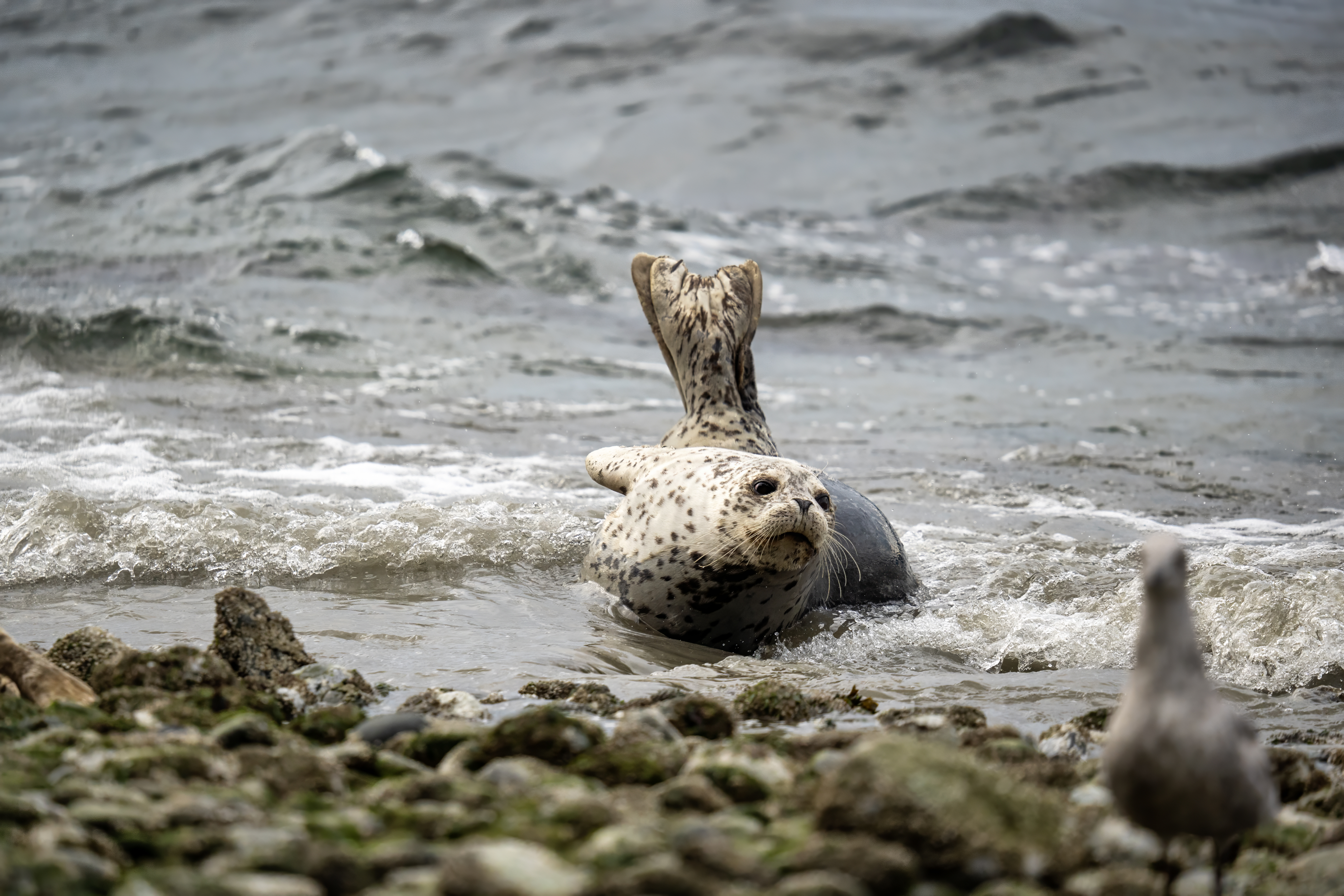
Harbor Seal (Phoca Vitulina) in Puget Sound Washington

Of the five (possibly six) species of pinnipeds in Salish Sea waters, the harbor seal is likely the most important; a total of 51,000 harbor seals are estimated to inhabit the entire Salish Sea region, with the biggest concentrations occurring on Gertrude Island, the Nisqually River mouth, and Woodard Bay in southern Puget Sound, likely because these sites are for the most part out of reach of transient orcas, their main predator. California sea lions and Steller sea lions are both common throughout the region, though the Steller sea lion is more abundant on the outer coasts and the California sea lion prefers the inner Sound region. The less common northern fur seal and northern elephant seal are primarily seasonal visitors; fur seals live most of their non-breeding lives out at sea, and usually only enter the Salish region as strays, while elephant seals come up during the summer months primarily, but immature individuals can be seen in the Sound at any time. In 2023, a bull known as "Ellison" was documented killing a harbor seal, one of the first known incidents of an elephant seal deliberately killing another pinniped.

The presence of a sixth species, the Guadalupe fur seal, in Salish Sea waters, is unconfirmed; the species has been rarely documented in Washington waters (although rare stragglers have been found in both BC and Washington) but never in inland waters of the Salish Sea. However, with the increase in numbers of the species from its near-extinction, there does remain the possibility that it may eventually enter Salish Sea waters, though probably mostly as a vagrant traveler like the northern fur seal.

== Sea otter ==
The sea otter is the only non-cetacean and non-pinniped marine mammal to be found in the Salish Sea, though it is primarily a rare visitor or vagrant. Established sea otter populations currently inhabit the outer Washington coast from the Queets River mouth to Cape Flattery, and then slightly eastward to Clallam Bay. Another population, on the coast of Vancouver Island, ranges from Telegraph Cove to Clayoquot Sound, with frequent vagrant sightings throughout the island, particularly near Victoria and Sooke. Other vagrant sea otters have been spotted in the San Juan Islands, Puget Sound, and occasionally even in the upper Sound south of Tacoma Narrows, though many alleged sightings in the Sound are confusions with North American river otters.
