= Englewood =

Englewood is a corruption of Dutch Engelse woud (English woods or forest) & Engelse buurt, or "English Neighborhood", which originally referred to Englewood, New Jersey's status as one of the few English-speaking settlements in Dutch-speaking New Netherland. Despite the similarity in the name and original meaning, the name is not related to Inglewood. Today, the name may refer to:

== Places ==
Canada

- Englewood, British Columbia

United States

- Englewood, California
- Englewood, Colorado
  - Englewood (RTD), transit station in Englewood, Colorado
  - Federal Correctional Institution, Englewood
- Englewood, Florida
- Englewood (Columbus, Georgia), a neighborhood
- Englewood, Chicago, Illinois
  - West Englewood, Chicago, Illinois
- Englewood, Kansas
- Englewood, Missouri
- Englewood, New Jersey
- Englewood Cliffs, New Jersey
- Englewood, Ohio
- Englewood, South Dakota
- Englewood, Tennessee
- Englewood, Wisconsin

== Other ==
- the Englewood Railway in British Columbia

== See also ==
- Inglewood
