= Lower Tsitika River Provincial Park =

Provincial park in British Columbia, Canada

Lower Tsitka River Provincial Park
- IUCN category II (national park)
- Location within British Columbia
- Interactive map of Lower Tsitka River Provincial Park
- Location: British Columbia, Canada
- Nearest city: Port McNeill
- Coordinates: 50°27′29″N 126°35′20″W
- Area: 37.45 km^{2} (14.46 sq mi)
- Established: July 12, 1995
- Governing body: BC Parks

Lower Tsitika River Provincial Park is a provincial park in British Columbia, Canada.

== History ==
The park was established on July 12, 1995.

== Geography ==
The park is 3,745 hectares (9,250 acres) in size. This park protects the lands between three previously established Ecological Reserves, namely Tsitika Mountain Ecological Reserve, Mt. Derby Ecological Reserve and Robson Bight (Michael Bigg) Ecological Reserve.

The park is located 20 kilometres (12 mi) east of Woss, British Columbia on Vancouver Island.

== Conservation ==
The reserve helps to protect the upland portions of Robson Bight (Michael Bigg) Ecological Reserve and its sensitive Orca habitat.

== Recreation ==
The recreational activities available are backcountry camping, hiking and fishing. The park receives minimal visits as hikers are prohibited from entering the Tsitika River estuary.

== See also ==
- List of British Columbia Provincial Parks
- List of Canadian provincial parks
