= Depot Protection System =

A Depot Protection System (DPS) is a system designed to protect staff and equipment by ensuring the safe and controlled movement of rail vehicles into and out of train maintenance depots, a process sometimes known as train movements or shunting. This allows train maintenance operations to be conducted without endangering the safety of staff, and damaging other maintenance equipment in the depot.

The most important asset in the depot are the people working there, therefore the depot protection system needs to deliver the highest level of personnel security.

== Depot protection system components ==
A depot protection system consists of these basic elements:

- a method of warning staff when trains are moving or about to start moving.
- some method of physical protection is highly desirable and this may include a derailer or wheel stop. These, when raised, would intentionally derail any unauthorised train attempting to enter the depot, thereby protecting staff and equipment in the depot.
- the shunt signals that give the train driver permission to either enter or exit the maintenance building.
- an operator control panel which allows personnel to fix their protection and to allow the designated person to accept a train into the depot, or to release a train from the depot when it is safe to do so.

== Traditional method for personnel protection ==
Traditionally protection to personnel working in the depot was provided using padlocks. Staff would fit these padlocks onto manual derailers or onto the signal control panel before starting work. With the padlocks in place, it would not be possible to lower the physical protection or access the control panel to set the driver signal to proceed.

Unfortunately although widely installed these simple padlock systems do have some draw backs. Padlocks often had to be destroyed when staff forgot to remove them at the end of the working period, in which case they would have to be cut off (though this can be resolved by using a system of padlocks incorporating a master key, to which the supervisor has access). It is also a slow procedural system with poor traceability in the event of an incident. This led to the development of more advanced electronic systems that overcame these weaknesses.

== Advanced depot protection system ==
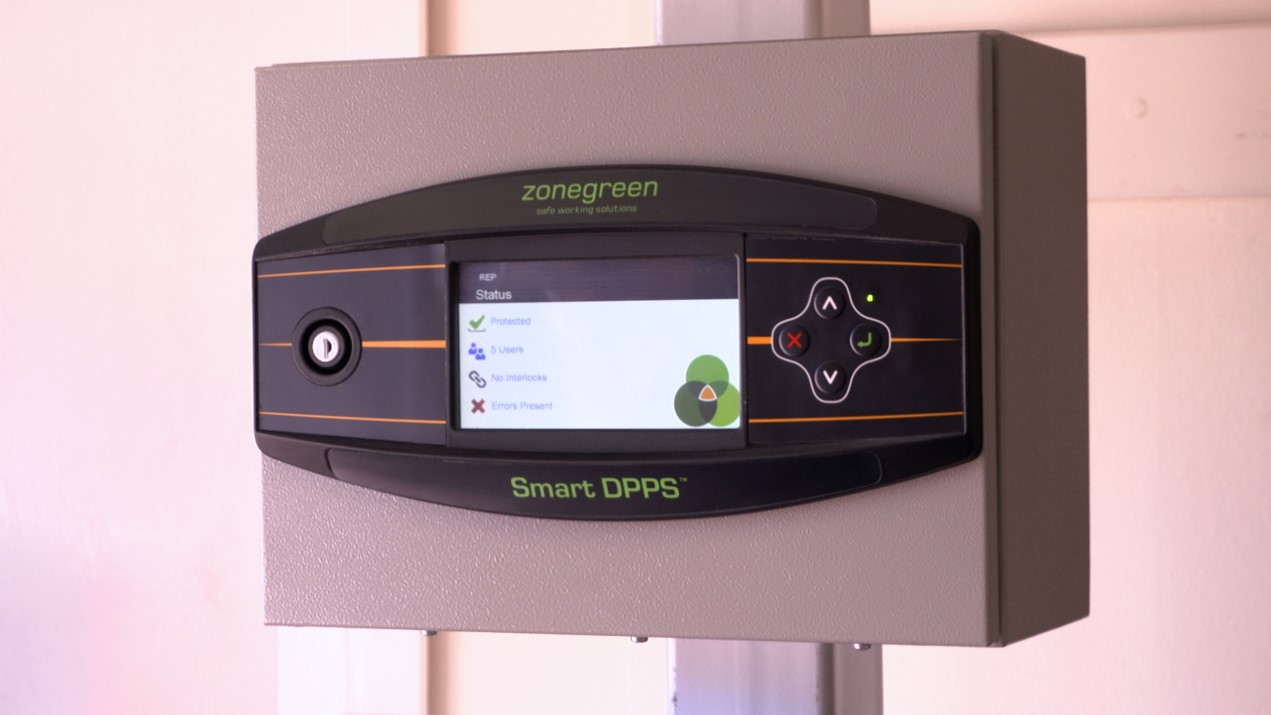
Operator control panel with RFID

More technically advanced depot protection systems consist of a number of control panels installed at predetermined locations, operating using RFID tags, in place of padlocks. Each user is issued with a personal RFID tag, a portable memory device which stores the user's login details and operational level electronically. Before starting work, the user logs into the system at the nearest control panel to "apply personal protection" to themselves while they are working in the depot. Once a user is logged into the system, the DPS will inhibit removal of train movement protection and clearing of driver signals, therefore preventing a shunter/team leader to authorise a train movement, until all users have logged out of the system.

This system can reduce some of the 'walk time' associated with traditional systems (staff can log on at conveniently located control panels, rather than having to walk to one designated location to apply their personal padlock) but conversely, the ability to log on remotely from the work site does give rise to the opportunity of staff logging on to the wrong work site (e.g. the wrong road in the maintenance shed).

Advanced depot protection systems can provide performance monitoring software via the integration with data acquisition and monitoring systems. This allows maintenance supervisors to remotely monitor, for instance, the status of the road, who is working in each road, and the status of other interlocked maintenance equipment, enabling them to plan maintenance tasks and train movement operation more effectively. This can help identify operational efficiency savings and provide traceability in the event of an incident.

Modern protection systems installed at today’s depots may consist of the following equipment:

- Operator control panel
- Shunt signals
- Derailer
- Treadle/Track switches
- Audio visual warnings
- TPWS

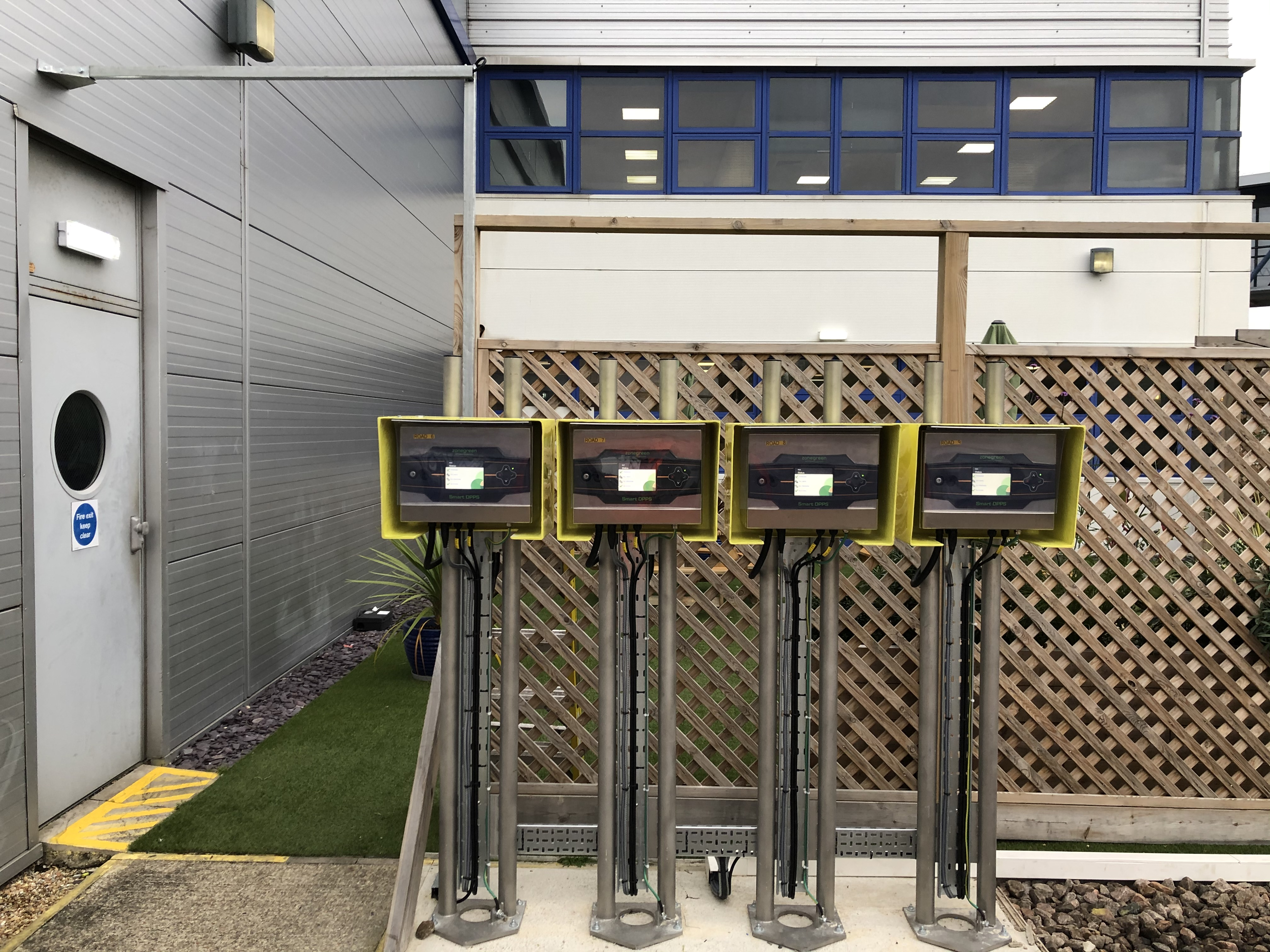
Operator control panels in weatherproof enclosures for outdoor use

=== Operator control panel ===
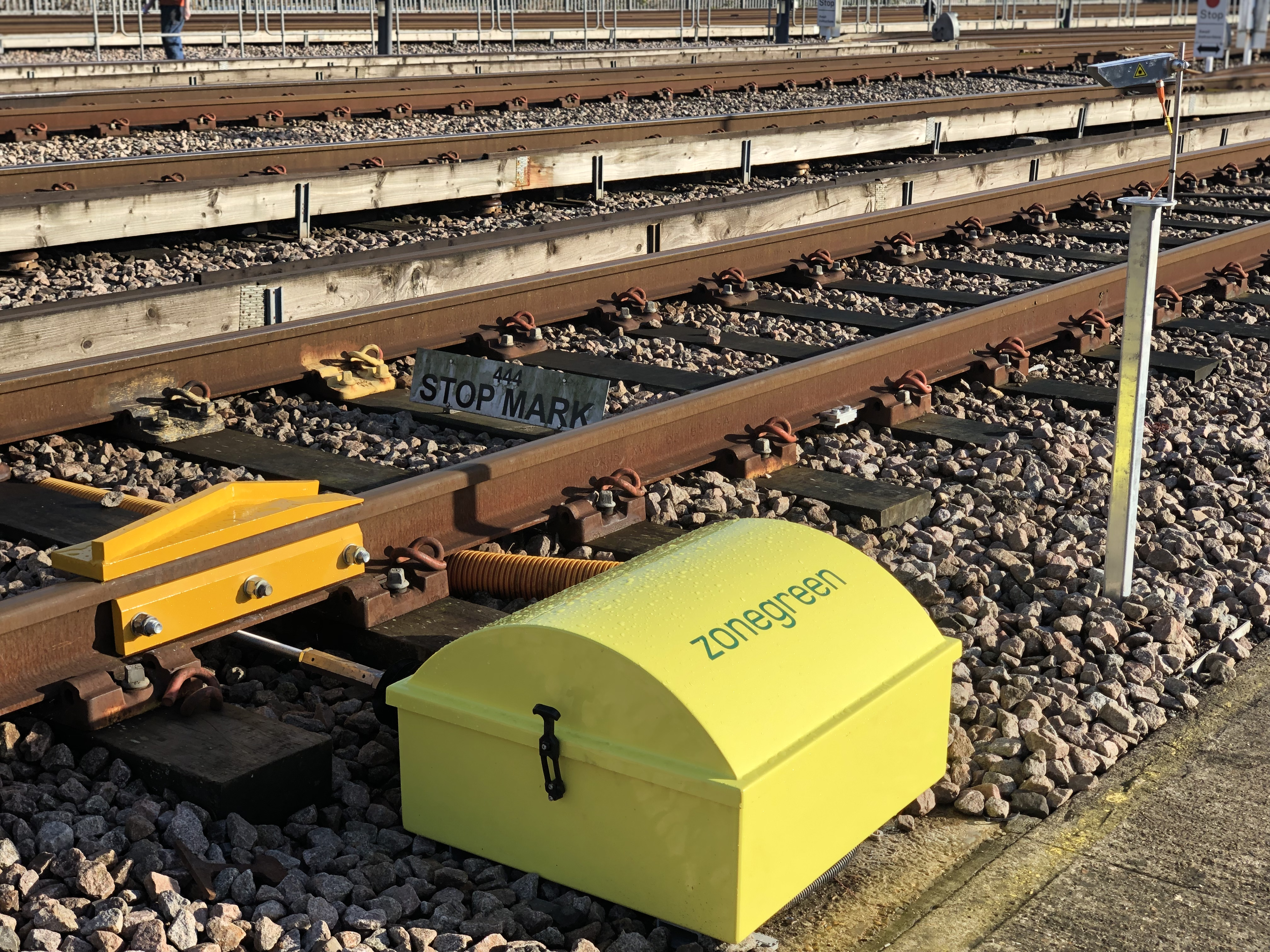
Network Rail Approved Powered Derailer

The operator control panel is installed inside the entrance door of each road. These panels control movements into and out of the depot. Staff access the system using a RFID tag that stores their personal details and replaces the traditional personal padlock in older safety systems. Installing a dedicated panel at each road ends offers increased system resilience removing the risk of a single point of failure.

=== Shunt signals ===
Shunt signals are located at the entrance and exit of the workshop to indicate to the driver whether it is safe to proceed. Inbound signals are mounted on low level galvanised stands, whilst outbound signals are placed at cab height on galvanised stands or standoff brackets.

=== Derailer ===
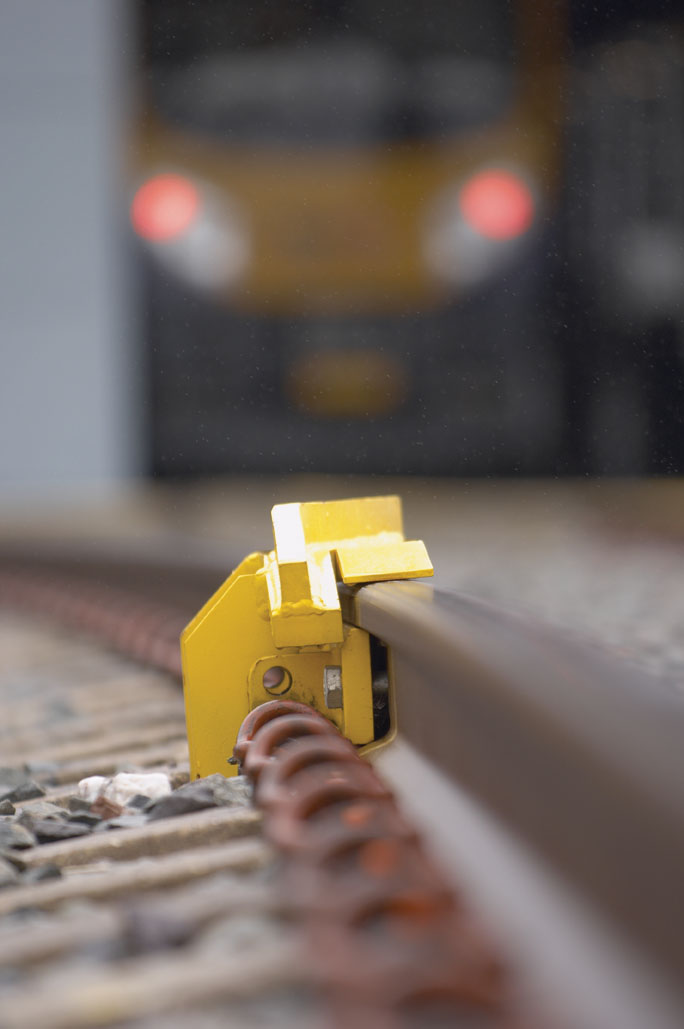
Derailer in a raised position

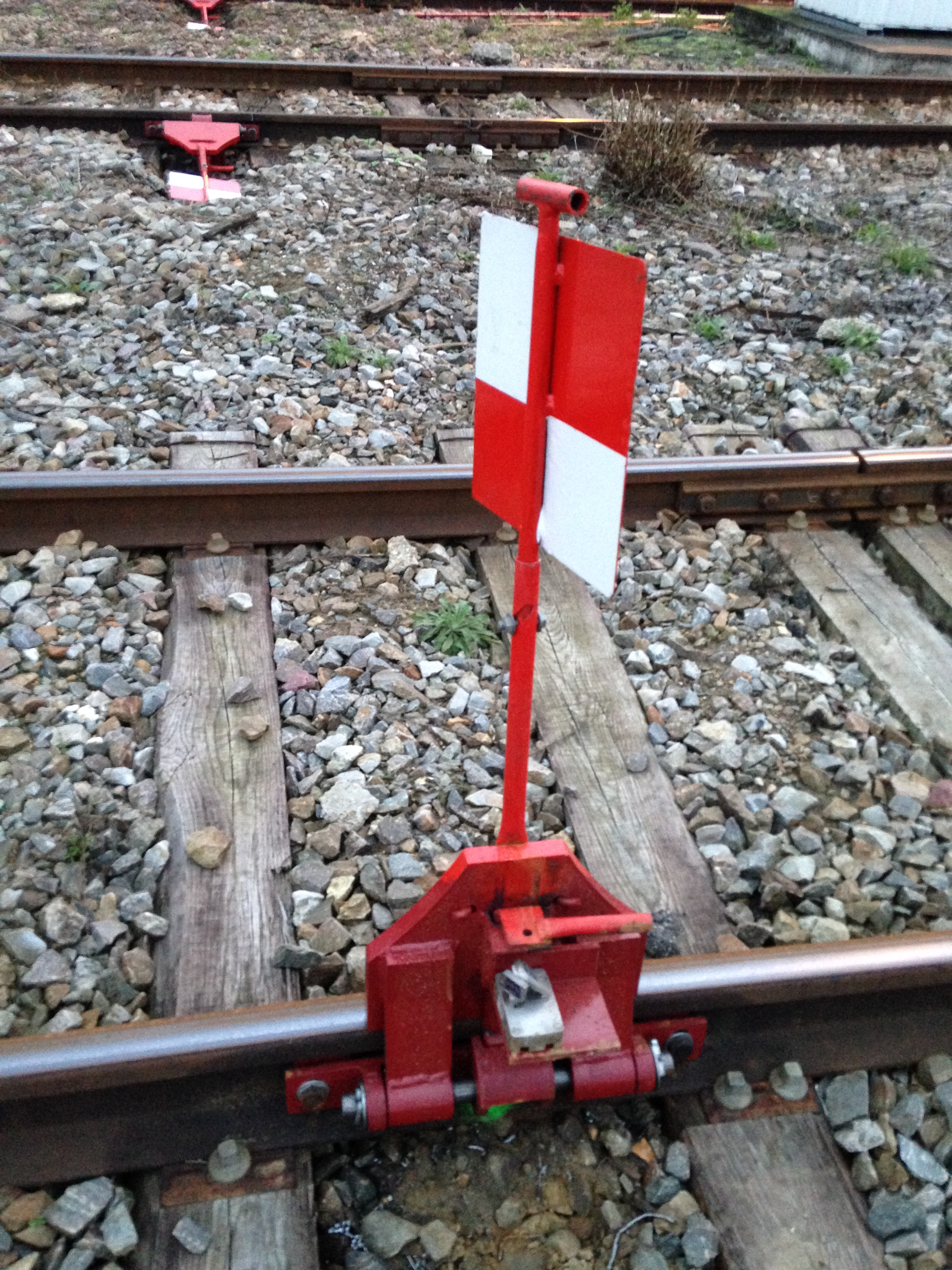
trainstopper TPWS taquet

Derailers are electrically powered. They have traditionally been regarded as the ultimate safeguard in preventing vehicle access and are fitted to tracks approaching the depot. However, derailers do have drawbacks - they can result in significant damage to infrastructure and Traction and Rolling Stock in the event of a derailment (which can be costly and extremely disruptive to operations) and in some cases, can be ineffective or restrictive (they cannot be fitted in close vicinity to check rails, for example).

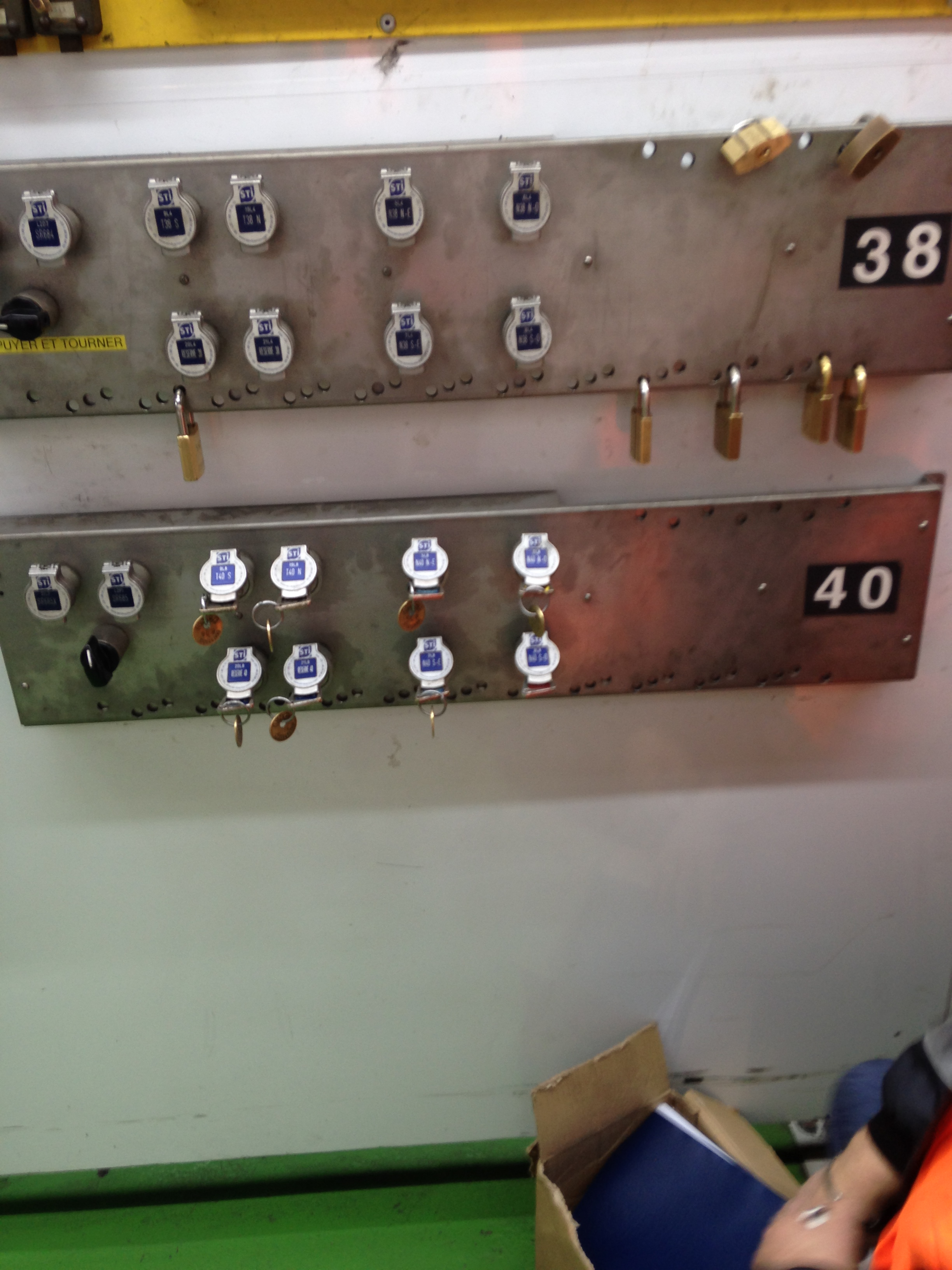
padlockable DPS

=== Treadle/Track switches ===
Treadle/Track switches are fitted to the tracks approaching the depot to warn operatives of a vehicle’s approach. They are triggered by the passing wheel and can be used to indicate that a vehicle is waiting.

=== Audio visual warnings ===
Audio visual warnings are beacon signal lamps and klaxons which are installed above each track within the depot and within the pit and are used to display the status of the protection system.

=== TPWS ===
An alternative to using derailers is to equip the system with TPWS. This equipment safeguards staff from unauthorised movements by using the automatic safety equipment fitted to the driving cabs of all main-line registered traction and rolling stock in the UK. Any unplanned movement will cause the train to automatically come to a stand when it has passed the relevant signal set at 'danger'. This has the added benefit of preventing damage to the infrastructure, traction and rolling stock that a derailer system causes.

Most commonly known as the Trayvou Train Stopper, these are widely used in electrified and non-electrified depots to protect against train movement. They are widely used in continental Europe in the vicinity of the maintenance depot. They are suitable for any kind of rolling stock, as long as the train doesn't exceed 6km/h. For Depot Protection purposes they are: highly sufficient, much more cost-effective, easy to maintain and easier to implement than derailing systems. And have a greatly reduced impact to infracture and operations compared to a derailer.

TPWS equipped depot protection systems are only suitable for locations where vehicles are driven in and out by a leading driving cab. They are not suitable for use at a maintenance building that undertakes largely loose coaching stock or wagon maintenance. Where vehicle movements are undertaken by a propelling shunting loco (as the lead vehicles would not be equipped with the relevant TPWS safety equipment).

=== Remote access terminals ===
Remote login/logout panels can be installed at any locations to provide convenient access points for staff to logon to the depot protection system to apply for protection prior to work, or to log out of the system, thereby removing their protection from train movement, after they have finished work.

=== Monitoring and logging facilities ===
The status of all DPS subsystems, such as derailer status, road status, logon users and interlock equipment can be viewed or queried in the control room via a graphical monitoring station. This facilitates operational planning and decision making. The ability of the system to record all DPS related activities, such as login, logout, movement operation, provides full traceability for future safety audits and incidents investigations.

== Conclusion ==
To maximise availability and profitability, train maintenance facilities must handle complex train maintenance operations ever more quickly and efficiently; whilst increasing safety. Depot protection systems play an important role in enhancing the safety of staff working in train maintenance facilities and the efficiency of maintenance operations by providing a safe, reliable and efficient way to protect staff, and a safe controlled procedure for moving trains into and out of the maintenance facility.
