= Beaver Cove (British Columbia) =

Cove in British Columbia

Coordinates: 50°32′30″N 126°51′29″W

Beaver Cove is a cove on Northern Vancouver Island, immediately to the south of the junction of Johnstone and Broughton Straits. The community of the same name is located at the head of the cove, as was a now-former logging community, Englewood. The mouth of the Kokish River is at the head of the cove, southeast of the site of Englewood. Also on the cove, on its southeast shore northeast of the community of Beaver Cove, is the community of Kokish.

== Name origin ==
Like Beaver Harbour near Port Hardy, Beaver Cove was named for the Beaver, a Hudson's Bay Company vessel that was the first steamship on the northwest coast of North America.

== See also ==
- Beaver Cove (disambiguation)
