= Beaver Harbour =

Beaver Harbour may refer to one of the following places :

- Beaver Harbour, New Brunswick, Canada
- Beaver Harbour, a local service district in Pennfield Parish, New Brunswick, Canada
- Beaver Harbour, Nova Scotia, Canada
- Beaver Harbour (British Columbia), a bay on Vancouver Island, Canada

== See also ==
- Beaver Cove (disambiguation)
- Beaver (disambiguation)
