= Beaver Harbour (British Columbia) =

Bay on northern Vancouver Island, Canada

Coordinates: 50°42′34″N 127°24′31″W

Beaver Harbour is a harbour or bay on northern Vancouver Island, British Columbia, Canada, located to the east of the town of Port Hardy. Beaver Harbour Provincial Park was located on the west side of the bay but was transferred to local governance in 1970.

== History and name origin ==
Spanish commanders Galiano and Valdez conferred the name Puerto de Guemes after the Viceroy of Mexico. The harbour was labelled "Daedalus Harbour" on an 1850 sketch by a Mr. Dillon of the Royal Navy, after HMS Daedalus; the name "Beaver Harbour" first appeared on Lieutenant Mansell's 1851 plan of the harbour.

Beaver Harbour, like Beaver Cove, was named for Beaver, the first steam vessel on the Pacific Northwest Coast, which was in service to the Hudson's Bay Company for many decades until wrecked at Prospect Point in Stanley Park, Vancouver, in 1888.

== See also ==
- Beaver Harbour (disambiguation)
- Beaver (disambiguation)
