= Derail =

Device that intentionally derails trains due to safety reasons

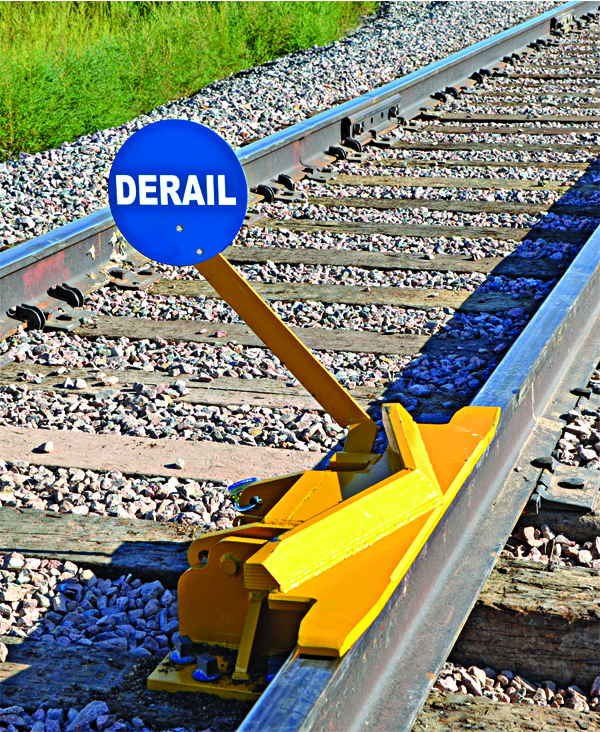
Hinged derail with automatic blue flag

A derail or derailer is a device used to prevent fouling (blocking or compromising) of a rail track (or collision with anything present on the track, such as a person, or a train) by unauthorized movements of trains or unattended rolling stock. The device works by derailing the equipment as it rolls over or through it.

Although accidental derailment is damaging to equipment and track, and requires considerable time and expense to remedy, derails are used in situations where there is a risk of greater damage to equipment, injury or death if equipment is allowed to proceed past the derail point.

== Applications ==
A derailed train car at a closed siding

Derails may be applied:

- Where sidings meet main lines or other through tracks
- At junctions or other crossings to protect the interlocking against unauthorized movement
- Temporarily at an area where crews are working on a rail line
- Approaching a drawbridge, dead end, or similar hazard

== Design ==
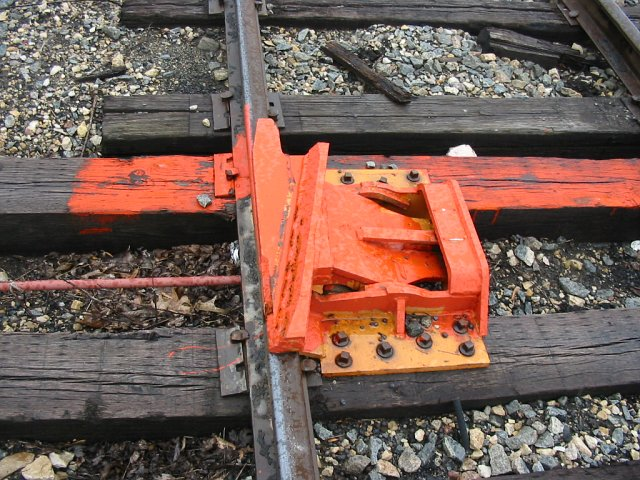
A derail device installed on a siding at Glen Haven, Wisconsin, oriented to protect track located off the bottom of the picture

There are four basic forms of derail.

=== Wedge ===
The most common form is a wedge-shaped piece of steel which fits over the top of the rail. If a car or locomotive attempts to roll over it, the wheel flange is lifted over the rail to the outside, derailing it. When not in use, the derail folds away, leaving the rail unobstructed. It can be manually or remotely operated; in the former case it will have a lock applied to prevent it from being moved by unauthorized personnel. This type is common on North American railroads.

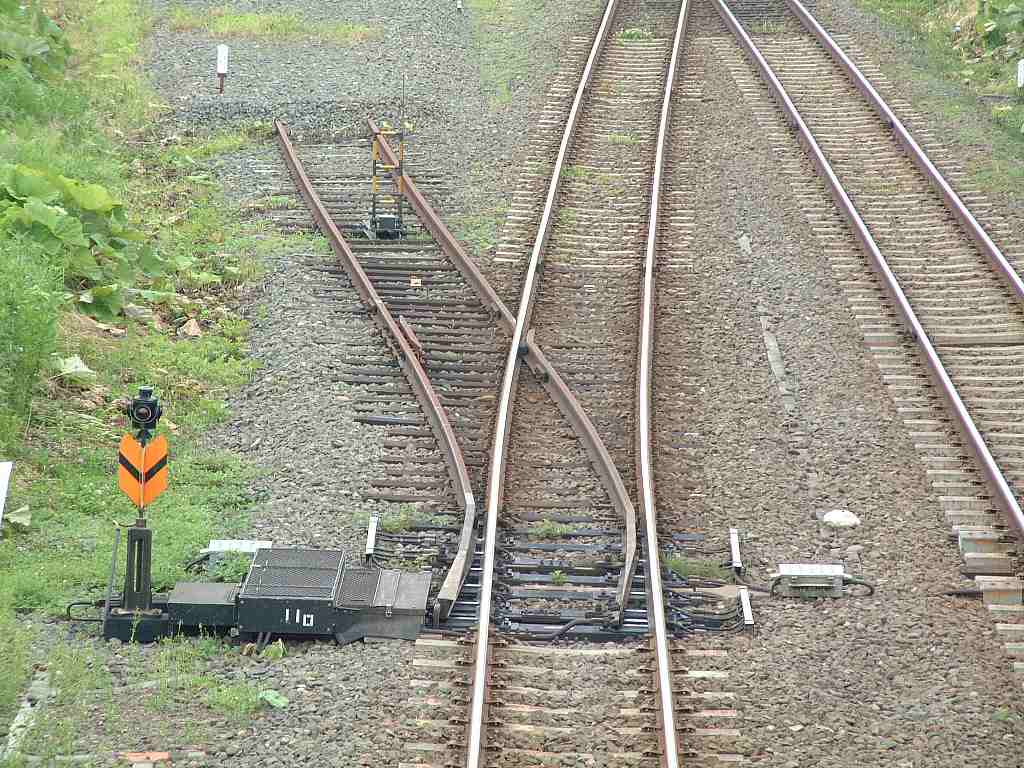
Derail on Nemuro Main Line, JR Hokkaido. It is set so that a train proceeding away from the camera will remain on the track.

=== Split rail ===
The second type of derail is the "split rail" type. These are basically a complete or partial railroad switch which directs the errant rolling stock away from the main line. This form is common throughout the UK, where it is called catch points or trap points.

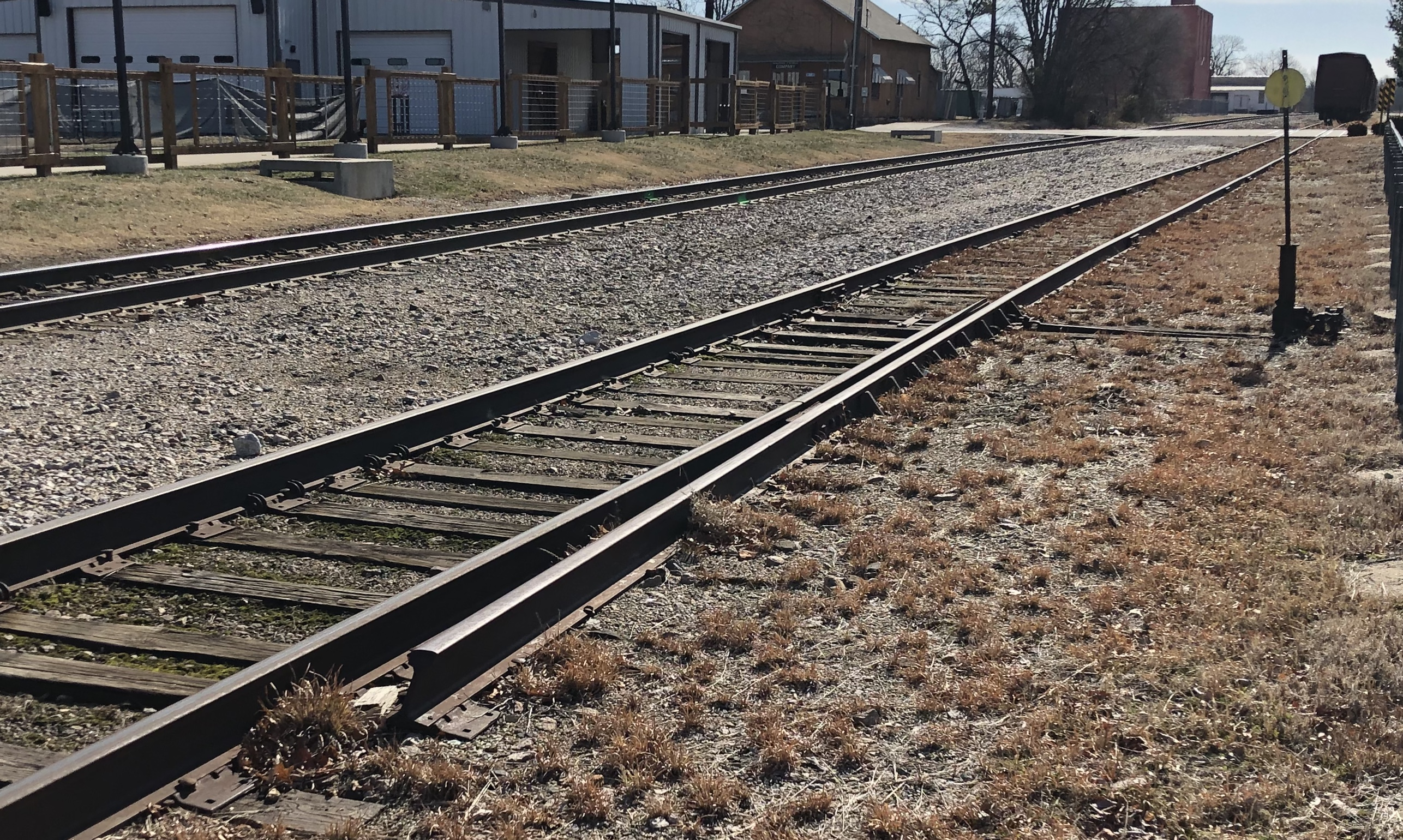
Split rail type derail on the A&M in Rogers, Arkansas

=== Portable ===
The third type of derail is the portable derail, and is used by railroad mechanical crews, as well as some industries. This is often used in conjunction with blue flag rules (meaning equipment on the track must not be moved, as workers are on or near the equipment) and is temporary in nature. They are placed onto one side of the rail with the derail pointed to the outside of the track. Then there is a part of the derail that is able to be tightened down to the rail and then secured with a locking mechanism. In the United States, if the derail is left unlocked for any reason or does not have a locking mechanism deployed then the owner of the derail can face substantial fines if found by an FRA inspector (49 CFR 218.109.).

=== Powered ===
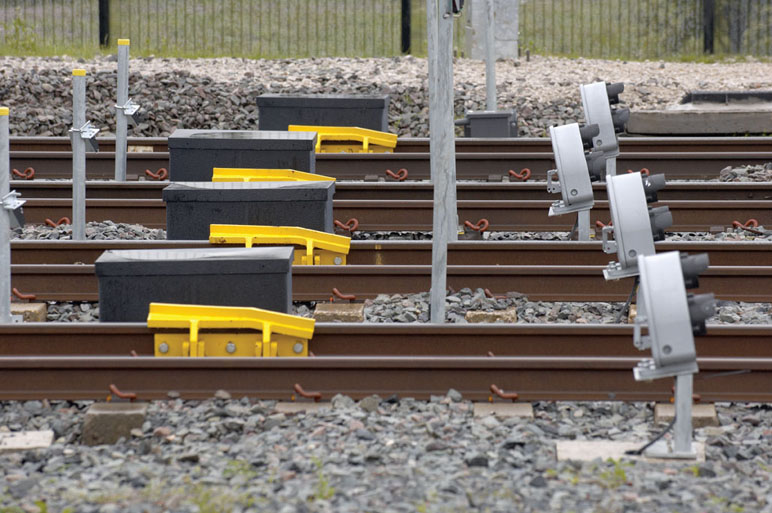
Powered derailers, Temple Mills, Eurostar Maintenance Depot, UK

The fourth type of derailer is the powered or motorized derailer, electronically powered through an actuator. This type of derailer can be controlled remotely from an external control panel or manually. It is commonly installed as a part of Depot Personnel Protection Systems, to ensure personnel safety in maintenance workshops and depots.

== Failures ==
Derails have failed on occasion. Examples include:

- 1958 Newark Bay rail accident: On September 15, 1958 in Newark Bay, New Jersey, United States, when a Central Railroad of New Jersey (CNJ) morning commuter train, #3314, ran through a restricting and a stop signal, derailed, and slid off the open Newark Bay lift bridge. Although the derailer did work, it was insufficient as #3314 had such great speed that it was unable to stop in time.
- CSX 8888 incident: On May 15, 2001, CSX 8888, pulling a train of 47 cars including some loaded with hazardous chemicals, ran uncontrolled for two hours at up to 82 kilometers per hour (51 mph). A portable derail was used but failed.
- Englewood Railway incident: On April 20, 2017, three workers were killed in an accident on the Englewood Railway in Woss, British Columbia, when 11 runaway rail cars full of logs crashed into them and their equipment while they were working on the line. The railcars had become uncoupled at the top of the hill and as they rolled out-of-control down the hill, they overpowered the derails which had been installed incorrectly and into rotting rail ties.

== See also ==
- Buffer stop
- Catch points
