= Kokish =

Community in British Columbia

Coordinates: 50°32′00″N 126°51′00″W

Kokish is a community in northern Vancouver Island, British Columbia, Canada, located on the southeast shore of Beaver Cove. Also on Beaver Cove are the community of Beaver Cove and a former logging camp, Englewood, which is northwest of the mouth of the Kokish River at the head of the cove.

== Etymology ==
Kokish is an adaptation of k'wagis, meaning "notched beach", the name of a former village at the mouth of the river. Another meaning given by artist and chief Mungo Martin is that Kokish is a corruption of the Kwak'wala word, Gwegis, for "place where river spreads".

== See also ==
- List of settlements in British Columbia
