= Kokish River =

River on Northern Vancouver Island

Coordinates: 50°31′53″N 126°52′17″W

The Kokish River is a river on Northern Vancouver Island, flowing north into Beaver Cove. The community of Beaver Cove is near the river's mouth, as was the former logging camp of Englewood. The community of Kokish is also on Beaver Cove, but on its southeast shore away from the river-mouth.

== Name origin ==
Kokish is an adaptation of k'wagis, meaning "notched beach", the name of a former village at the mouth of the river. Another meaning given by artist and chief Mungo Martin is that Kokish is a corruption of the Kwak'wala word, Gwegis, for "place where river spreads". Kokish can also be taken to mean a place where two rivers run together.

== See also ==
- List of rivers of British Columbia
