= Inglewood, South Africa =

Inglewood
- Location within Eastern Cape Location within South Africa
- Coordinates: 33.0770°S 27.5516°E
- Country: South Africa
- Province: Eastern Cape
- Municipality: Buffalo City

Area
  - Total: 1.16 km^{2} (0.45 sq mi)

Population (2011)
  - Total: 868
  - Density: 748/km^{2} (1,940/sq mi)

Racial makeup (2011)
  - Black African: 100.0%

First languages (2011)
  - Xhosa: 94.9%
  - Sign language: 2.6%
  - Other: 2.4%
- Time zone: UTC+2 (SAST)

Inglewood is a town in Buffalo City in the Eastern Cape province of South Africa.
