= Inglewood Children's Home =

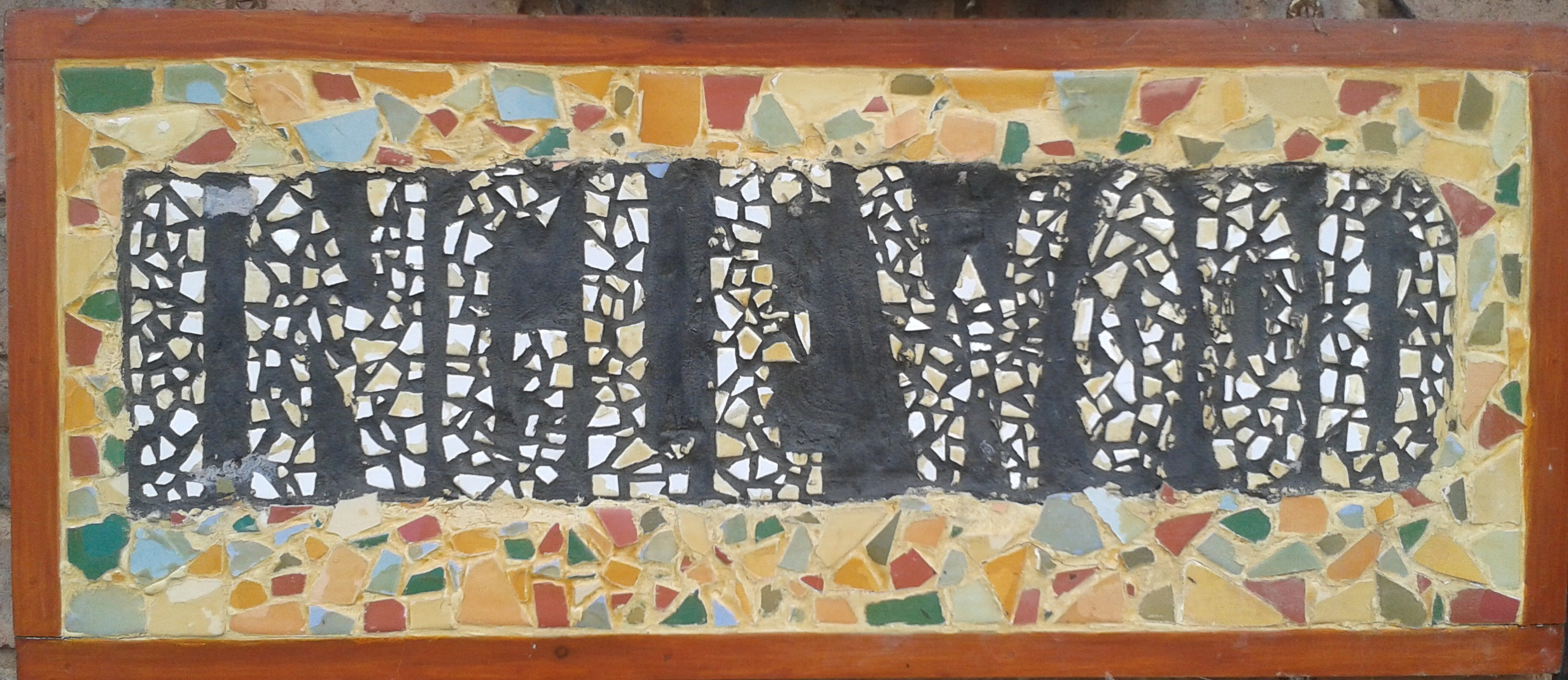
- Type: Leeds City Council
- Industry: Leeds Social Services
- Predecessor: None
- Founded: 1899
- Defunct: 19 September 2013
- Fate: Closed
- Successor: None
- Headquarters: Social Services Department Merrion House Leeds, England
- Area served: West Yorkshire
- Key people: Susan Noble (Manager)
- Services: Children's Social Care
- Number of employees: 22 (as of 2013)

Inglewood Children's Home was a children's home in Otley, West Yorkshire founded in 1899.

== History ==
The home was originally built on Inglewood Drive in 1899 but in the mid-1980s was moved to Whitley Croft Garth in a cul-de-sac. The home originally housed up to 16 young people in the mid-1990s but over time the number reduced to 8 by 2011.

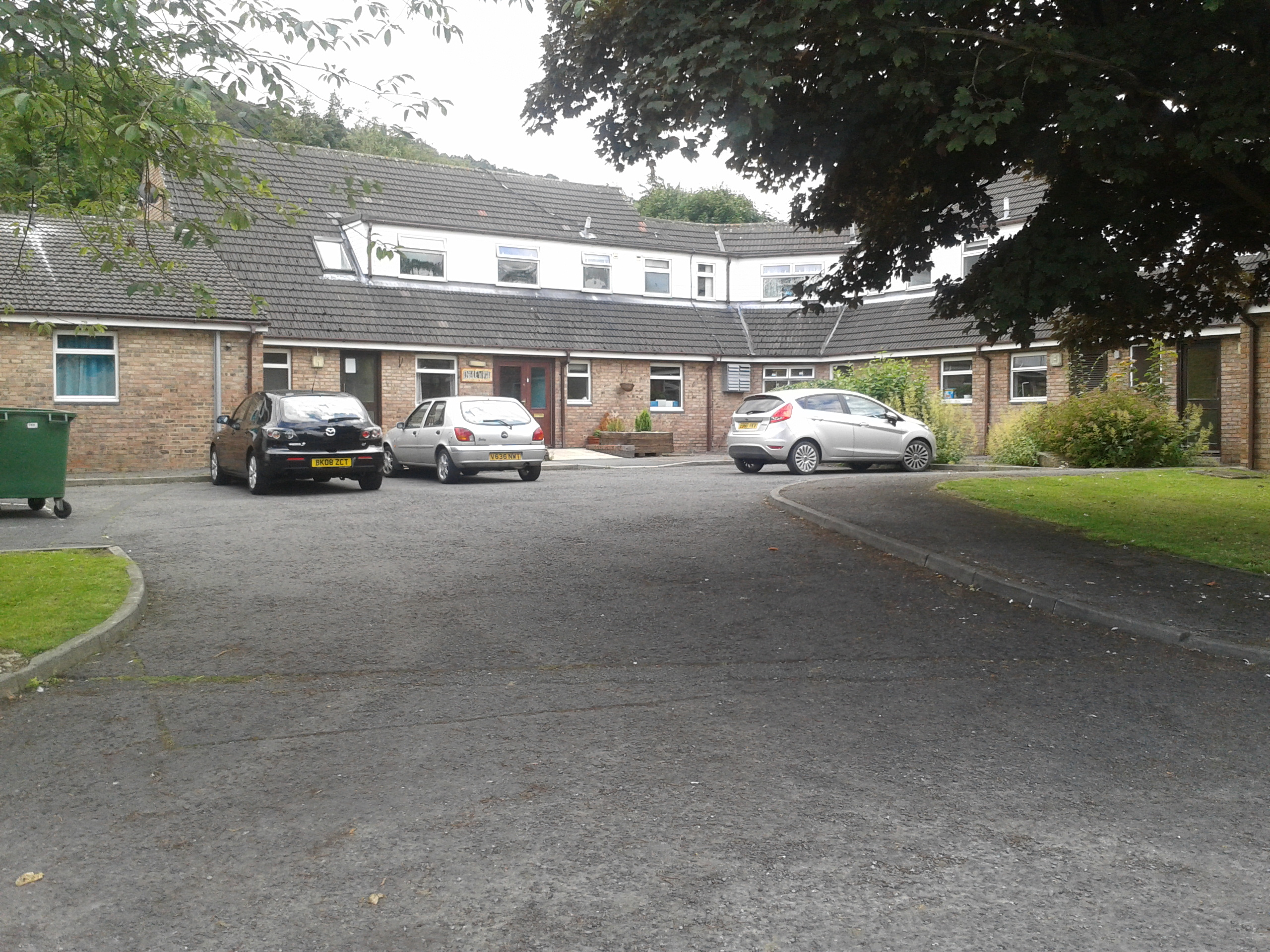
Inglewood Front Building

== Closure ==
In May 2013 Children's Services decided that the home should be closed and open three smaller homes in its place.

=== New Criteria For Residential Provision ===
Leeds City Council stated criteria that residential provision had to meet to remain open, these were;

- Homes should as far as possible replicate family life. They should be small and set within local communities. Homes should be part of the community and contribute to community life
- All homes will be run based on restorative practice principles
- Except in exceptional circumstances, children's homes should not be seen as permanence option
- Children must have an individual and clear care plan, placement plan and personal education plan which supports their development
- Children must be supported to participate in their own plans, in the running of the home and in service development
- Children should be encouraged to develop positive interests and participate in a range of activities.

In the Children's Services Scrutiny Board report they gave this conclusion about the future of Inglewood based on the new criteria for children's homes.

Inglewood children's home is in a very large home in Otley, built on a difficult to manage footprint at the end of a cul de sac with sheltered housing for the elderly. The home does not fit with the principle of smaller group homes and therefore the long term plan is close the home and reinvest resource into a smaller home at a time when the demand for residential places as a whole has sufficiently reduced or when smaller homes developed with environments and neighbourhoods are available."

=== Closure aftermath ===
The home officially ceased to be a Children's Home as of 31 August 2013 but staff were deployed there until 19 September 2013. All the staff and young people at the home were relocated although it was reported that one cleaner was made redundant and had to find work outside of Leeds City Council. The children at the home said "the closure was disruptive." In 2014 Roy Walker, the Service Delivery Manager for Residential Services in Leeds City Council, had confirmed the plans to replace the home with three smaller homes was scrapped due to funding.

== Young people ==
Most recently Chris Bevan who lived at the home for over 11 years and moved out in 2008. He has released a song for Help for Heroes, attended university earning a degree in music and had an appearance on The Michael Ball Show and has now become a barrister.

Also famous drag act Bosom Buddies from Britain's Got Talent 2013 Semi-Finalist one member Mark Wood lived at the Children's Home in the 1970s in the original building.

== Controversy ==
Inglewood Children's Home over its duration had hundreds of calls out to the police regarding children continually absconding from the site. The home had violent crime, vehicle crime and countless amounts of damage amongst thefts. Elderly residents nearby lived in fear they described due to noise and damage to their homes. Although at a committee about Inglewood Children's Home in late 2011 Inspector Coldwell of West Yorkshire Police said that police calls outs to the home were declining. Local residents in the 1990s and 2000s filed several petitions and called upon councillors and MPs to close the home. On several OFSTED inspections of the home failed repeatedly on safeguarding issues and of "homeliness" which Leeds City Councillors were called upon to change. However, the Home was reported to have been making some progress by early 2012 but by March 2013 the decision to close remained and was fulfilled.

=== Jimmy Savile scandal ===
Mark Wood confirmed that child sex offender and television host Jimmy Savile visited the home and had picnics with the children on many occasions which Mark has said he did not see anyone abused but the said that the children at the home felt very uncomfortable around him.
