= Englewood, British Columbia =

Former community in British Columbia

Coordinates: 50°31′39″N 126°52′01″W

Englewood was a community located at the head of Beaver Cove on Northern Vancouver Island, British Columbia, Canada. Beaver Cove is on the south side of the Johnstone Strait, between Robson Bight and Port McNeill. The mouth of the Kokish River is to the southeast of the former site of Englewood.

== History ==
The name Englewood was first adopted in September 1930 as the name of a post office and steamer landing. The post office name in the area was moved across the cove to the community of Beaver Cove in 1958. By 1967, the BC Forest Service informed the provincial names office that only a 10-man logging camp remained at the site. But in 1984, a sailing guide commented that its wharves and buildings were in ruin. The name and accompanying designation as a community

Englewood as a name is a derivation of the local sawmill company's name, Wood & English Logging company. The name survives today as that of the Englewood Railway, the last logging railroad operating in North America, which runs from Beaver Cove to Vernon camp for a total length of 84 miles.

== See also ==
- List of settlements in British Columbia
- Englewood (disambiguation)
