= Robson Bight =

Bay of Vancouver Island

Coordinates: 50°28′59″N 126°34′59″W

Robson Bight is a small Vancouver Island bay at the west end of Johnstone Strait across from West Cracroft Island in British Columbia, Canada that includes a protected killer whale habitat famous for its whale-rubbing beaches. The bight is adjacent to Lower Tsitika River Provincial Park. The nearest access point is Telegraph Cove on the east coast of Northern Vancouver Island.

== Ecological Reserve ==
Robson Bight (Michael Bigg) Ecological Reserve was established in 1982 as a sanctuary for killer whales. The area, 10 km south east of Telegraph Cove and 40 km from Port McNeill, British Columbia, is restricted. Access by boat or land is prohibited. The Robson Bight Warden Program is operated by the Cetus Research and Conservation Society. This program educates visitors to the area about the Ecological Reserve and asks visitors to remain outside the Ecological Reserve boundaries. The Reserve extends 1 km offshore from markers at either end of the Reserve. The total area of the reserve, including upland and foreshore, is 5,460 hectares. It is named after the late killer whale researcher Michael Bigg.

== Naming ==
Robson Bight is named for Lieutenant Commander Charles Rufus Robson of the gunboat HMS Forward who died in Victoria, British Columbia on November 5, 1861, from a fall from a horse after a commendable career.

== Barge Spill ==
On August 20, 2007, a barge carrying vehicles and forestry equipment lost 11 pieces of equipment within the boundaries of the protected area. On April 18, 2008, the British Columbia Ministry of the Environment announced that the federal and provincial governments would share the expense of salvaging the equipment. The equipment, which was 350 m below the surface and contained 10,000 litres of diesel fuel, was successfully recovered on May 20, 2009, by first surrounding the sunken tanker truck with a yellow container to prevent fuel loss and then raising it by crane to a floating barge.

== See also ==
- Whale watching
