= Englewood Railway =

Defunct Canadian logging railroad

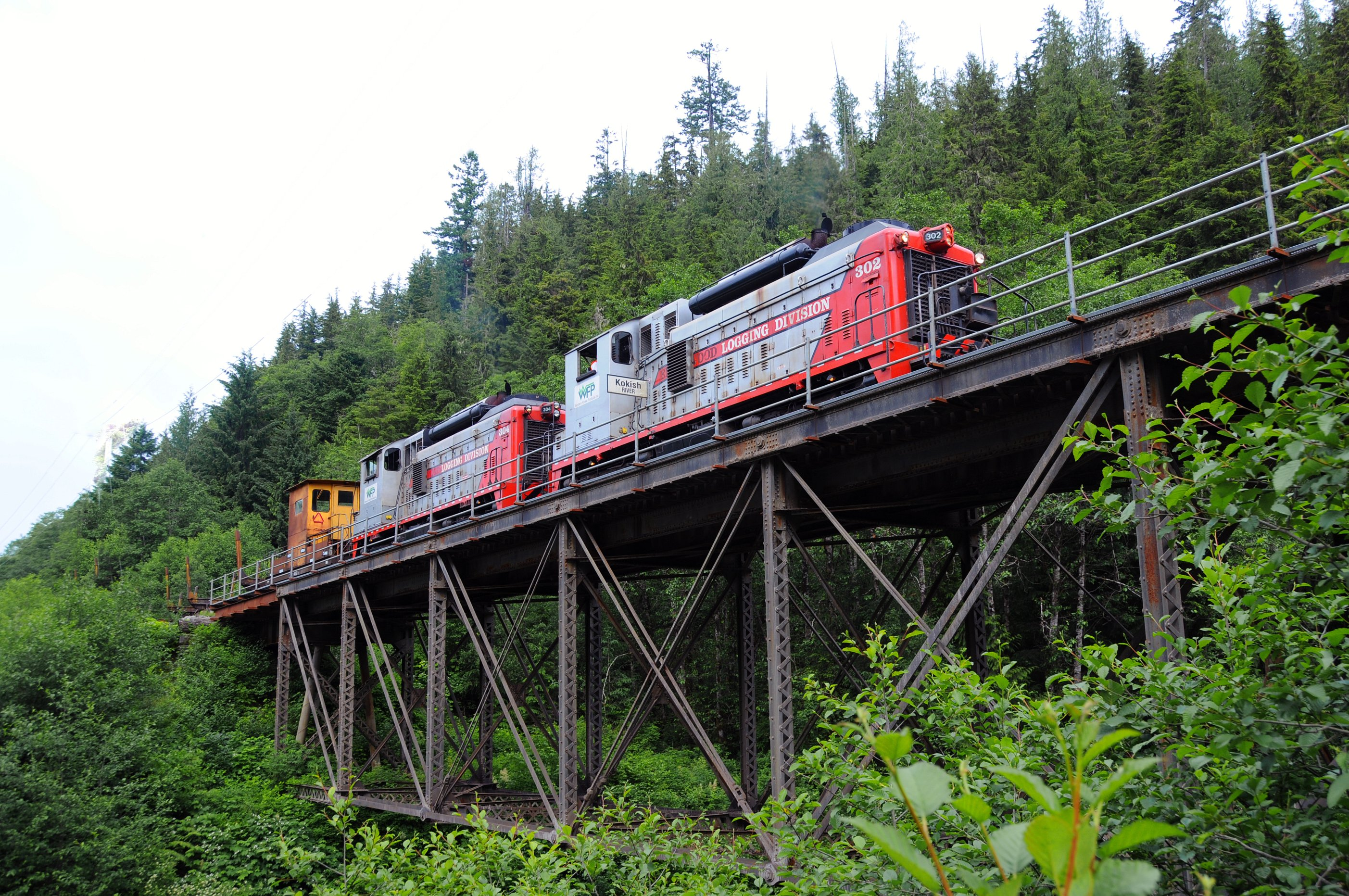
- Two EMD SW1200s lead a train south over the Kokish River.

Overview
- Headquarters: Woss, British Columbia
- Reporting mark: ER-WFP
- Locale: Vancouver Island, British Columbia
- Dates of operation: 1917–2017

Other
- Website: englewoodrailway.ca

Englewood Railway was a logging railroad on northern Vancouver Island, Canada. Headquartered in Woss, British Columbia, the line ran 90 km (56 mi) from Vernon Lake, through Woss, and past Nimpkish Lake Provincial Park to Beaver Cove. It was the last operating logging railroad in North America. After 100 years of use, railway operations ceased on November 7, 2017, following a deadly derailment in April of that year.

== History ==
The demand for wood products during the First World War led to the construction of a pulp mill, sawmill, shingle mill and community at Beaver Cove by Beaver Cove Lumber & Pulp Limited in 1917, which in turn brought about large-scale railway logging operations in the lower Nimpkish Valley. The active logging company was Wood & English (owned by the Nimpkish Timber Company) which established a logging camp ('Camp 8', later 'Nimpkish') and logging railway at the head of Nimpkish Lake. The logs cut from this area were hauled by an isolated logging railway, dumped into Nimpkish Lake, then towed down the lake to a reload centre where they were lifted out of the water and finally loaded onto railway cars for a short haul on a second rail line to Beaver Cove. The mill complex at Beaver Cove had a relatively short life, but in 1925 Wood & English built another sawmill across the bay from the pulp mill, and renamed the community "Englewood"—a combination of the names Wood and English. That mill ceased operation in 1941 and few signs remain of the former mills and community. After this date all logs were dumped in the Beaver Cove booming grounds for towing to mills in the Vancouver area.

In 1944 the founders of Canadian Forest Products or Canfor acquired the timber interests and logging operations in the Nimpkish Valley, which later became known as the Englewood Logging Division. By 1948, the railway had been extended 38 kilometres (24 mi) south of Nimpkish. A new logging camp was established near Woss Lake which became the headquarters and maintenance centre for the railway.

A major forest fire in 1952 and the need to salvage the burned over timber led to a further extension of the railway and establishment of the Vernon Lake logging camp and reload facility. Meanwhile, the gap between the two rail lines at Nimpkish Lake continued to exist. Recognizing that the multiple handling of logs was inefficient and costly, in 1957 Canfor built the 37-kilometre (23 mi) rail link along the east side of the lake. Englewood's logging railway line had now reached its full extent, with a 90-kilometre (56 mi) main line between Beaver Cove and Vernon and reload sites at Vernon, Maquilla, Woss, and 'Camp A'. The maintenance shops were later relocated from Woss to Nimpkish.

The railroad was purchased by Western Forest Products in 2006 and renamed Englewood Railway of Western Forest Products.

From 2002 to 2011, all the old wood trestle bridges were replaced by steel bridges. Many of the bridges have planked decks to allow logging trucks to cross them. The railway formerly used untreated ties milled locally from yellow cedar, but later made increasing use of steel ties.

In January 1995, a mudslide destroyed part of East Fork Bridge. It was repaired within 2 weeks, and no equipment was damaged or personnel injured.

On April 20, 2017, a train being re-loaded rolled down the track and crashed into a train maintenance car resulting in a derailment. The crash killed three workers and spilled a load of logs across the track. Operations on the railway were immediately halted after the incident. A faulty coupler lock on one of the cars failed to fully secure the knuckle on the coupler and caused a cut of 11 cars to uncouple from the movement. A derail failed to stop the cars after it was damaged by the lead truck of the first car, with rotten ties a contributing factor.

On November 7, 2017, almost 7 months following the deadly derailment, Western Forest Products announced the closure of the Englewood Railway stating that the logs will now be transported by truck at a lower cost and more efficient process. In June 2019, Western Forest Products announced it would be removing all 90 km (56 mi) of railway track, leaving bridges and trestles intact. This project was eventually completed in September 2020.

== Operation ==
Logs were brought from the hills, where they were cut to rail loading points at Vernon, Maquilla, Woss and 'Camp A' via logging trucks and then loaded onto rail cars. Up to 22,000 carloads were hauled per year, in 2 to 3 trains per day, although this amount was greatly reduced by the time the railroad ceased operations.

Typically, one locomotive worked the south end, handling the Vernon, Maquilla and Woss reloads, while two locomotives worked the north end (since the grades are much steeper there) including Camp A reload and Beaver Cove log sort. The trains were handed off just north of Woss at a place called Siding 4.

Typically, the north-end operation had the two locomotives (running cab forward) pulling 35-45 loaded log cars, with a caboose at the end, downhill from Siding 4 to Beaver Cove. On the return trip, the locomotives were in the lead, but the rest of the train was not turned (the caboose was immediately behind the locomotive).

== Equipment ==
Four EMD SW1200 locomotives, three of which had been rebuilt with 1,500 hp (1,100 kW) Caterpillar engines (the fourth retained its original 1,200 hp or 890 kW EMD engine and was kept in reserve) were modified with larger fuel tanks (to handle a nearly 200 km or 120 mi round trip) and with triple headlights (middle, left, right) at both ends. They were delivered from EMD with dynamic brakes in their original incarnation (an unusual feature in an SW1200) in order to cope with the long descent from Woss to tidewater at Beaver Cove. In effect, these locomotives were converted from switchers to mainline or "road" locomotives. Steam locomotive No. 113 was operational as part of a tourist railroad from 1988 until 1995. It is now on static display at the railway's shops in the town of Woss. Another steam locomotive, No. 112, has been cosmetically restored and is on static display in Beaver Cove. Logs were loaded on a mixture of logging flatcars and skeleton cars (no deck). There were about 400 cars in the fleet. Cabooses were small centre-cab designs with flat deck at both ends. Three speeders dating from the 1950s were used for track maintenance.
