= Beaver Cove, Newfoundland and Labrador =

Beaver Cove is the name of several places in Newfoundland and Labrador:

- Beaver Cove was a community that changed its name to Beaverton in 1968.
- Beaver Cove was a hamlet located in St. Barbe.
- Beaver Cove was a hamlet on Chimney Bay.
- Beaver Cove was a small fishing settlement on Green Bay. It had a population of 50 in 1911.
- Beaver Cove was a very small place in Fogo in 1864.
- Beaver Cove was a postal village, fishing and farming settlement located northeast of Gander. Codfish, herring, lobster, salmon and trout were the main industries. It had a population of 96 in 1911.

== See also ==
- List of unincorporated communities in Newfoundland and Labrador
