= Woss Lake Provincial Park =

Provincial park in British Columbia, Canada

- IUCN category II (national park)
- Location within Vancouver Island Location within British Columbia
- Interactive map of Woss Lake Provincial Park
- Location: British Columbia, Canada
- Nearest city: Woss
- Coordinates: 50°6′5″N 126°37′14″W
- Area: 66.34 km^{2} (25.61 sq mi)
- Established: 1995
- Governing body: BC Parks

Woss Lake Provincial Park is a provincial park in British Columbia, Canada, located 75 kilometres southeast of Port McNeill, near the community of Woss, which is also known as Woss Lake.

== History ==
The park was established 1995.

== Geography ==
The park is 66.34 km^{2}. The park landscape includes the southern portion of Woss Lake, as well as very steep forested slopes above the lake and the permanent snowfields and north facing slopes of Rugged Mountain, part of the Haihte Range.

== Conservation ==
Woss Lake Provincial Park is a very steep, forested, seldom visited wilderness area. The park contains Roosevelt elk populations, a salmon fishery and potentially, habitat for the endangered Vancouver Island marmot. The park also contains a nameless, intact secondary watershed of 16 km^{2} that drains into the head of Woss Lake. This unnamed drainage contains valuable Chinook salmon and steelhead spawning habitat and a sensitive delta area with a variety of rare plant species.

== Recreation ==
There are no recreation facilities in Woss Lake Provincial Park, but visitors with a boat, canoe or kayak can enjoy various activities ranging from backcountry hiking, skiing and mountaineering to camping, fishing, First Nations and nature appreciation and hunting.

== See also ==
- List of British Columbia Provincial Parks
- List of Canadian provincial parks
