= Woss Mountain =

British Columbian Vancouver Island mountain

- Location within Vancouver Island Location within British Columbia
- Interactive map of Woss Mountain

Highest point
- Elevation: 1,593 m (5,226 ft)
- Prominence: 588 m (1,929 ft)
- Coordinates: 50°03′34.9″N 126°33′37.1″W

Geography
- Location: Vancouver Island, British Columbia, Canada
- District: Rupert Land District
- Parent range: Vancouver Island Ranges
- Topo map: NTS 92L2 Woss Lake

Woss Mountain is a mountain on Vancouver Island, British Columbia, Canada, located 17 km (11 mi) south of Woss and 8 km (5 mi) north of Mount McKelvie.

== See also ==
- List of mountains in Canada
