= Poett Nook =

- Location of Poett Nook in British Columbia
- Coordinates: 48°52′48″N 125°2′57″W
- Country: Canada
- Province: British Columbia
- Area codes: 250, 778

Poett Nook, British Columbia is a small cove located on the West Coast of Vancouver Island. It is on the south side of Numukamis Bay, on the east side of Barkley Sound, in the Barclay Land District. Captain Richards named this location for Dr Poett, a physician from San Francisco who had an interest in copper claims on Copper Island.
