= Inglewood (Harrisonburg, Virginia) =

Historic house in Virginia, United States

- U.S. National Register of Historic Places
- Virginia Landmarks Register
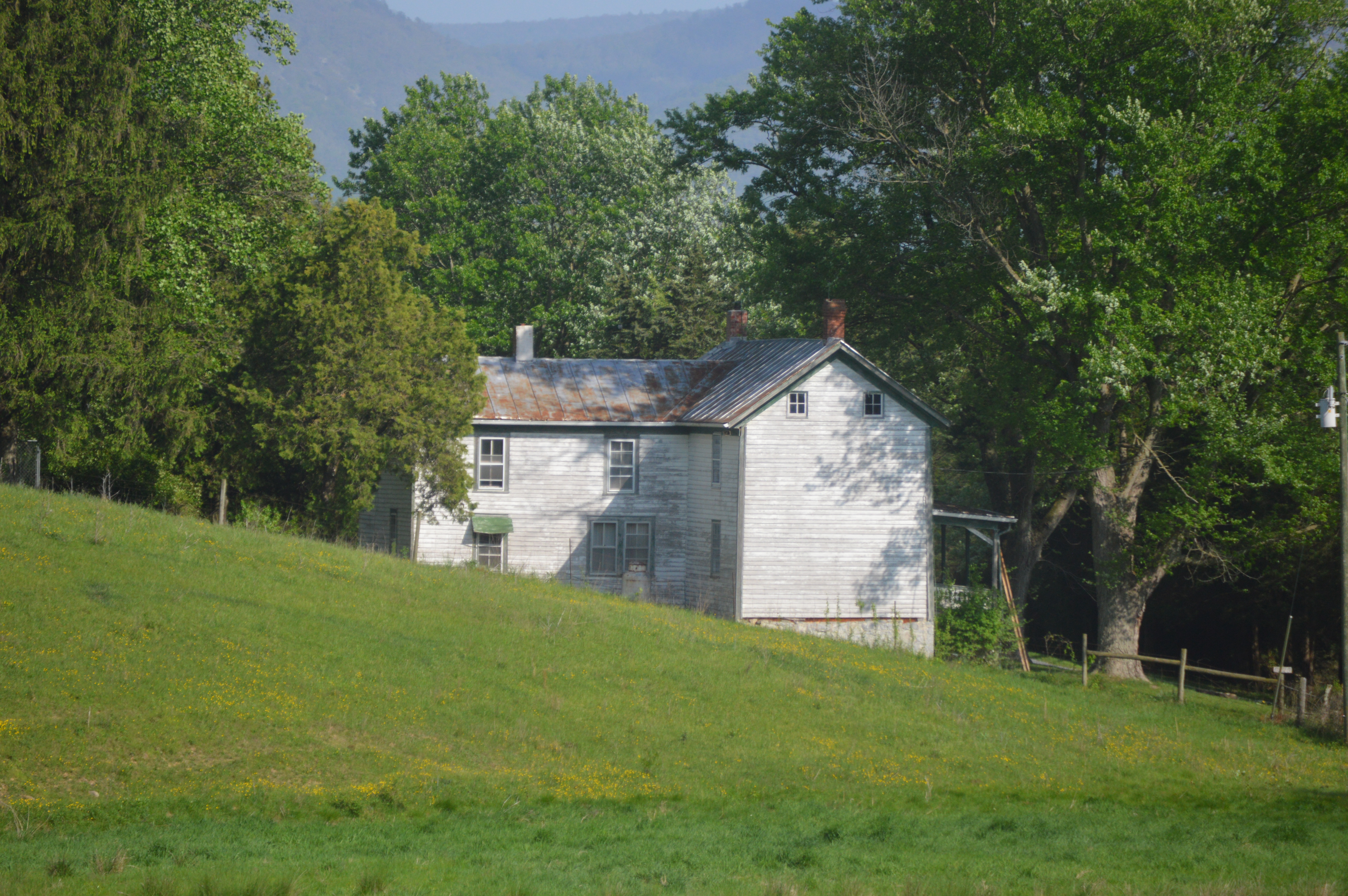
- Roadside view from the west

- Location within Virginia Location within the United States
- Location: Kratzler Road, northeast of Harrisonburg, Virginia
- Coordinates: 38°28′48″N 78°50′53″W
- Area: 44 acres (18 ha)
- Built: 1849-1851
- Architectural style: Georgian
- NRHP reference No.: 85001172
- VLR No.: 082-0051

Significant dates
- Added to NRHP: May 30, 1985
- Designated VLR: May 17, 1985

Inglewood, also known as the Robert Gray House, is a historic home located near Harrisonburg, Rockingham County, Virginia. It was built between 1849 and 1851, and is a two-story, five-bay, double pile brick Georgian style dwelling. It has a side gable roof and interior end chimneys. The house was restored in the 1940s. Also on the property are a contributing two-story, three-bay rectangular frame cabin, reportedly used as a schoolhouse, and a mid- to late 19th-century creamery.

It was listed on the National Register of Historic Places in 1985.
