= Telegraph Cove =

Community in British Columbia, Canada

Coordinates: 50.545836°N 126.83321°W

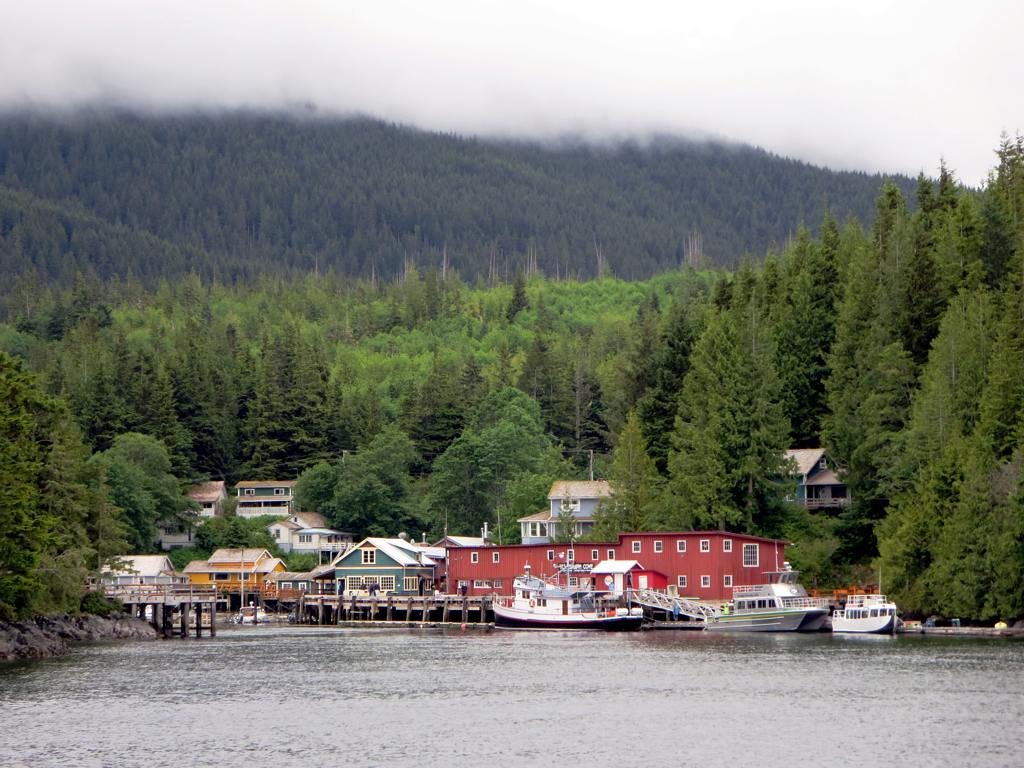
Telegraph Cove taken from Johnstone Strait

Telegraph Cove is a community of about 20 inhabitants, on Vancouver Island in British Columbia, Canada, located approximately 210 kilometres (130 mi) northwest of Campbell River. It is a former milling and cannery village that has become a launch point for eco-tourism. It is three kilometers southeast of Beaver Cove.

The community grew out of a one-room station at the northern terminus of the Campbell River telegraph line built by the federal government in 1911–12.

On the hillside above the boat shed at the entrance to the Cove stands the home of community pioneer Fred Wastell, whose father purchased most of the land around the cove. Together with Japanese investors, he established a chum salmon saltery and a small sawmill that operated well into the 1980s.

== Economy ==
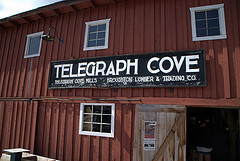
Entrance at the pier

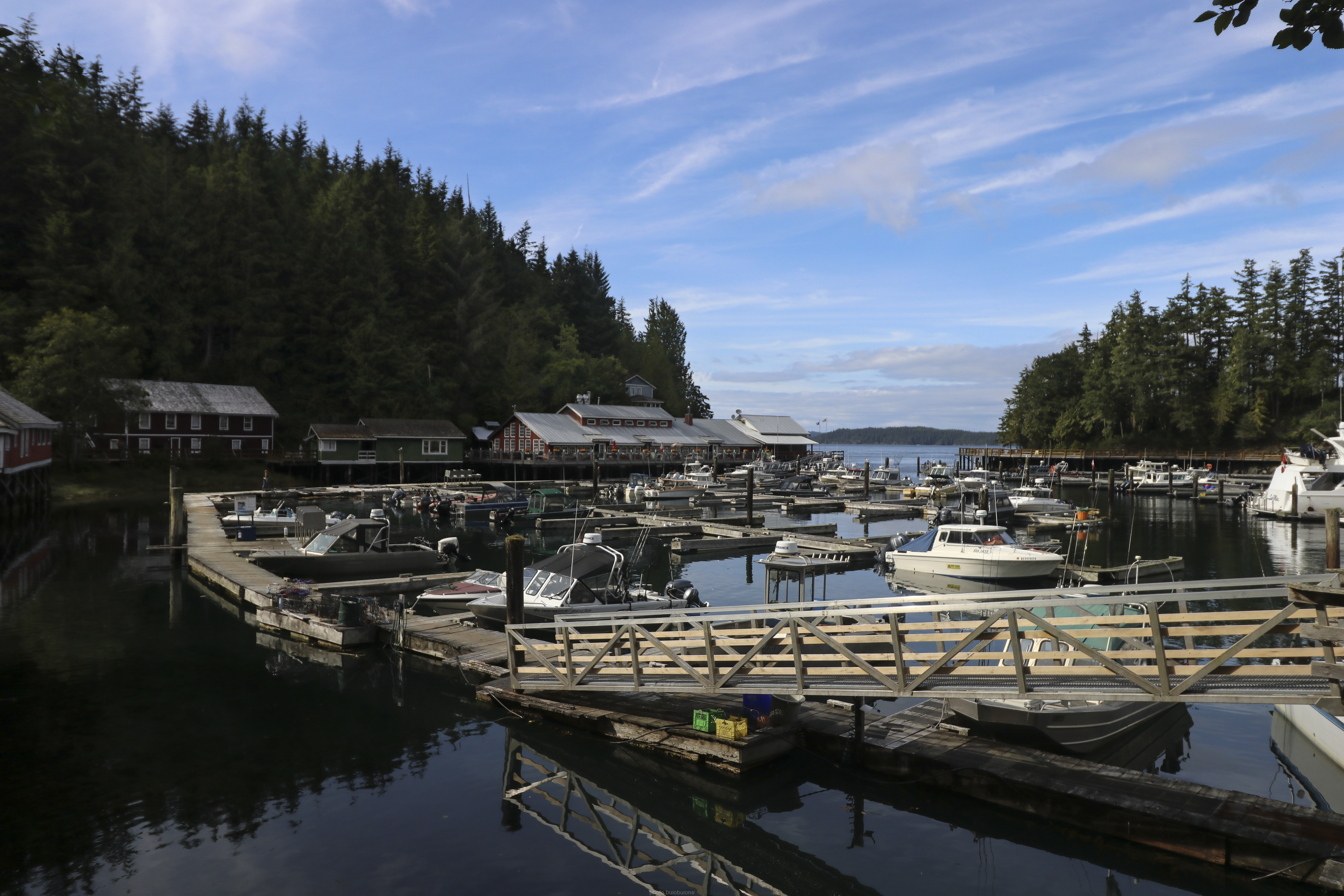
Telegraph Cove

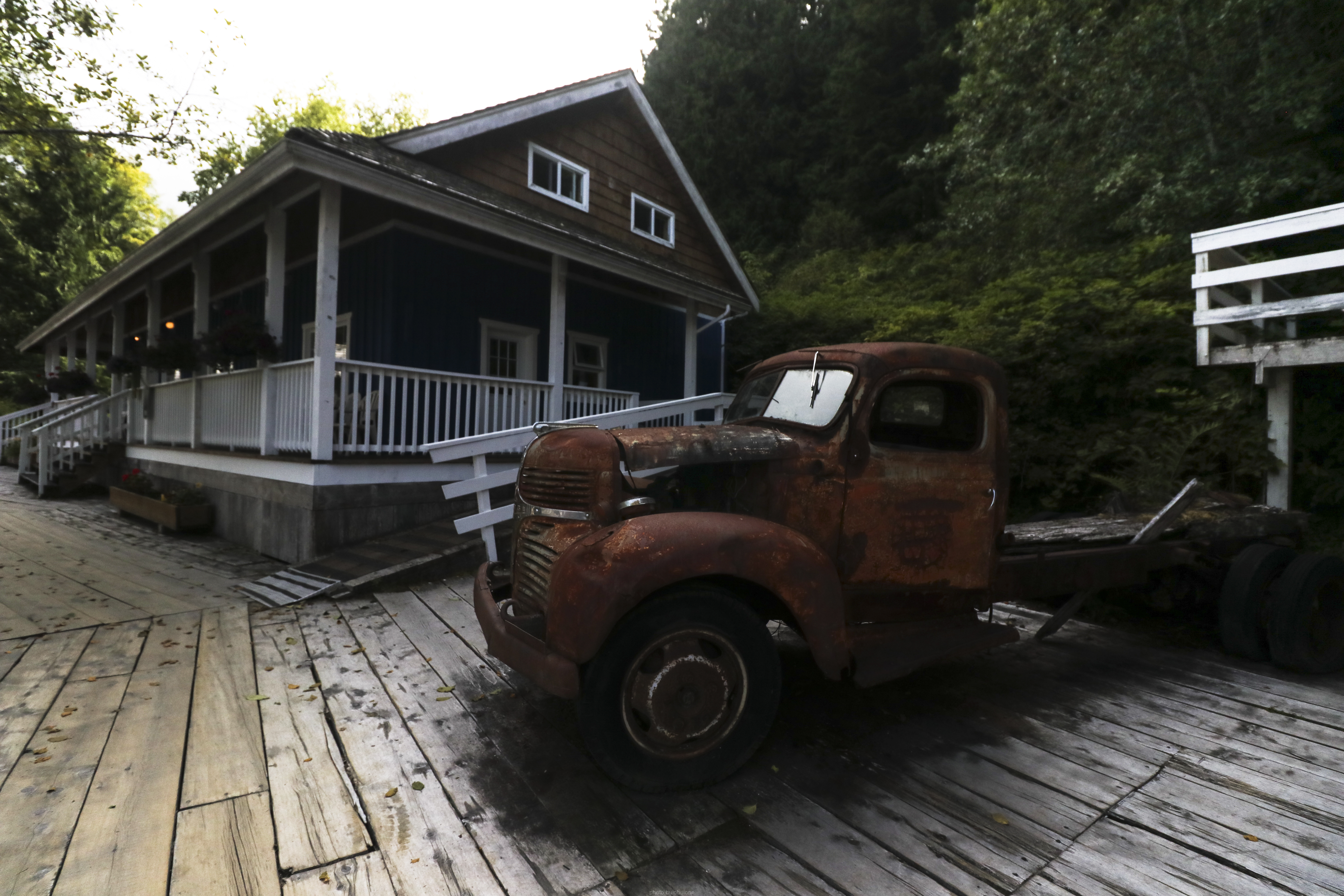
Telegraph Cove

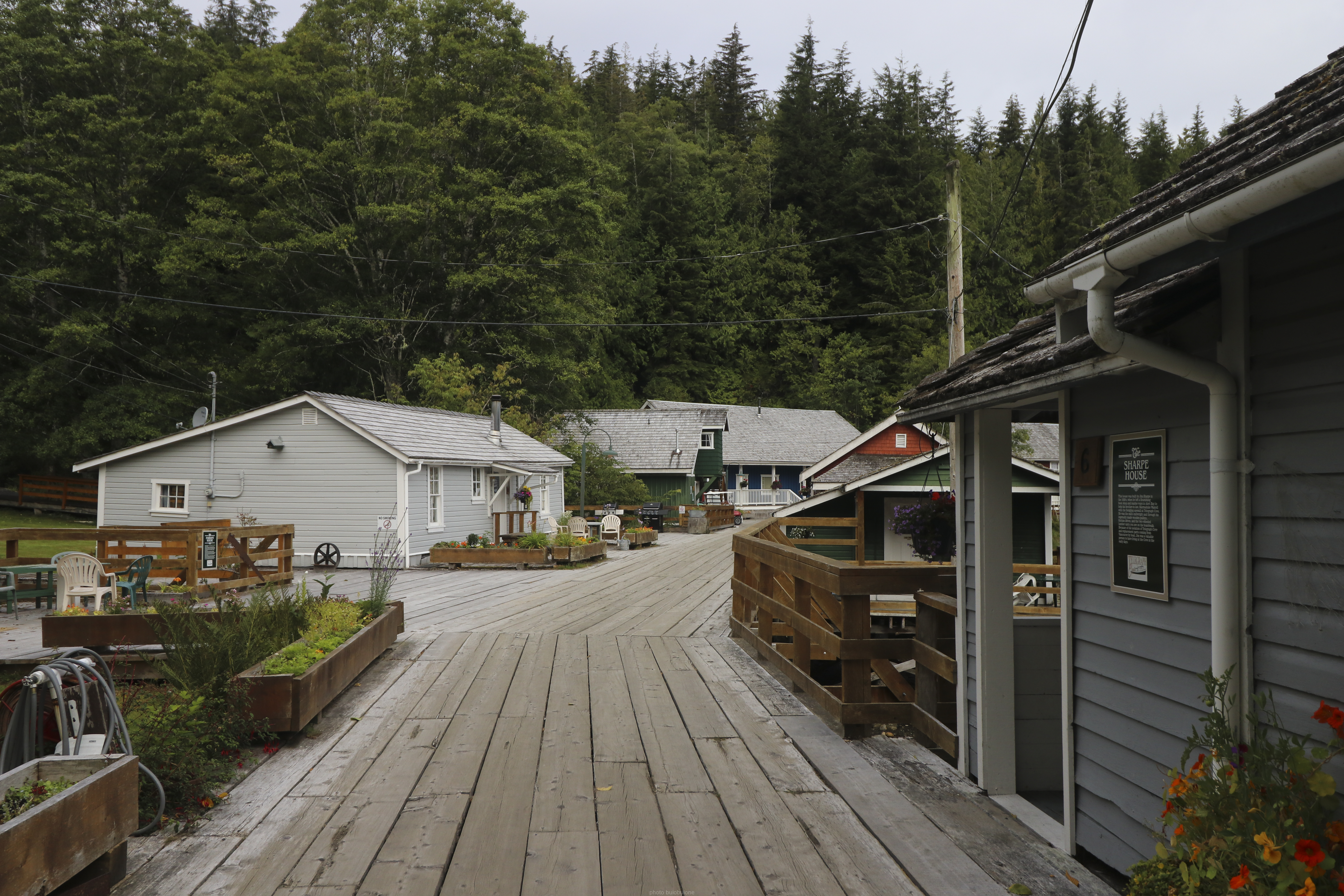
Telegraph Cove

Today, Telegraph Cove's economy is based primarily on tourism due to its prime location on Johnstone Strait and its proximity to Robson Bight ecological reserve. Telegraph Cove serves as the send-off point for kayakers and other whale-watchers who are interested in sightings of the large number of orca whales that spend the summer months in Johnstone Strait, which separates the northern part of Vancouver Island from the rest of British Columbia.

The old mill village of Telegraph Cove has been turned into a resort (Telegraph Cove Resort), where numerous small businesses head up operations that take tourists into Johnstone Strait. Stubbs Island Charters (Telegraph Cove Whale Watch) helped put the cove on the whale watching world's radar for nearly 40 years.

Telegraph Cove Resort is owned and operated by The Graham family. This includes the boardwalk and all heritage buildings, North Marina and boat launch, and the Forest Campground.

Telegraph Cove Marina and RV Park is also located at Telegraph Cove and is owned by Telegraph Cove Holdings (TCH). Since 1991, TCH has owned 127 hectares in and surrounding Telegraph Cove excluding the old village of Telegraph Cove and excluding Telegraph Cove Resort's marina and RV park. The Telegraph Point strata subdivision is located across the cove from the historic village, and will ultimately consist of sixty-six residential homesites and six commercial sites located directly on the cove designed to match the character of the historic old town. In 2020 the first three phases of residential homesites (24 lots) have been marketed and sold and there are nine houses at Telegraph Point with new homes built every year.

== Improvements ==
In the summer of 2006, the Telegraph Cove Road improvement project was completed, bringing a widened, realigned, and paved road all the way to Telegraph Cove. Formerly, the only way in to the Cove by car was by a gravel road from Beaver Cove where there was ferry service down-island to Kelsey Bay.

Telegraph Cove Marina's 130 slip marina underwent a complete rebuild in 2007/2008 and has moorage for small and large vessels with potable water and power. Both Telegraph Cove Marina and Telegraph Cove Resorts' marina primarily cater to trailerable boats.

Telegraph Cove Resort has one slip available for 100+ foot yachts, while Telegraph cove Marina has moorage for boats up to 68 feet (21 m) and 8 commercial moorage slips for vessels 40–60 feet.

== 2024 Fire ==
On the Evening on December 31, 2024, A large fire started on the north end of the Boardwalk. The fire quickly spread and consumed the Old Saltery Pub, The Killer Whale Cafe, Tide Rip Tours office, Prince of Whales office, one heritage house and the Whale Interpretive Centre along with a large portion of the boardwalk. Fire Departments from Port McNeil, Hyde Creek, Port Hardy, Sointula and Alert Bay responded to the fire
