= Beaver Cove, British Columbia =

Beaver Cove
- Community
- Location within British Columbia
- Coordinates: 50.535°N 126.857°W
- Country: Canada
- Province: British Columbia
- Time zone: UTC−07:00 (PT)

Beaver Cove is a small coastal community on Northern Vancouver Island, Canada, located on the cove of the same name. It is located at the mouth of the Kokish River, 18 km (11 mi) southeast of Port McNeill and 3 km (2 mi) up the inlet from Telegraph Cove.

== Background ==
It is the northern terminus of the Englewood Railway, which is named after the Wood & English Logging Company, whose former logging camp, now abandoned, was Englewood, on the other side of Beaver Cove from today's community. Also nearby, to the northeast on the southeast shore of Beaver Cove, is the community of Kokish.
