= Woss =

- Designated place
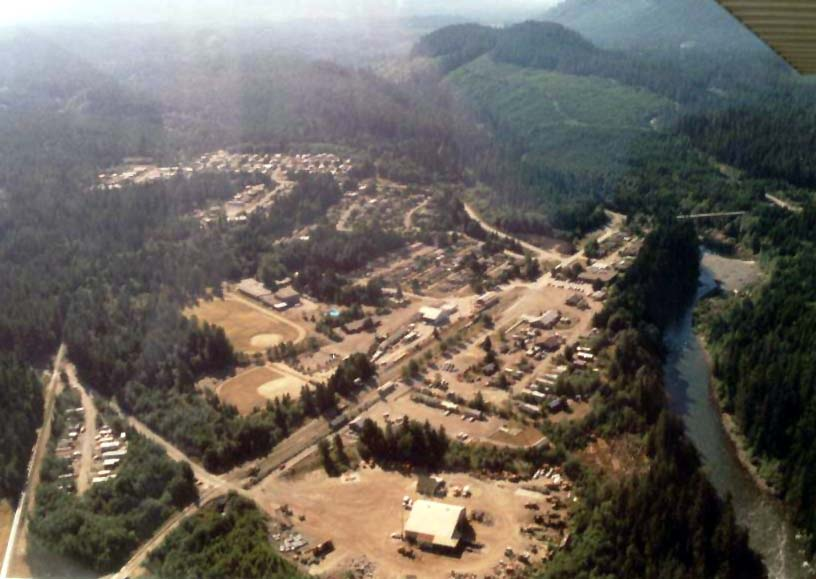
- Aerial view of Woss

- Location of Woss in British Columbia Woss (British Columbia)
- Coordinates: 50°12′41″N 126°35′55″W
- Country: Canada
- Province: British Columbia
- Regional District: Mount Waddington

Area
  - Total: 1.48 km^{2} (0.57 sq mi)

Population (2016)
  - Total: 189
  - Density: 128/km^{2} (331/sq mi)
- Time zone: UTC−07:00 (PT)

Woss, also commonly known as Woss Lake after the nearby lake of the same name, is a small village in the Nimpkish Valley, located 75 km (47 mi) southeast of Port McNeill and 128 km (80 mi) north of Campbell River on Highway 19, in northeastern Vancouver Island, British Columbia, Canada. The estimated population of Woss and the Nimpkish Valley is 200. The town of Woss lies about 3 km north of Woss Lake, a long, narrow lake stretching about 10 km in a primarily north–south direction with a maximum width of about one km, the southern portion of which is part of Woss Lake Provincial Park.

Woss is a member municipality of the Regional District of Mount Waddington, which also includes Alert Bay, Port Alice, Port McNeill, Hyde Creek, Coal Harbour, Holberg, Malcolm Island, Quatsino and Port Hardy. Woss has regular telephone service, and acquired cellular phone services in early 2016. Woss had one elementary school for many years, that was closed up after its 2015–2016 school year.

Until the mid-1960s, Woss was accessible only by rail from Beaver Cove on the Englewood Railway. During this time, most of the loggers were housed in bunkhouses heated with wood-fired steam. One of the original steam powered locomotives is currently used as a working tourist attraction. Nearby Woss Lake is the main summer recreational playground for Woss residents and the original community campground at the lake is now Woss Lake Provincial Park.

Tage Wickstrom, the school principal until his death in 1986, built the only 440 dirt oval track and field on the north island at his school in Woss. For many years Woss Lake School hosted all of the track and field competitions for School District #85 which included communities from Woss to Port Hardy. The track and field are now known as the "Tage Wickstrom Track and Field" in honour of the educator who built them.

== Geology ==
Woss is on the dividing line between a pluton of Jurassic granodiorite and a mass of Triassic basalt; mountains to the north are basaltic while ranges to the west, south and east are mostly granitic. Surficial deposits in the community are coarse with abundant gravel and stones.

== Climate ==
According to the Köppen climate classification, Woss experiences a temperate maritime or oceanic climate (Cfb), giving the area warm, dry summers and mild, wet winters. Despite Woss having a temperate climate, summer temperatures often exceed 30 °C (86 °F) on average 15–25 days. This is due to the community's inland location near the widest region of Vancouver Island, giving the community its own microclimate. As a result of the community being surrounded by mountain ranges, adiabatic heating occurs. This causes peak summer temperatures throughout July and August to occasionally exceed 35 °C (95 °F), sometimes even approach 40 °C (104 °F). Winters are relatively short, mild, and wet. The average day-time high in winter sits between 4 and 12 °C (39 and 54 °F). The most precipitation occurs in the month of November averaging around 350 millimeters (13.75 in). Snowfall most commonly occurs in late February and early March. However, snow on the ground is usually short-lived.

Up until the 2021 Western North America heat wave, the hottest recorded temperature for the community was 42.1 °C (107.8 °F) on July 30, 2009. This was beaten twice during the June 2021 heat wave before eventually topping off at 44.1 °C (111.4 °F) on June 28, 2021, two degrees Celsius warmer. The coldest recorded temperature occurred in late January 1980, plummeting to nearly -20 °C (-4 °F).

== See also ==
- Woss Mountain
