= Area codes 778, 236, 672, and 257 =

Area codes in British Columbia, Canada

Coordinates: 54°N 124°W

Area codes 778, 236, 672, and 257 are telephone overlay area codes in the North American Numbering Plan (NANP) for the Canadian province of British Columbia. They overlay area code 604, which serves a small southwestern section, the Lower Mainland, of the province (including Vancouver), and area code 250, which serves the rest of the province.

The area codes also serve the small United States community of Hyder, Alaska, which is located along the Canada–United States border near the town of Stewart.

== History ==
Area code 604 had served as British Columbia's sole area code for 50 years since the establishment of the first continental telephone numbering plan in 1947 by the American Telephone and Telegraph Company. In 1997, area code 250 was installed for Vancouver Island and the Interior, while area code 604 was restricted to serve Vancouver and the Lower Mainland. Intended as a long-term solution, the proliferation of telephone service in the area required additional central office code relief within only four years. While telephone numbers tended to be used up fairly quickly in the immediate Vancouver area due to its rapid growth, the number allocation problem was particularly severe in the Lower Mainland, which is home to most of the province's landlines and cell phones. Area code 778 was created on November 3, 2001, as a concentrated overlay for the two largest regional districts in the Lower Mainland, Metro Vancouver and the Fraser Valley Regional District. The rest of the Lower Mainland continued to use only 604. The implementation of 778 made ten-digit dialing mandatory across the Lower Mainland.

In early 2007, the Canadian Radio-television and Telecommunications Commission (CRTC) faced the prospect that area code 250 would be exhausted in early 2008. Relief proposals included a geographic split that would have retained area code 250 for the interior of the province, with Vancouver Island switching to a new area code. An alternative was to expand area code 778 to the 250 numbering plan area, or concentrated overlays for a part of 250. The CRTC concluded that there was not enough time to implement a split before exhaustion, and the major telecom providers in the territory contended that an overlay would be far easier to implement. Telus and other carriers wanted to spare their Vancouver Island customers the expense and burden of changing telephone numbers for a second time in a decade. Accordingly, the CRTC announced on June 7, 2007, that 778 would become an overlay for the entire province effective July 4, 2007. Overlays have become the preferred method of relief in Canada, and no area codes have been split in the country since 1999.

As of June 23, 2008, ten-digit dialing became mandatory across British Columbia. After September 12, 2008, seven-digit dialing ceased to function.

Within another four years, 604, 250, and 778 were close to exhaustion again, requiring the addition of area code 236 for the province on June 1, 2013.

In 2019, area codes 604, 250, 778, and 236 were expected to reach certain exhaustion thresholds in May 2020. The CRTC ordered the introduction of a third overlay code for the province, 672, which was activated on May 4, 2019.

Area code 257 was introduced as the fourth overlay to the numbering plan area for relief on May 24, 2025.

== Communities and central office prefixes in the service area ==
- 100 Mile House (672) – 288 982; (236) – 378 593 712 977
- Abbotsford (672) – 371 588 994 998; (778) – 201 314 344 345 360 761 769 771 779 780 856 880 982; (236) – 232 233 258 380 458 483 493 602 603 605 613 622 851 887 899
- Aldergrove (672) – 890 980 985; (236) – 206 260 332 359 360 460 632 761 898; (778) – 240 241 242 243 245 246 255 369 549 551 552 556 808 809 823 825 878 908
- Boston Bar (672) – 891; (236) – 207 261 901
- Bowen Island (672) – 892; (236) – 208 357 902
- Britannia Beach (672) – 893; (236) – 210 262 770
- Cache Creek (672) – 202; (778) – 207; (236) – 223
- Campbell River (778) – 346 420 560; (236) – 472 507 854
- Castlegar: (778) – 364 460 633; (236) – 698
- Chilliwack (778) – 539 596 860 933; (236) – 436 522 615 804 892
- Cobble Hill (672) – 365; (236) – 844 912
- Comox (778) – 431 541 585 992; (236) – 269 517 793
- Cortes Island (672) – 366; (236) – 845 918
- Courtenay (778) – 225 335 451 585 647; (236) – 255 337 489 655
- Cranbrook (672) – 987 988 989 990; (236) – 302 303 363 486 490 505 703; (778) – 261 450 517 520 550 570 761 963
- Dawson Creek (778) – 273 299 595 843 864 964; (236) – 704
- Delta (778) – 264
- Duncan (236) – 285 594 800 801 864; (778) – 422 455 493 568 936
- Fernie (778) – 519; (236) – 526 692 705
- Fort Langley (672) – 885; (236) – 316 451
- Fort Nelson (778) – 463 553 744
- Fulford Harbour (672) – 367 875; (236) – 913
- Ganges (672) – 368 874 984; (236) – 241 914
- Gitlaxt'aamiks (672) – 978
- Gold River (672) – 369; (236) – 846 919
- Gulf Islands (672) – 882; (236) – 549 681 823 824 920
- Haney (672) – 880; (236) – 318 468 890
- Holberg (672) – 217 873; (236) – 921
- Houston (778) – 221 642 816; (236) – 673 742
- Hudson's Hope (778) – 204; (236) – 369
- Invermere (778) – 526; (236) – 527 694
- Jordan River (672) – 218 872; (236) – 915
- Kamloops (236) – 252 313 425 546 565 597 852; (778) – 220 257 376 390 399 470 471 495 538 586 696 765
- Kaslo (778) – 205; (236) – 287
- Kelowna (672) – 580 969 986 993; (236) – 338 361 420 457 492 499 588 595 633 763 766 795 822 970 974; (778) – 214 215 313 363 380 392 436 477 478 484 581 583 594 699 721 738 760 821 940 946
- Kimberley (778) – 481; (236) – 510 528 695
- Kitimat (778) – 631 649 818 876; (236) – 674
- Kitwanga (672) – 644; (236) – 745
- Ladner (672) – 889; (236) – 376 452 891
- Langley (778) – 277 278 298 366 609 726 826; (236) – 325 377 473
- Lillooet (672) – 784; (236) – 225 417 445
- Maple Ridge (672)
- Nakusp (778) – 206; (236) – 288 697
- Nanaimo (778) – 268 269 441 690 762 787 841 971; (236) – 238 362 462 496 544 628 897 953
- New Westminster (672) – 722; (778) – 237 238 312 384 385 386 387 388 389 396 397 398 503 688 727 759 772 773 775 789 791 792 801 822 827 858 859 861 862 863 865 869 885 889 891 892 893 895 896 898 907 935 937 979; (236) – 416 428 453 545 880 881 883 900 975
- North Kamloops (672) – 991; (236) – 379 421
- North Vancouver (672) – 333; (778) – 251 262 264 338 340 729 802 820; (236) – 304 465 481 551 636 646
- Ocean Falls (672) – 219 871; (236) – 922
- Parksville (778) — 842
- Pender Island (672) – 220; (236) – 847 923 944
- Penticton (236) – 422 498 500 687 700 853; (778) – 476 559 622 646 781 931
- Pineview (672) – 577
- Pitt Meadows (672) – 894; (236) – 324 626 771
- Port Alberni (778) – 419 421 449 925
- Port Alice (672) – 786; (236) – 848 924
- Port Coquitlam (672) – 886; (778) – 216 284 285 325 730 831 941; (236) – 552 606 947
- Port Hardy (672) – 787; (236) – 319 641 849 925
- Port Moody (672) – 877; (778) – 217 272 355 522 731; (236) – 306 553 879
- Port Renfrew (672) – 788; (236) – 926
- Powell River (778) – 236 758; (236) – 327
- Prince George (672) – 983 996 997; (236) – 331 423 494 550 601 612 765 792; (778) – 281 349 415 416 497 510 675 693 763 764 890 983
- Prince Rupert (778) – 361 645; (236) – 585
- Quesnel (236) – 301 424 587 70 713 799; (778) – 334 414 466 768 920
- Red Rock (672) – 992; (236) – 404
- Richmond (672) – 772; (236) – 235 245 246 266 305 454 616; (778) – 219 234 282 295 296 297 723 732 803 804 832 918 919 960;
- Radium Hot Springs (778) – 527; (236) – 529
- Saanich (672) – 883; (778) – 351 426 749 750; (236) – 653 682 916 946
- Sechelt (672) – 981; (236) – 647
- Smithers (778) – 210 640 648; (236) – 675
- Sooke (672) – 884; (778) – 352 425; (236) – 683 917 948
- South Delta (778) – 263
- Sparwood (672) – 388 (778) – 518; (236) – 531 696 710
- Squamish (672) – 895 906; (236) – 676 772
- Surrey is divided into the following local rate centres:
  - Cloverdale (672) – 881; (778) – 571 574 575 850; (236) – 256 450 456
  - Newton (672) – 878; (236) – 263 418 592 598; (778) – 218 223 438 563 564 565 578 590 591 593 612 830 986
  - Whalley (672) – 876; (778) – 290 293 368 391 394 395 435 636 735 852; (236) – 474 756
  - White Rock (672) – 896 (236) – 265 502 547 876; (778) – 291 292 294 390 545 736
- Vanderhoof (672) – 645; (236) – 409 658
- Winter Harbour (672) – 790 868; (236) – 928
- Tahsis (672) – 789 869 979; (236) – 927
- Trail (778) – 274 367 456 965; (236) – 968
- Vancouver (672) – 202 222 444 513 514 515 666 887 888 976 999; (236) – 200 202 247 259 268 298 299 308 312 315 317 326 330 333 334 335 339 412 427 429 444 446 447 448 449 455 466 471 476 477 497 480 482 484 485 495 501 509 512 513 514 515 516 518 520 521 556 558 559 591 607 608 609 666 668 677 688 699 755 757 775 776 777 779 780 781 782 783 784 788 808 818 826 828 833 850 855 858 862 863 865 866 867 868 869 877 878 885 886 888 889 955 965 966 967 971 976 978 979 980 981 982 983 984 985 986 987 988 989 990 991 992 993 994 995 996 997 998 999; (778) – 200 222 224 227 228 229 230 231 232 233 235 239 288 300 302 309 316 317 318 319 320 321 322 323 327 328 329 330 331 333 370 371 372 373 374 375 377 378 379 381 383 446 452 504 532 554 558 580 588 600 628 668 680 681 682 683 684 686 689 706 707 708 710 712 713 714 724 737 782 783 785 786 788 800 807 819 828 829 833 834 835 836 837 838 839 840 845 846 847 848 849 854 855 857 866 867 868 870 871 872 873 874 875 877 879 881 882 883 886 887 888 889 891 893 897 899 903 904 905 923 926 927 928 929 938 939 944 945 952 953 954 955 956 968 976 980 984 985 987 988 989 990 991 992 993 994 995 996 997 998 999
- Vernon (236) – 426 497 599 600 768 873; (778) – 212 475 506 790 930 932
- Victoria (672) – 995; (236) – 237 239 240 336 464 470 475 478 491 508 562 638 758 882 896 969; (778) – 224 265 350 400 401 405 406 410 430 432 433 440 445 533 535 557 584 587 600 676 677 678 679 698 700 746 747 817 966 967 972 977
- West Vancouver (672) – 777; (236) – 264 323 506 663 706 707 708; (778) – 279 280 734 805 851
- Westwold (236) – 231
- Whonnock (672) – 897; (236) – 267 461 503 906
- Williams Lake (236) – 300 307 433 802; (778) – 267 333 412 417 567 799 961

== See also ==
- List of North American Numbering Plan area codes

British Columbia area codes: 250, 604, 236/257/672/778
	North: 867	
West: Pacific Ocean, 907	236/257/672/778, 250, 604	East: 780, 403, 587/825/368
	South: 360/564, 509, 208/986, 406	
Alberta area codes: 403, 587/825/368, 780
Yukon, Northwest Territories and Nunavut area codes: 867
Idaho area codes: 208/986
Washington area codes: 206, 253, 360, 425, 509, 564
Alaska area codes: 907
