= Area code 250 =

Telephone area code in British Columbia, Canada

Coordinates: 54°0′0″N 124°0′0″W

Area code 250 is a telephone area code in the North American Numbering Plan (NANP) for the Canadian province of British Columbia outside the Lower Mainland, including Vancouver Island – home to the provincial capital, Victoria – and the province's Interior region. In addition, the numbering plan area extends into the United States community of Hyder, Alaska, located along the Canada–United States border near the town of Stewart. The incumbent local exchange carriers that service the area code are Telus, Northwestel, and CityWest in the city of Prince Rupert.

The area code is one of the two parents, along with area code 604, of an overlay complex with area codes 778, 236, 672, and 257 that extends to the entire province.

== History ==
British Columbia was designated a single numbering plan area in 1947, when the American Telephone and Telegraph Company (AT&T) devised the first continental telephone numbering plan, and assigned the area code 604. This remained in place for almost half a century.

On October 19, 1996, the numbering plan area was divided in an area code split in which the Lower Mainland retained the existing area code, while the rest was identified with new area code 250.

By the middle of the first decade of the 2000s, 250 came under the threat of exhaustion of central office prefixes again, particularly due to growth on Vancouver Island and in the larger cities of the interior. Amid projections that 250 would be exhausted by January 2008, the Canadian Radio-Television and Telecommunications Commission began considering relief options in early 2007. Proposals included:

- a geographic split that would have left 250 with the interior and switched Vancouver Island to a new area code
- expanding area code 778, previously a concentrated overlay for Metro Vancouver and the Fraser Valley, to the 250 territory
- concentrated overlays for part of the 250 territory

Several of the major landline and wireless providers in the 250 territory strongly favoured an overlay and stated that it would be easier to implement than a split. They also wanted to spare themselves and their customers the expense and burden of changing their numbers, which would have required a massive reprogramming of cell phones. The proposal for a split would have forced Vancouver Island's residents to change their numbers for a second time in a decade.

The CRTC announced on June 7, 2007, that 778 would be expanded to become an overlay for the entire province starting that July 4. On that date, exchanges in 778 became available to Vancouver Island and interior residents, and a permissive dialling period began across British Columbia during which it was possible to make local calls with either seven or ten digits. Three CO prefixes in the 250 area code were reserved for use by Northwestel, as 13 of its 15 switches could not then handle multiple area codes, and its system could not accommodate ten-digit-dialling.

The CRTC decided on an overlay after concluding that there was not enough time to implement a split before 250 was due to exhaust in January 2008. Effective June 23, 2008, ten-digit dialling became mandatory throughout the entire province, and attempts to make a seven-digit call triggered an intercept message with a reminder of the new rule. After September 12, 2008, seven-digit dialling no longer functioned. Overlays have become the preferred method of area code relief in Canada, as they are an easy workaround for the number allocation problem, as opposed to a split plan.

On June 1, 2013, area code 236 was implemented as a distributed overlay of area codes 250, 604, and 778 and was expected to be exhausted by May 2020. As a result, area code 672 was implemented on May 4, 2019, as an additional distributed overlay to relieve area codes 250, 604, 778, and 236.

== Service area and central office codes ==
- 100 Mile House: 395 456 593 396 706
- Ahousaht: 670
- Alert Bay: 403 974
- Armstrong: 546
- Bamfield: 728
- Beaver Cove: 928
- Beaverdell: 484
- Bella Bella: 957
- Bralorne: see Bridge River Valley
- Brexton: see Bridge River Valley
- Bridge River Valley: 238
- Campbell River: 201 202 203 204 205 286 287 346 504 830 850 895 923 926
- Castlegar: 304 365 608 687
- Chetwynd: 788
- Christina Lake: 447
- Cranbrook: 417 420 421 426 450 464 489 581 919
- Creston: 254 402 428 431 435 977
- Comox: 339 890 941
- Cortes Island: 935
- Courtenay: 207 218 331 334 338 465 585 650 702 703 792 871 897 898
- The Cowichan Valley is divided into the following local rate centres:
  - Chemainus: 210 246 324 416 436 533 606
  - Cobble Hill: 733 743 929
  - Duncan: 252 466 510 597 701 709 710 715 732 737 746 748 815 856
  - Ladysmith: 245 912 924
  - Lake Cowichan: 749 932
  - Youbou: 745
- Cumberland: 336
- Dawson Creek: 219 467 719 782 784 795 806 854
- Denman Island: see Union Bay
- Elkford: 865
- Enderby: 838
- Fanny Bay: see Union Bay
- Fernie: 278 430 946
- Fort Nelson: 774
- Fort St. James: 996
- Fort St. John: 224 261 262 263 264 271 329 663 785 787 793 794
- Fruitvale: 367
- Gabriola Island: 247 325
- Galiano Island: see Gulf Islands
- Gold Bridge: see Bridge River Valley
- Gold River: 283
- Golden: 272 344 439
- Grand Forks: 442 443 584 666
- Greenwood: 445
- Gulf Islands: 222 539
- Gun Lake: see Bridge River Valley
- Hazelton: 842
- Hixon: 998
- Holberg: 288
- Hornby Island: see Union Bay
- Houston: 845
- Hudson's Hope: 783 903
- Hyder, Alaska: 234 636
- Invermere: 270 341 342 409 688
- Jordan River: 646
- Kamloops is divided into the following local rate centres:
  - Chase: 679
  - Barriere: 672
  - Clearwater: 674
  - Cache Creek: 313 457
  - Kamloops 214 299 312 314 318 319 320 371 372 374 376 377 434 461 554 571 572 573 574 576 578 579 682 705 819 828 851 852 879
  - Logan Lake: 523
  - Savona: 373
- Kaslo: 353 943
- Kelowna is divided into the following local rate centres:
  - Kelowna: 212 215 258 300 317 322 448 450 451 452 454 469 470 491 575 681 712 717 718 762 763 764 765 769 801 807 808 826 859 860 861 862 863 864 868 869 870 872 878 899 979 980
  - Oyama: 548
  - Peachland: 767
  - West Kelowna: 700 707 768
  - Winfield: 766
- Kimberley: 427 432 520 602 908
- Kitimat: 632 639
- Kitwanga: 849
- Rural Kootenays: 229 357 399 424 429 529 603 829
- Kyuquot: 332
- Lasqueti Island: 333
- Lillooet: 256
- Lytton: 455
- Mackenzie: 997
- Mayne Island: see Gulf Islands
- Merritt: 280 315 378 525 936
- Midway: 449 528 605
- Nakusp: 265
- Nanaimo is divided into the following local rate centres:
  - Cedar: 323 722
  - Lantzville: 390 933
  - Nanaimo: 244 255 268 327 518 585 591 616 618 619 667 668 713 714 716 734 739 740 741 753 754 755 762 796 797 802 816 824
  - Wellington: 585 729 751 756 758 760
- Nanoose Bay: 468 821
- Nelson: 352 354 505 509 551 777 825
- Oliver: 485 498
- Osoyoos: 495
- Parksville: 228 240 248 586 607 905 927 937 947 951 954
- Pender Island: 629
- Penticton: 274 276 328 460 462 482 486 487 488 490 492 493 770 809 817
- Port Alberni: 206 720 723 724 730 731 735 736 913 918
- Port Alice: 209 284 904
- Port Hardy: 230 902 949
- Port McNeill: 956
- Port Renfrew: 647
- Prince George: 277 301 552 561 562 563 564 565 596 612 613 614 617 640 645 649 906 960 961 962 963 964 970 981
- Prince Rupert: 624 627
- Quadra Island: 285
- Qualicum Beach: 594 738 752 909
- Quesnel: 249 255 316 747 925 983 985 991 992
- Revelstoke: 814 837
- Rossland: 362
- Saanich: 544 654 655 657 665 669
- Salmon Arm: 489 515 803 804 832 833
- Salt Spring Island: 537 538 653
- Saturna Island: see Gulf Islands
- Sayward: 282
- Sidney: 652 656
- Slocan Valley: 226 355 358 359
- Smithers: 847 877 917
- Sointula: 973
- Sooke: 642 664 867
- Sparwood: 425 910
- Stewart: 636
- Summerland: 404 437 494 583
- Tahsis: 934
- Terrace: 615 631 635 638 641 892 922 975
- Tofino: 522 725
- Trail: 231 364 368 512 521 693 921
- Tumbler Ridge: 242
- Ucluelet: 266 534 726
- Union Bay: 335
- Valemount: 566
- Vanderhoof: 524 567 570 944
- Vernon: 241 260 275 306 307 308 309 351 503 540 541 542 543 545 549 550 558 907 938
- Victoria: 208 213 216 217 220 294 298 310 356 360 361 363 370 380 381 382 383 384 385 386 387 388 389 391 405 410 412 413 414 415 418 419 472 474 475 477 478 479 480 483 507 508 514 516 519 532 536 580 588 589 590 592 595 598 634 658 661 686 704 708 721 727 744 800 812 813 818 823 853 857 858 880 881 882 883 884 885 886 888 889 891 893 896 915 920 940 952 953 976 978 984 995 999
- Wells: 994
- Williams Lake: 267 302 303 305 392 398 855
- Winter Harbour: 969
- Woss: 281
- Wynndel: 866
- Zeballos: 761

== See also ==
- List of North American Numbering Plan area codes

British Columbia area codes: 250, 604, 236/257/672/778
	North: 867	
West: Pacific Ocean, 907	250/778/236/672	East: 403, 780, 587/825/368
	South: 604/778/236/672, 360/564, 509, 208/986, 406	
Yukon, Northwest Territories and Nunavut area codes: 867
Idaho area codes: 208/986
Washington area codes: 206, 253, 360, 425, 509, 564
Alaska area codes: 907
