= Area code 604 =

Telephone area code in British Columbia, Canada

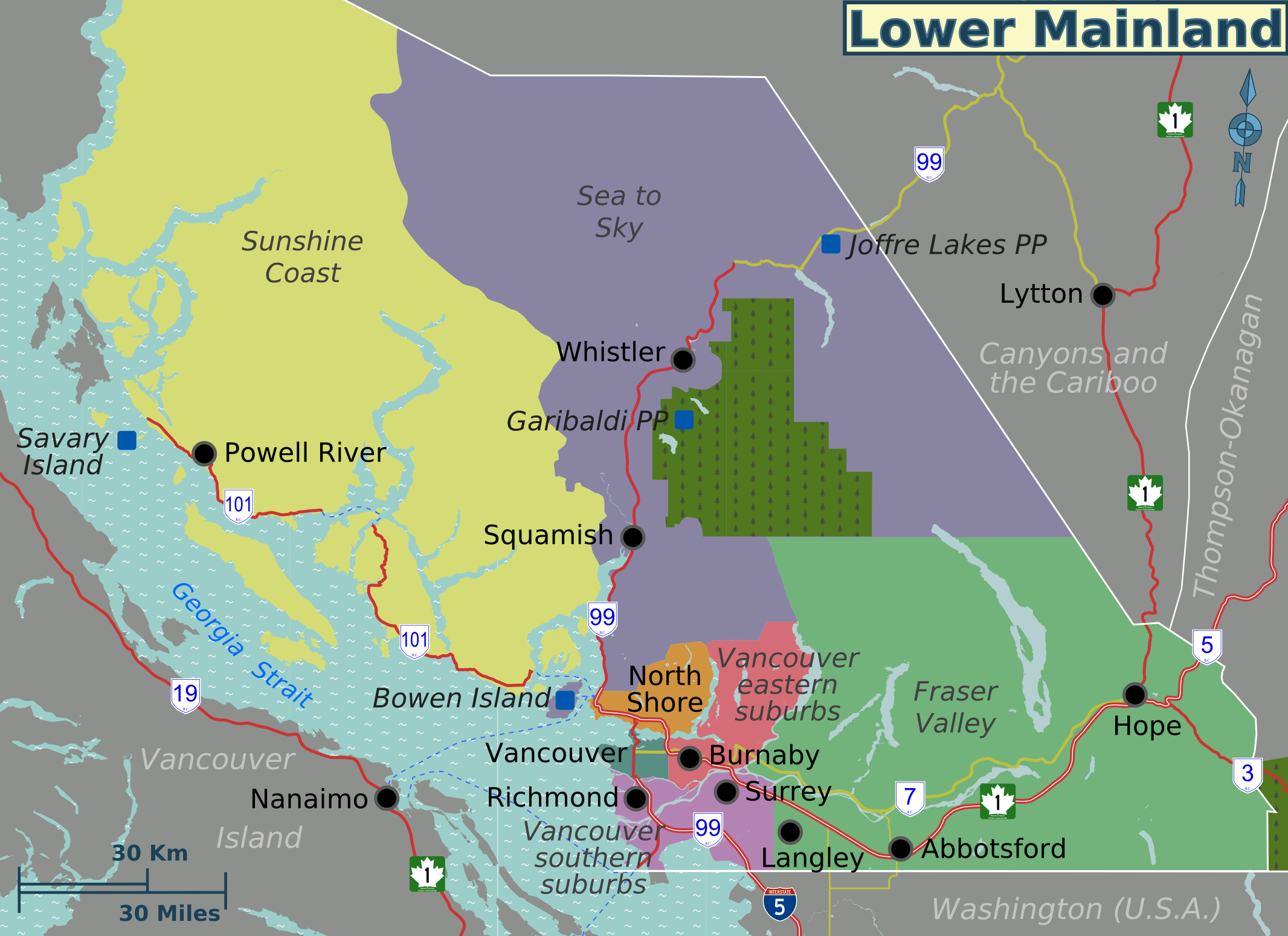
Area code 604 serves the coloured areas, as well as D'Arcy and McGillivray (slightly southwest of Seton Lake, pictured near the top right), Yale and Boston Bar (between Hope and Lytton near the Highway 1 marker), and communities along Highway 3 west of Allison Pass (not pictured). Lasqueti Island, however, is in numbering plan area 250.

Area code 604 is a telephone area code in the North American Numbering Plan for the southwestern corner of British Columbia, Canada. The numbering plan area comprises Metro Vancouver, the Sunshine Coast, Howe Sound / Sea-to-Sky Corridor, Fraser Valley, and the lower Fraser Canyon regions. The area code is one of the nine original North American area codes assigned to Canada in 1947. The numbering plan area is also served by area codes 236, 257, 672, and 778 in an overlay complex that extends to the entire province.

== History ==
Area code 604 is one of the original 86 area codes assigned in 1947 in the contiguous United States and Canada. It designated the province of British Columbia. 604 also served Point Roberts, Washington, a pene-enclave of the United States until 1968, when the area was reassigned to area code 206; since 1995, it is served by area code 360.

Despite British Columbia's growth in the second half of the 20th century, 604 remained the province's sole area code for nearly 50 years. By the mid-1990s, however, the need for a new area code in the province arose from rapid expansion of telecommunication services for cell phones and pagers. The number shortage was particularly severe in the Lower Mainland, which was home to most of the province's landlines and most of its other telecommunications devices requiring telephone numbers.

On October 19, 1996, numbering plan area 604 was reduced to span Vancouver and the Lower Mainland, including the Sunshine Coast and Whistler, with the remainder of the province served by the new area code 250.

Although the 1996 split was intended as a long-term solution, within three years, 604 was close to exhaustion once again, due to the continued proliferation of cell phones and pagers. Numbers tended to be used up fairly quickly in Vancouver and its immediate neighbours.

On November 3, 2001, area code 778 was implemented as a concentrated overlay for the two largest regional districts in the Lower Mainland, Metro Vancouver and the Fraser Valley Regional District. The experiment was announced in NANPA Planning Letter 246. The remainder of the Lower Mainland continued to use only 604, but the addition of area code 778 required the implementation of ten-digit dialling throughout the region.

The Canadian Radio-television and Telecommunications Commission (CRTC) announced on June 7, 2007, that 778 would become an overlay for the entire province on July 4, 2007. Effective June 23, 2008, ten-digit dialling became mandatory throughout the entire province of British Columbia, and attempts to make a seven-digit call triggered an intercept message with a reminder of the new rule. After September 12, 2008, seven-digit dialling was no longer functional. Overlays have become the preferred method of relief in Canada, as they offer an easy workaround for the number allocation problem.

The incumbent local exchange carrier for 604 and 778 is Telus. Through "number portability" and sub-allocation of all numbers in some exchanges to a competitor, many numbers in the 778 area code are serviced by Rogers Communications (formerly Shaw Communications).

On June 1, 2013, area code 236 was implemented as a distributed overlay of area codes 604, 250, and 778 and was expected to be exhausted in May 2020. As a result, area code 672 was implemented as an additional distributed overlay on May 4, 2019, to relieve area codes 604, 250, 778, and 236.

== Service area ==
- Abbotsford – 217 226 302 504 556 557 615 621 743 744 746 751 752 755 756 768 776 832 850 851 852 853 854 855 859 864 870
- Agassiz–Kent–Harrison Hot Springs–Chehalis – 796
- Aldergrove – 308 309 409 607 613 614 624 625 626 627 807 825 835 856 857 866 897 996
- Anmore – 461 469
- Boston Bar – 867
- Bowen Island – 947
- Burnaby – 250 290 291 292 293 294 296 297 298 299 311 312 327 328 341 412 419 420 421 422 430 431 432 433 434 435 436 437 438 439 444 450 451 453 454 456 473 570 571 610 611 612 619
- Chilliwack – 316 378 391 392 393 402 407 490 701 702 703 784 791 792 793 794 795 798 799 819 823 824 843 845 846 847 858 991 997
- Coquitlam – 931 936 939
- Delta – 940 943 946 948 952 963
- Gibsons – 840 883 885 886 887
- Hope – 201 206 712 749 750 860 869
- Langley (city) and (district municipality) – 427 455 508 509 513 514 530 532 533 534 539 546 757 881 882 888 994
- Maple Ridge – 460 462 463 465 466 467
- Mission – 286 287 289 410 814 820 826
- New Westminster – 200 202 209 237 239 245 306 351 357 374 375 376 377 395 512 515 516 517 518 519 520 521 522 523 524 525 526 527 528 529 537 540 544 545 551 553 616 617 636 759 760 761 762 763 764 765 766 777 787 788 805 808 813 818 822 828 833 838 862 868 878 889 908 920
- North Vancouver (city) and (district municipality) – 210 243 770 903 904 914 924 929 960 971 973 980 981 982 983 984 985 986 987 988 990 995 998
- Pemberton – 894
- Pender Harbour – See Gibsons
- Pitt Meadows – 458 460 465
- Port Coquitlam – 342 464 468 471 472 474 552 554 927 941 942 944 945
- Port Moody – 461 469 492 917 931 933 934 936 937 939 949
- Powell River – 208 223 344 413 414 483 485 486 487 489 578
- Richmond – 204 207 214 227 231 232 233 234 241 242 244 246 247 248 249 270 271 272 273 274 275 276 277 278 279 284 285 288 295 303 304 330 370 394 448 821
- Roberts Creek – See Gibsons
- Sechelt – 740 741 747 989
- Squamish – 213 389 390 405 567 815 848 849 890 892 898 919
- Surrey is divided into the following local rate centres:
  - Cloverdale – 574 575 576 577 579
  - Newton – 501 502 503 507 543 547 561 562 572 573 590 591 592 594 595 596 597 598 599 635
  - Whalley – 495 496 497 498 580 581 582 583 584 585 586 587 588 589 634 930 951 953 954 955 957
  - White Rock – 305 385 531 535 536 538 541 542 548
- Vancouver – 205 215 216 218 219 220 221 222 224 225 228 230 235 240 250 251 252 253 254 255 257 258 259 260 261 262 263 264 266 267 268 269 280 281 282 290 291 292 293 294 296 297 298 299 301 307 312 313 314 315 317 318 319 320 321 322 323 324 325 326 327 328 329 331 333 334 335 336 338 339 340 341 343 345 346 347 348 349 352 353 354 355 356 358 360 361 362 363 364 365 366 367 368 369 379 386 387 396 397 398 401 403 404 408 412 415 416 417 418 419 420 421 422 423 424 428 429 430 431 432 433 434 435 436 437 438 439 440 441 442 443 444 445 446 450 451 453 454 456 473 482 484 488 494 499 500 505 506 559 563 565 566 568 570 571 601 602 603 605 606 608 609 612 618 619 620 622 623 628 629 630 631 632 633 637 638 639 640 641 642 643 644 645 646 647 648 649 650 651 652 653 654 655 656 657 658 659 660 661 662 663 664 665 666 667 668 669 671 674 675 676 677 678 679 680 681 682 683 684 685 686 687 688 689 690 691 692 693 694 695 696 697 699 704 707 708 709 710 713 714 715 716 717 718 719 720 721 722 723 724 725 726 727 728 729 730 731 732 733 734 735 736 737 738 739 742 753 754 757 767 771 773 775 779 780 781 782 783 785 786 789 790 800 801 802 803 806 809 812 816 817 822 827 829 830 831 834 836 837 839 841 842 844 861 871 872 873 874 875 876 877 879 880 891 893 895 899 909 910 915 916 918 928 961 968 970 974 975 976 977 978 979 992 999
- West Vancouver – 229 281 670 758 912 913 920 921 922 923 925 926
- Whistler – 203 388 400 402 493 698 902 905 906 907 932 935 938 962 964 965 966 967 972
- Yale – 863

== See also ==
- List of North American Numbering Plan area codes

British Columbia area codes: 250, 604, 236/257/672/778
	North: 250, 236/257/672/778	
West: 250, 236/257/672/778	604, 236/257/672/778	East: 250, 236/257/672/778
	South: 360/564	
Washington area codes: 206, 253, 360, 425, 509, 564
