= Area code 360 =

Telephone area code for western Washington, United States

Numbering plan areas of Washington, with 360 highlighted in red.

Area code 360 is a telephone area code in the North American Numbering Plan (NANP) for the part of Washington state outside metropolitan Seattle and west of the Cascade Mountains. The numbering plan area (NPA) serves all of western Washington outside urban King, Pierce, and Snohomish counties and Bainbridge Island, The area code was newly assigned in 1995 in an area code split of 206, Washington's original area code since 1947.

Since 2017, the numbering plan area has been part of an overlay complex with area code 564, which also overlays 206.

== History ==
From 1947 to 1957, all of Washington state was assigned area code 206 for routing long-distance telephone calls in Operator Toll Dialing. In 1957, the numbering plan area (NPA) was reduced to just Western Washington, with most of Eastern Washington (east of the Cascade Mountains) receiving area code 509.

Washington remained with two NPAs for 38 years. This configuration was unchanged even with western Washington's explosive growth in the second half of the 20th century and the proliferation of cell phones, fax machines, and pagers. By the early 1990s, the ensuing resource pressure meant that the need for additional central office prefixes and telephone numbers could no longer be staved off. Accordingly, of the region outside the Seattle and Tacoma areas was split from 206 to form a new numbering plan area with area code 360.

Numbering plan area 360 comprises two sections that resulted from numbering disputes in the community. The configuration arose when residents of several Seattle exurbs protested their move from the more-established 206 to the new area code. In response, US West returned some central offices in these exurbs to 206. However, 206 was on the brink of exhaustion even after the creation of 360. The restoration of these exurbs forced the Washington Public Utilities Commission to switch most of Seattle's suburban ring into areas 253 and 425 in 1998, sooner than originally planned.

This made 360 one of the few NPAs in the North American Numbering Plan without a continuous land border; (Note: The eastern and western portions of 360 border legally because Snohomish, Island, Kitsap and Jefferson counties join in mid-sound.) others include 706 in Georgia, 423 in Tennessee and 386 in Florida.

In 1999, the Washington Utilities and Transportation Commission intended to overlay 360 with an additional area code, but the implementation was delayed indefinitely. A 2016 report forecasted exhaustion in 2018. The change was finally approved in May 2016. On August 28, 2017 numbering plan area 360 was assigned the second area code, 564, to form an overlay numbering plan. Area code 564 is intended to eventually overlay other western Washington NPAs (206, 253, and 425) when demand requires numbering relief action. Beginning July 29, 2017 all calls in western Washington required ten-digit dialing. the first 564 prefix was assigned in 2021 and the final 360 prefix was assigned on October 22, 2021.

Area codes 360 and 334 (Alabama), which began service on the same day, were the first two interchangeable NPA codes in the North American Numbering Plan, having a middle digit other than 0 or 1.

== Service area ==
The larger, western portion stretches from the Strait of Juan de Fuca through the Olympic Peninsula and Southwest Washington to the Oregon border, while the portion on the east shore of Puget Sound stretches from the border with British Columbia, Canada, almost to Everett. Whidbey Island in Puget Sound is also included.

Cities and towns in the numbering plan area include:

- Aberdeen
- Anacortes
- Arlington
- Battle Ground
- Bellingham
- Bremerton
- Burlington
- Camas
- Centralia
- Chehalis
- Enumclaw
- Ferndale
- Forks
- Kelso
- Longview
- Marysville
- Mount Vernon
- Oak Harbor
- Olympia
- Orting
- Point Roberts (Note: Until 1988, Point Roberts was served by BC Tel, with Canadian area code 604; calls from elsewhere in the United States were billed as calls to a suburb of Vancouver, British Columbia, even though the city is within the State of Washington, and its territory in the United States since the settlement of the 19th-century Oregon boundary dispute. On January 1, 1988, Point Roberts telephone service was sold to Whidbey Telephone Company and was moved to area code 206 (subsequently split to 360) and such calls became domestic, at the expense of Point Roberts subscribers losing the ability to make local calls to the surrounding Lower Mainland area.)
- Port Angeles
- Port Orchard
- Port Townsend
- Poulsbo
- Raymond
- Ridgefield
- Sequim
- Shelton
- Silverdale
- Snohomish
- South Bend
- Stanwood
- Vancouver
- Washougal
- Woodland
- Yelm

== See also ==
- List of Washington (state) area codes
- List of North American Numbering Plan area codes

== Notes ==
Washington area codes: 206, 253, 360, 425, 509, 564
	North: 236/672/778, 250, 604	
West: Pacific Ocean, 236/672/778, 250	360 / 564 (206, 253, 425)	East: 509
	South: 503/971	
British Columbia area codes: 250, 604, 236/257/672/778
Oregon area codes: 503/971, 541/458
