= Lawn Point Provincial Park =

Provincial park in British Columbia, Canada

- IUCN category II (national park)
- Location within Vancouver Island Location within British Columbia
- Interactive map of Lawn Point Provincial Park
- Location: British Columbia, Canada
- Nearest city: Port Alice
- Coordinates: 50°20′14″N 127°58′25″W
- Area: 5.84 km^{2} (2.25 sq mi)
- Established: April 30, 1996
- Governing body: BC Parks

Lawn Point Provincial Park is a provincial park in British Columbia, Canada.

The 584 ha (1,440 acres) park is located south of Quatsino Sound on the west coast of northern Vancouver Island. It can be accessed by land via the town of Port Alice on a series of logging roads.
