= Holberg, British Columbia =

Holberg
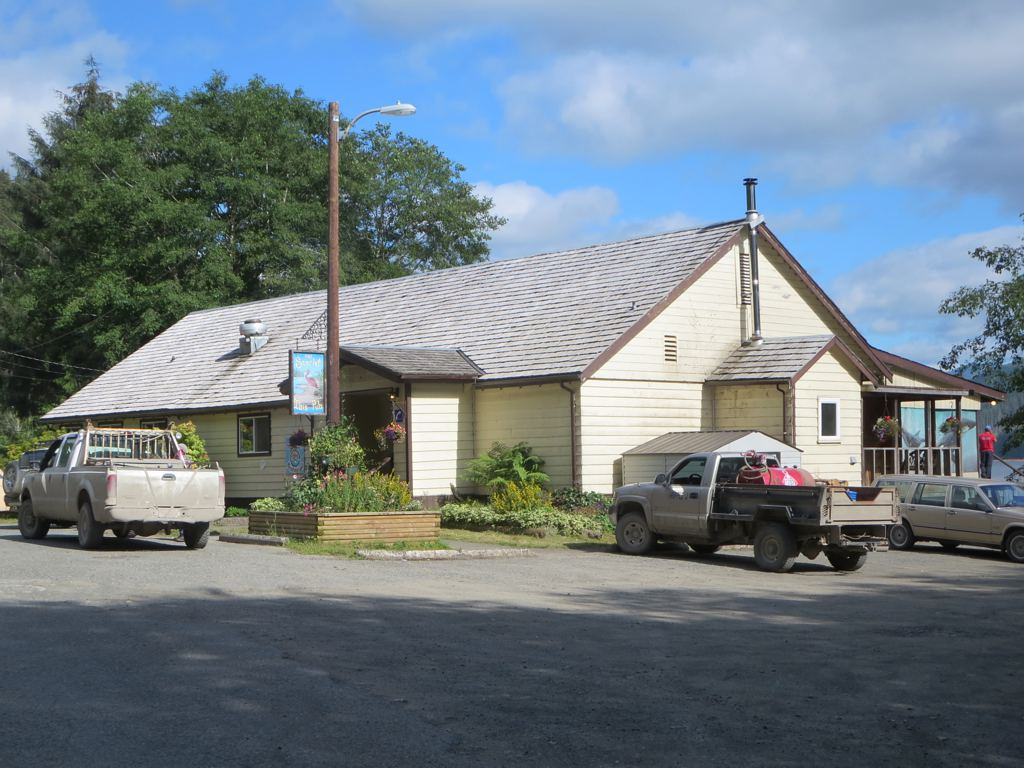

- Location of Holberg in British Columbia Holberg (British Columbia)
- Coordinates: 50°39′21″N 128°00′41″W
- Country: Canada
- Province: British Columbia
- Region: Vancouver Island
- Regional District: Mount Waddington

Population (2021)
  - Total: 15
- Time zone: UTC−07:00 (PT)
- Area codes: 250, 778, 236, & 672

Holberg is a former ferry terminal about 35 kilometres (22 mi) from the northwest tip of Vancouver Island, British Columbia. This unincorporated community is at the head of Holberg Inlet, which forms the western arm of Quatsino Sound.

== Prelude ==
A Danish community existed at Cape Scott, British Columbia from 1897. To encourage settlers to relocate south to the San Josef Valley, between San Josef Bay and the future Holberg, the government promised to build a wagon road along that route. By 1909, the harsh conditions had dwindled the population, leaving only two residents at the cape. New waves of Danish immigrants mainly settled along the valley.

== Early community ==
In 1909, a new Danish settlement was named Holberg, after Baron Ludvig Holberg, a distinguished Danish-Norwegian historian, dramatist and utopian novelist. An alternative claim suggests this settlement was established in 1907, and was formerly called West Arm. However, a recollection from the summer of 1908 implies no settlement being at Holberg. Nels C. Nelson, who had run the general store at the cape, became the inaugural postmaster in 1909.

Work began on the promised wagon road and installing telegraph lines along the trails connecting Holberg to Cape Scott, San Josef Bay, Sea Otter Cove and Shushartie. Enlistments for World War I in 1914 ended progress on the road, and the area population plummeted from an approximate 1,000 peak. After the war, work resumed on the road, but the mountainous section between the valleys remained uncompleted until the late 1930s. A store opened in the mid-1920s. The community population was 27 in 1939, 24 in 1940, and 53 in 1943. The latter likely included loggers in the vicinity.

== Logging ==
In the late 1920s, commercial logging commenced, but collapsed during the Great Depression. By the late 1930s, large scale operations were underway along Holberg Inlet. Logs were assembled into log rafts, and towed by tug to the Port Alice pulp mill. A decade later, the Holberg floating logging camp, which housed 250 people, was the largest in the area, dwarfing Holberg itself. Floating camps could be towed to logging sites along the shoreline, but were phased out in the 1950s for land-based camps, because the remaining stands were much farther inland from the shores.

== CFS base ==
During World War II, the Cape Scott radar to the northwest operated to detect enemy aircraft. In dealing with the subsequent Cold War threat from the USSR, the Pinetree Line of 44 radar stations across Canada was established, Holberg being at the western end. The tracking site was on the Mt. Brandes peak, and the base station was at the foot of Mt. Hansen, about 6 kilometres (4 mi) north of Holberg. Construction began in 1950, and the facility became operational as RCAF Station Holberg in 1954.

The base supported a population of 850 at its peak. Renamings were 53 Aircraft Control & Warning Squadron in 1956, 53 Radar Squadron in 1958, and Canadian Forces Station Holberg in 1967. From 1958, reporting was to the Seattle NORAD Sector. Redundant by 1973, Holberg remained as a back-up facility.

Supporting infrastructure introduced was a Hudson's Bay store in 1962, radio station CFHG in 1963, a new CANEX Store in 1972, and cable TV in 1981, replacing the fuzzy CBC and CTV signals.

CFHG primarily broadcast the programs of Vancouver CBC Radio station CBU, but also included local programs produced by volunteers at the station. Initially airing up to 28 hours of local content per week, production gradually increased to as much as 68 hours by 1984. Sold to Western Forest Products when the base closed, the station became a community-owned full rebroadcaster of CBU. Like other CBC Radio One repeaters on Vancouver Island, CFHG now rebroadcasts CBCV-FM Victoria.

The base closed in August 1990. The tracking site at the peak was converted to a Minimally-attended NWS Long Range Radar station. The buildings and equipment were removed from the base site within months, where overgrown roads remain the only reminder.

== Highways & ferries ==
In 1910, a monthly Canadian Pacific Railway Coast Service (CP) ferry service to the Holberg terminal began, which became twice monthly the next year. An alternative route was the CP ferry north to Port Hardy, the trail to Coal Harbour, and a launch to Holberg. In 1918, this trail became a wagon road. In 1917, the regular ferry terminal switched to Port Alice, with a monthly extension to Holberg for a decade, before becoming a stop by prior arrangement. By the mid-1930s, most arrivals disembarked at Quatsino and travelled up the inlet by launch. The other option was via Port Hardy, stage to Coal Harbour, and launch to Holberg.

Around 1950, the CP ferry ceased serving the Quatsino Sound, leaving only the Port Hardy access. In 1965, the Holberg–Port Hardy forestry service road opened, which remains a long, winding, gravel route.

== Present community ==
In the early 1970s, Art and Judy Jones opened the Scarlet Ibis Pub & Restaurant, as a traditional English pub. About 1980, Pat Gwynne joined the staff. When the owners wanted to sell in 1983, Pat bought the business. Probably Vancouver Island's most remote restaurant pub, the establishment remained popular with both locals and visitors. After selling the venture in 2019, Pat left the area. However, when the buyer failed to meet legal obligations, Pat returned to run the pub. The pub was again sold in 2020 to 12 friends from across Vancouver Island and Canada.

In 2011, the census recorded 51 permanent residents in Holberg, dropping to 35 by 2016 and further to 15 by 2021.

Other infrastructure comprises a general store/gas bar, post office, medical clinic and motel.

== Climate ==
Holberg is noted for its high level of precipitation.

Climate data for Holberg
Month	Jan	Feb	Mar	Apr	May	Jun	Jul	Aug	Sep	Oct	Nov	Dec	Year
Record high °C (°F)	15.5 (59.9)	15.6 (60.1)	20.6 (69.1)	27.0 (80.6)	32.5 (90.5)	30.6 (87.1)	31.1 (88.0)	32.5 (90.5)	31.1 (88.0)	22.8 (73.0)	16.1 (61.0)	15.5 (59.9)	32.5 (90.5)
Mean daily maximum °C (°F)	6.1 (43.0)	7.3 (45.1)	9.2 (48.6)	11.7 (53.1)	14.1 (57.4)	16.0 (60.8)	18.9 (66.0)	19.6 (67.3)	18.1 (64.6)	13.3 (55.9)	7.9 (46.2)	6.1 (43.0)	12.4 (54.3)
Daily mean °C (°F)	3.5 (38.3)	4.3 (39.7)	5.4 (41.7)	7.3 (45.1)	9.8 (49.6)	12.0 (53.6)	14.5 (58.1)	15.1 (59.2)	13.4 (56.1)	9.7 (49.5)	5.4 (41.7)	3.6 (38.5)	8.7 (47.6)
Mean daily minimum °C (°F)	0.8 (33.4)	1.3 (34.3)	1.7 (35.1)	2.9 (37.2)	5.5 (41.9)	8.0 (46.4)	10.1 (50.2)	10.6 (51.1)	8.6 (47.5)	6.2 (43.2)	2.8 (37.0)	1.1 (34.0)	5.0 (40.9)
Record low °C (°F)	−17.2 (1.0)	−11.5 (11.3)	−6.5 (20.3)	−6.0 (21.2)	−1.1 (30.0)	1.5 (34.7)	3.0 (37.4)	4.0 (39.2)	0.0 (32.0)	−2.8 (27.0)	−15.0 (5.0)	−14.4 (6.1)	−17.2 (1.0)
Average precipitation mm (inches)	504.1 (19.85)	399.0 (15.71)	371.2 (14.61)	285.3 (11.23)	197.2 (7.76)	173.8 (6.84)	104.2 (4.10)	114.1 (4.49)	253.0 (9.96)	448.0 (17.64)	552.7 (21.76)	509.0 (20.04)	3,911.4 (153.99)
Source: Environment Canada

== See also ==
- Cape Scott Provincial Park
- Raft Cove Provincial Park
- Ronning Gardens
- Winter Harbour
