= Seahurst, Washington =

Unincorporated community in Washington, United States

- Unincorporated community
- Location within Washington (state)
- Coordinates: 47°28′09″N 122°21′43″W
- Country: United States
- State: Washington
- County: King
- Elevation: 331 ft (101 m)
- Time zone: UTC-8 (Pacific (PST))
  - Summer (DST): UTC-7 (PDT)
- ZIP Code: 98062
- Area code(s): 206, 564
- GNIS feature ID: 1512649

Seahurst is a neighbourhood in Burien, Washington, United States. Seahurst is located on Puget Sound west of Downtown Burien and Ambaum Blvd SW. Seahurst has a post office with ZIP Code 98062.

== Climate ==
This region experiences warm (but not hot) and dry summers, with no average monthly temperatures above 71.6 °F. According to the Köppen Climate Classification system, Seahurst has a warm-summer Mediterranean climate, abbreviated "Csb" on climate maps.
