= Area code 564 =

Telephone area code for western Washington, United States

Coordinates: 47°36′35″N 122°19′59″W

Numbering plan areas of Washington and overlay complex 564 (red)

Area code 564 is a telephone overlay area code in the North American Numbering Plan (NANP) for Western Washington state, including metropolitan Seattle. It overlays the combined numbering plan areas of area codes 206 and 360.

The area code was first proposed in 1999 to relieve telephone number shortages of area code 360, but implementation was delayed until 2017, when it was installed as an overlay to numbering plan area (NPA) 360. Neighboring NPAs 206, 253, and 425 were slated for expansion of the overlay complex upon exhaustion of central office codes in each NPA. In 2023, area code 206 was approved for expansion with a guide line for preparation of inclusion of at least nine months. Ten-digit dialing has been mandatory in all of western Washington since July 29, 2017.

== History ==
From 1947 to 1957, all of Washington state was assigned area code 206 for routing long-distance telephone calls in Operator Toll Dialing. In 1957, the numbering plan area was split, with area code 509 implemented for the state east of the Cascade Range. This configuration remained in place until 1995, when resource pressure from the proliferation of cell phones, fax machines, and pagers required additional central office prefixes and telephone numbers. Most of the region outside the Seattle and Tacoma areas was split from 206 to form a new numbering plan area with area code 360.

By the late 1990s, projections indicated possible exhaustion once again, so that in 1999, area code 564 was assigned for installation as an overlay of NPA 360, with an in-service date of August 1, 2000.

In May 2000, the Washington Utilities and Transportation Commission (WUTC) projected that the metropolitan Seattle area codes (206, 253, and 425) would also soon exhaust their number pools, and it expanded the 564 plan to include those areas in the overlay. By the summer, however, the relief action was determined not to be immediately necessary. On August 22, 2001, the WUTC announced that increased efficiency in the reuse of the existing number pool meant that the immediate need for the new area code had subsided. Part of that was also attributed to a downturn in the telecommunications sector. The overlay implementation was suspended until at least October 1, 2002.

Since the development of the initial plan for the area code, the WUTC and the NANPA have rejected the telephone companies' request for a new area code and instead directed them to actively share and efficiently use the number blocks that had already been assigned. That refers mainly to the practice of number pooling, which allocates a single telephone exchange prefix in ten blocks of one thousand telephone numbers for more efficient allocation, rather than assigning a prefix's whole numbering space (10,000 numbers) to one carrier in a single rate center.

The WUTC took further steps to decrease the need for new number blocks in 360 and 509 and head off the need for new area codes, including aggressive reclamation of unused and underused number blocks and exchanges. The introduction of mandatory local and wireless number portability (a prerequisite for number pooling) has also served to stem the demand for new numbers and thus new area codes.

According to the WUTC's estimate as of March 2014, the earliest projection for any Western Washington area code to be exhausted was 2018 for area code 360. The other codes were not expected to exhaust before 2025.

Area code 564 was finally implemented on August 28, 2017. Ten-digit dialing had been mandatory since July 29, 2017, for all local calls in Western Washington.

Since September 30, 2017, telephone numbers with the area code 564 have been issued in the existing number plan area 360.

On June 15, 2023, the WUTC approved expanding the coverage of area code 564 to include numbering plan area 206.

Per NANPA analysis and determination, the overlay complex may be extended only as needed when NPAs 206 (which occurred in 2025), 253, or 425 are nearing exhaustion. NPAs 253 and 425 are nowhere near exhaustion.

== See also ==
- List of North American Numbering Plan area codes
- List of Washington (state) area codes

Washington area codes: 206, 253, 360, 425, 509, 564
	North: 236/672/778, 250, 604	
West: Pacific Ocean, 236/250/672/778	564/360/206	East: 509
	South: 503/971	
British Columbia area codes: 250, 604, 236/257/672/778
Oregon area codes: 503/971, 541/458
