= Westwold =

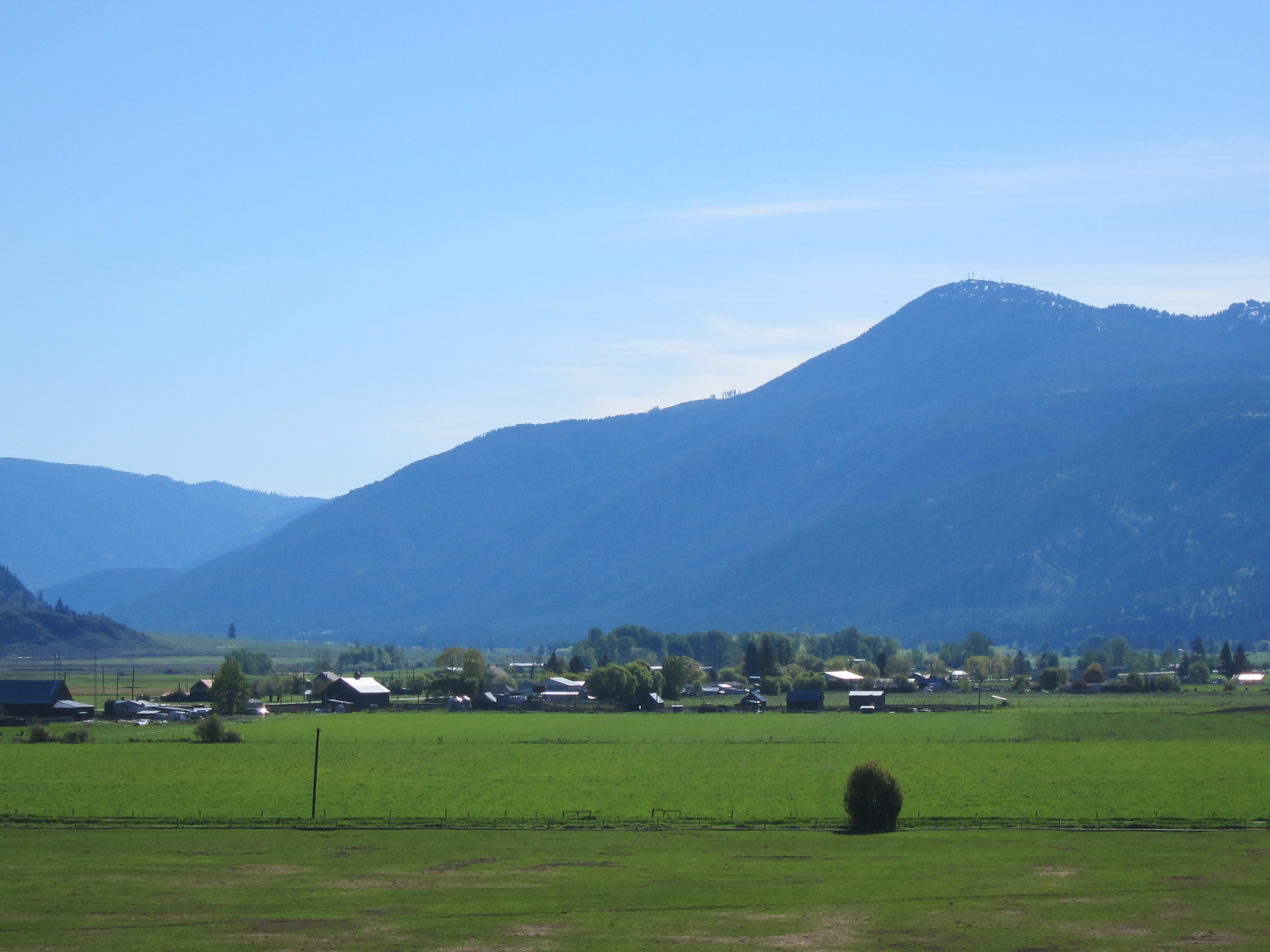

- Location of Westwold in British Columbia
- Coordinates: 50°28′0″N 119°45′0″W
- Country: Canada
- Province: British Columbia
- Postal code: V0E 3B0
- Area codes: 250, 778

Westwold is an unincorporated settlement (established in 1864), in the Interior of British Columbia. A small farming and logging community, it is located between Kamloops and Vernon on Highway 97. The original name for the settlement was "Grand Prairie", but this was changed in 1925 with the construction of a CNR spur line to Kelowna, to avoid a station name conflict. Glacial tills near the townsite of Westwold have provided fossils from the Sangamonian Stage 130,000 years ago.
