= List of Washington area codes =

List of Washington area codes may refer to:

- List of Washington (state) area codes
- List of Washington, D.C., area codes
