= Ronning =

Ronning, Rønning, or Rönning can mean:

People

- Carol Ronning Kapsner, justice of North Dakota Supreme Court
- Chester Ronning, Canadian politician
- Cliff Ronning, ice hockey player
- Eldar Rønning, Norwegian skier
- Frode Rønning, Norwegian sprinter
- Geir Rönning, Norwegian musician in Sweden and Finland
- Nils Nilsen Ronning, journalist and author from Bø Municipality (Telemark)
- Thomas Ronning, American chef/pastry chef
- Ron Ng, Hong Kong TVB actor and singer

Place

- Ronning Gardens, British Columbia
