= List of Washington (state) area codes =

Area codes in Washington state

The U.S. state of Washington has six telephone area codes serving five geographically distinct numbering plan areas (NPAs). In 1947, the state was assigned a single area code (206) until it was divided in 1957 with the creation of area code 509 to serve Eastern Washington.

In 1995, 206 was split again to serve just the Puget Sound region after area code 360 was created for the remainder of Western Washington. In 1997, area code 425 was assigned to Seattle's Eastside and South Snohomish County suburbs and area code 253 for the Tacoma area, leaving 206 for just the city of Seattle, closely neighboring cities in King and Snohomish counties, and Bainbridge Island in Kitsap County.

Area code	Year created	Parent NPA	Overlay	Numbering plan area
206	1947	–	206/564	Seattle, Shoreline, Lake Forest Park, Mercer Island, Bainbridge Island, Vashon Island
360	1995	206	360/564	Western Washington excluding most of the Seattle metropolitan area; includes Olympia, Kitsap County, Bellingham, and Vancouver
564	2017	206	206/564	NPA 206
564	2023	360	360/564	NPA 360
253	1997	206	–	Southern Puget Sound region, including Tacoma, most of Pierce County, Auburn, and Federal Way
425	1997	206	–	Suburbs north and east of Seattle; Eastside and southern Snohomish County, including Everett, Snoqualmie Pass, and Renton
509	1957	206	–	Eastern Washington, including Spokane, the Tri-Cities, Yakima, Walla Walla, and Wenatchee

== See also ==
- List of North American Numbering Plan area codes
