= Swanson Bay =

- Location of Swanson Bay in British Columbia
- Coordinates: 53°01′00″N 128°31′00″W
- Country: Canada
- Province: British Columbia

Swanson Bay is a ghost town in British Columbia, Canada located in Graham Reach on the Inside Passage, between Princess Royal Island and the northern mainland. It was named after Captain John Swanson of the Hudson's Bay Company's steamship, the SS Beaver.

In 1909, one of the first sulfite pulp mills on the B.C. coast was established here, with a planing and shingle mill added later. Whalen Pulp and Paper Mills of Vancouver, also the proprietor of the pulp mill at Port Alice, operated it until 1918, when they abandoned it as unprofitable. The post office remained until 1943. Today all that can be seen is a ruined chimney and some rotten pilings.

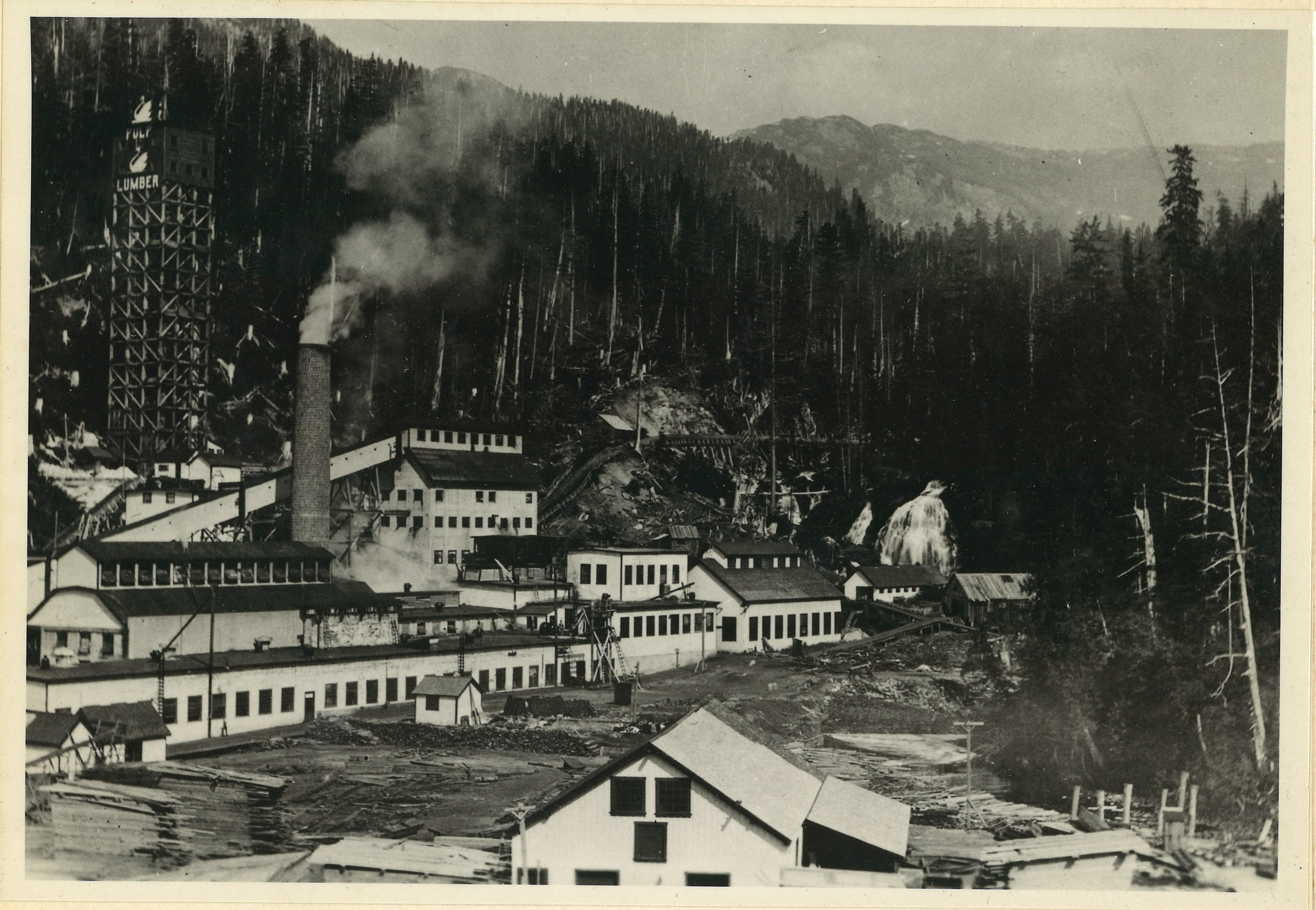
The Whalen Brothers mill at Swansons Bay, 1918
