= Neroutsos Inlet =

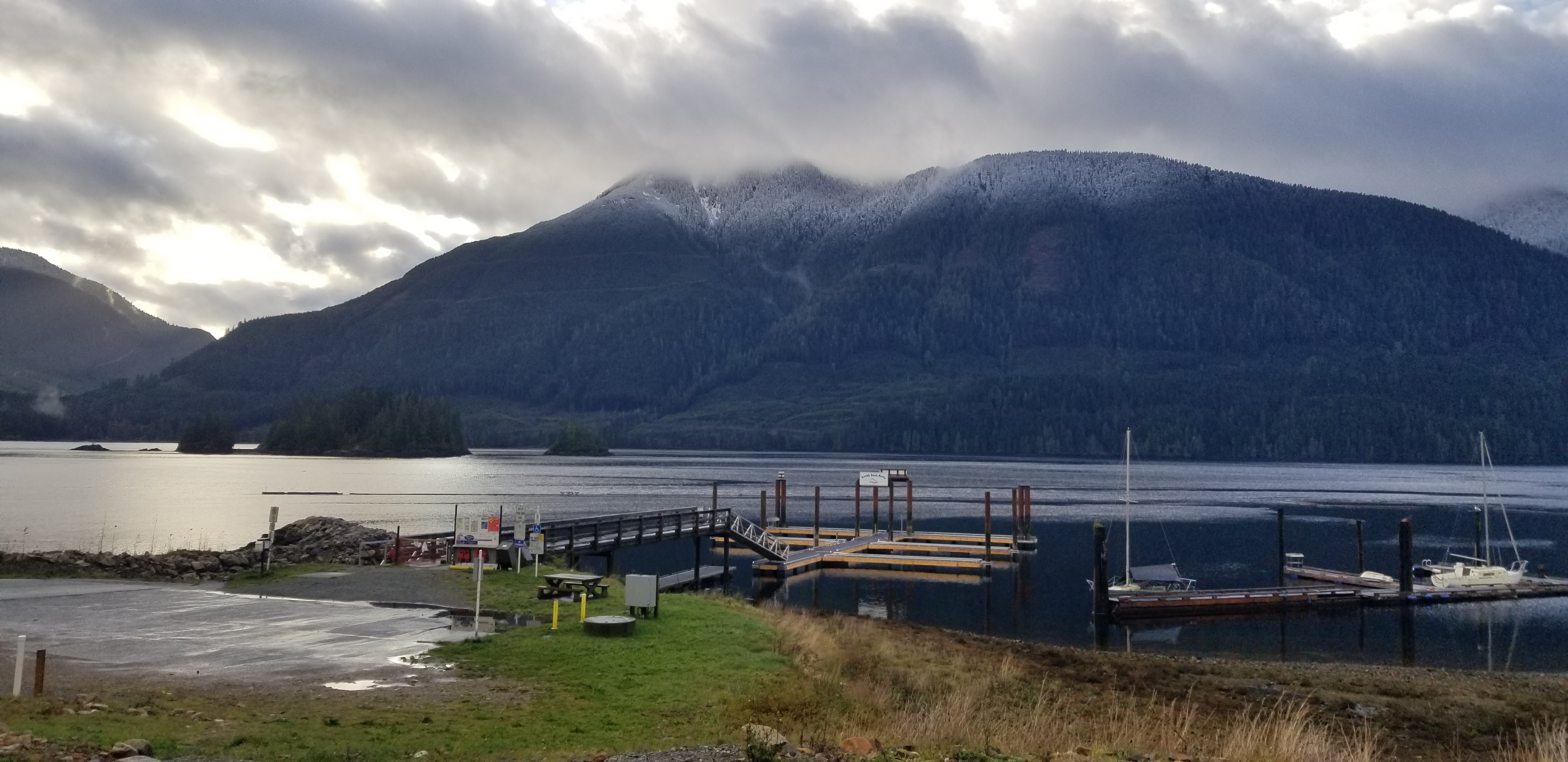

- Location within British Columbia
- Location: British Columbia, Canada
- Coordinates: 50°26′00″N 127°31′00″W
- Type: inlet
- Part of: Quatsino Sound
- Max. length: 21 km (13 mi)
- Max. width: 1.6 km (1 mi)
- Max. depth: 182.9 m (600 ft)
- Settlements: Port Alice

Neroutsos Inlet is an inlet on the north end of Vancouver Island in British Columbia, Canada. It is the south-east arm of Quatsino Sound.

Its entrance is northeast of Drake Island, about 29 kilometres (18 mi) from the entrance to Quatsino Sound. The inlet is 21 kilometres (13 mi) long in a southeasterly direction and varies in width from 550 metres (600 yd) to 1.6 kilometres (1 mi). Its shore are generally rugged and high, being backed by mountains from 610 to 910 metres (2,000 to 3,000 ft) high and terminating in low land at its head. Islands in the inlet are Lyons Islet, Frigon Islets, and Ketchen Island.

On the eastern shore of the inlet is Port Alice in an area with steep slopes, which experiences heavy rainfall and periodic mud and rock slides.

It experienced one of the severest marine pollution due to untreated waste from a sulfite pulp mill at Port Alice, which operated there since 1917.

== Etymology ==
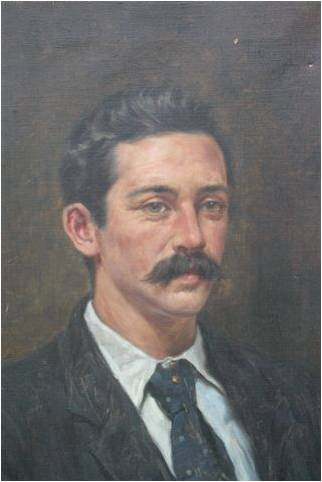
A Portrait of Capt. C.D. Neroutsos

The inlet was named on 3 May 1927 after Captain Cyril Demetrius Neroutsos (1868–1954), known as "The Skipper", who was manager of Canadian Pacific Railway Coastal Service at the time the feature was named.

Neroutsos participated in the famed New Zealand to London clipper ship races around The Cape, and, with the Australian, South American and East Indies trade, sailed around the world four times before the age of 18. Was signed on with the British India Steam Navigation Company, and was working out of Seattle as the marine superintendent for the Frank Waterhouse Company during the Gold Rush. Joined the Canadian Pacific Navigation Company in 1901, as marine superintendent. Serving aboard S.S. Islander in Alaska waters when she struck an iceberg and sunk in 20 minutes, with great loss of life; Neroutsos was the only executive officer to survive.
