= Ronning Gardens =

Botanical garden in Canada

Ronning Gardens, located in a remote location near the northwest tip of Vancouver Island, British Columbia, Canada, were established by Norwegian settler Bernt Ronning around 1910. Over the years, Ronning planted nearly 5 acres (20,000 m^{2}) with many species of trees, shrubs and flowers collected from all over the world.

After he died in 1963, Ronning's garden was reclaimed by the temperate rainforest of northern Vancouver Island. However, some years later the property was purchased and the new owners began restoring the gardens.

== Nearby communities ==
- Holberg
- Winter Harbour

== See also ==
- Cape Scott Provincial Park
