= Quatsino Provincial Park =

Provincial park in British Columbia, Canada

- IUCN category II (national park)
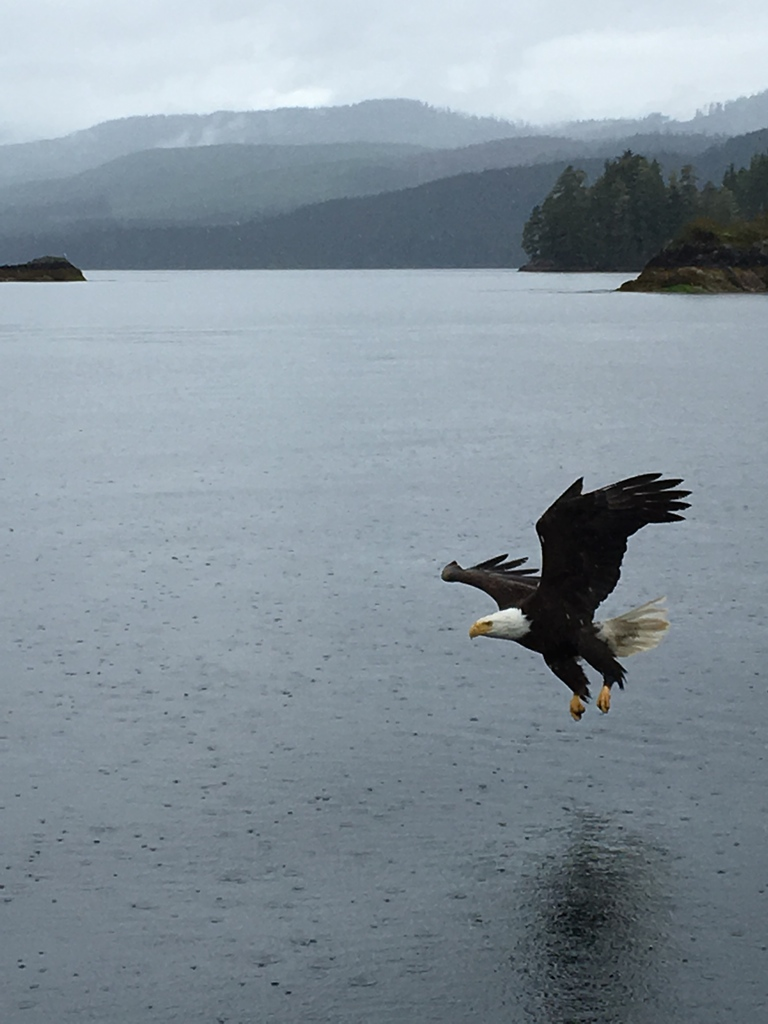
- A bald eagle just above a lake in the park

- Location within Vancouver Island Location within British Columbia
- Interactive map of Quatsino Provincial Park
- Location: British Columbia, Canada
- Nearest city: Port Alice
- Coordinates: 50°29′38″N 127°49′03″W
- Area: 654 ha (1,620 acres)
- Established: July 13, 1995
- Governing body: BC Parks

Quatsino Provincial Park is a provincial park in British Columbia, Canada, located on Quatsino Sound on northern Vancouver Island. The park was established July 12, 1995 and is 654 hectares (1,620 acres) in size. The park is 50 kilometres (31 mi) west of Port Hardy, British Columbia and is accessible by rough logging roads or by boat. Quatsino is on a popular kayaking route.

== Conservation ==
This undeveloped park protects some of the largest old-growth trees, some small lakes, Koprino Harbour, which is a sheltered inlet, and the Koprino River estuary, which is noted for its critical fish-rearing and waterfowl habitat. The park also protects nesting and feeding habitat that is used by a high concentration of bald eagles. Black bears are very common in Quatsino Provincial Park, as are coastal black-tailed deer and cougars.

== Recreation ==
The following recreational activities are available: backcountry camping and hiking, kayaking and canoeing, fishing and hunting. Quatsino Provincial Park is primarily a marine-access recreational park.

== See also ==
- List of British Columbia Provincial Parks
- List of Canadian provincial parks
