= Area code 509 =

Telephone area code for eastern Washington state

Coordinates: 47°N 118°W

Numbering plan areas of Washington, with 509 highlighted in red.

Area code 509 is the telephone area code in the North American Numbering Plan (NANP) for the eastern part of the U.S. state of Washington. The numbering plan area (NPA) roughly comprises the state east of the Cascade Mountains, and includes Spokane, the Tri-Cities (Richland, Pasco, and Kennewick), Ellensburg, Yakima, Walla Walla, Wenatchee, and Stevenson at the south west. The area code was assigned in a split of area code 206 in 1956.

== History ==
When the American Telephone and Telegraph Company (AT&T) devised the first nationwide telephone numbering plan for Operator Toll Dialing in 1947, the state of Washington was designated as a single numbering plan area and area code 206 as assigned as one of the 86 original North American area codes.

With the build-out of the toll dialing system, and the beginnings of conversion for direct distance dialing by subscribers, AT&T divided the numbering plan area and designated the eastern part with area code 509 in 1956.

The eastern part of Washington is not as densely populated as the west side of the Cascades. As a result, 509 remained unchanged while the west side of the Cascades went from one area code to four from 1995 to 1997.

However, the NANP Administrator has projected that 509's central office codes will be exhausted by 2028. This is primarily due to the proliferation of cell phones, particularly in Spokane, Yakima, and the Tri-Cities.

Prior to October 2021, area code 509 had telephone numbers assigned for the central office code 988. In 2020, 988 was designated nationwide as a dialing code for the National Suicide Prevention Lifeline, which created a conflict for exchanges that permit seven-digit dialing. This area code was therefore scheduled to transition to ten-digit dialing by October 24, 2021.

== See also ==
- List of Washington (state) area codes
- List of North American Numbering Plan area codes

Washington area codes: 206, 253, 360, 425, 509, 564
	North: 250/778/236/672	
West: 360, 425	509	East: 208/986
	South: 541/458	
British Columbia area codes: 250, 604, 236/257/672/778
Idaho area codes: 208/986
Oregon area codes: 503/971, 541/458
