= Quatsino Sound =

Body of water on the coast of Vancouver Island in British Columbia, Canada

- French: Baie Quatsino
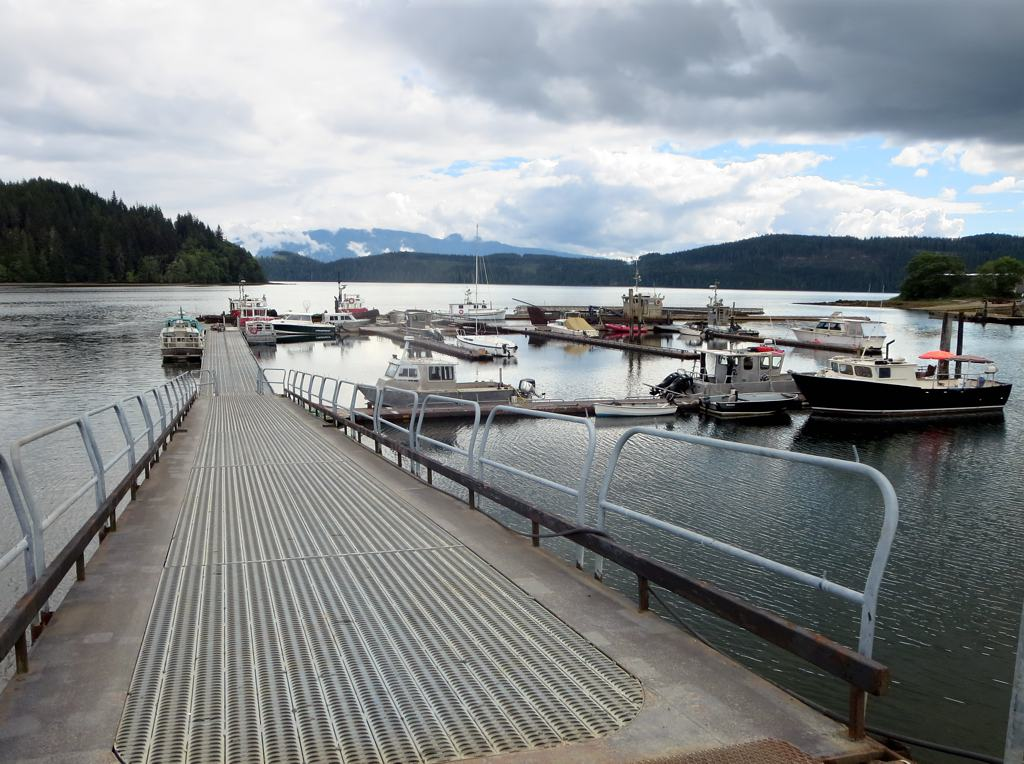
- Coal Harbour, a village located in Holberg Inlet

- Location in British Columbia
- Location: Vancouver Island, British Columbia
- Coordinates: 50°30′30″N 127°42′00″W
- Ocean/sea sources: Pacific Ocean
- Islands: Drake Island
- Sections/sub-basins: Forward Inlet, Holberg Inlet, Koskimo Bay, Koprino Harbour, Neroutsos Inlet, Rupert Inlet
- Settlements: Coal Harbour, Holberg, Port Alice, Quatsino, Winter Harbour

Quatsino Sound is a complex of coastal inlets, bays and islands on northwestern Vancouver Island in the Canadian province of British Columbia. It is the northernmost of the five sounds that pierce the west coast of Vancouver Island, the others being Kyuquot Sound, Nootka Sound, Clayoquot Sound, and Barkley Sound.

== Geography ==
Quatsino Sound extends east from the Pacific Ocean. Near its entrance, on the north side, is Forward Inlet, that branches into several smaller inlets, including the Winter Harbour and village of Winter Harbour. Koskimo Bay and Koprino Harbour are located further east into Quatsino Sound. Drake Island, which is named after Justice Montague Tyrwhitt-Drake, (Mayor of Victoria 1876-1877) lies near the eastern end of Quatsino Sound, and the long Neroutsos Inlet extends southeast from Drake Island. The town of Port Alice lies near the end of Neroutsos Inlet. East of Drake Island, Quatsino Narrows connects the eastern end of Quatsino Sound to Holberg Inlet and the smaller Rupert Inlet. Quatsino Narrows is a tidal rapids (which are also known in British Columbia as skookumchucks), with currents reaching 9 knots (17 km/h; 10 mph) during flood tide. The sound is located in the Regional District of Mount Waddington.

== See also ==
- List of fjords in Canada
- Quatsino First Nation
- Quatsino Provincial Park
- British Columbia Coast
