= Winter Harbour =

Harbour near British Columbia

Coordinates: 50°31′N 128°02′W

Winter Harbour is the westernmost settlement on the west coast about 41 kilometres (25 mi) from the northwest tip of Vancouver Island, British Columbia. This unincorporated community on Winter Harbour is on the northern side of Quatsino Sound at the mouth.

== First Nations & seafarers ==
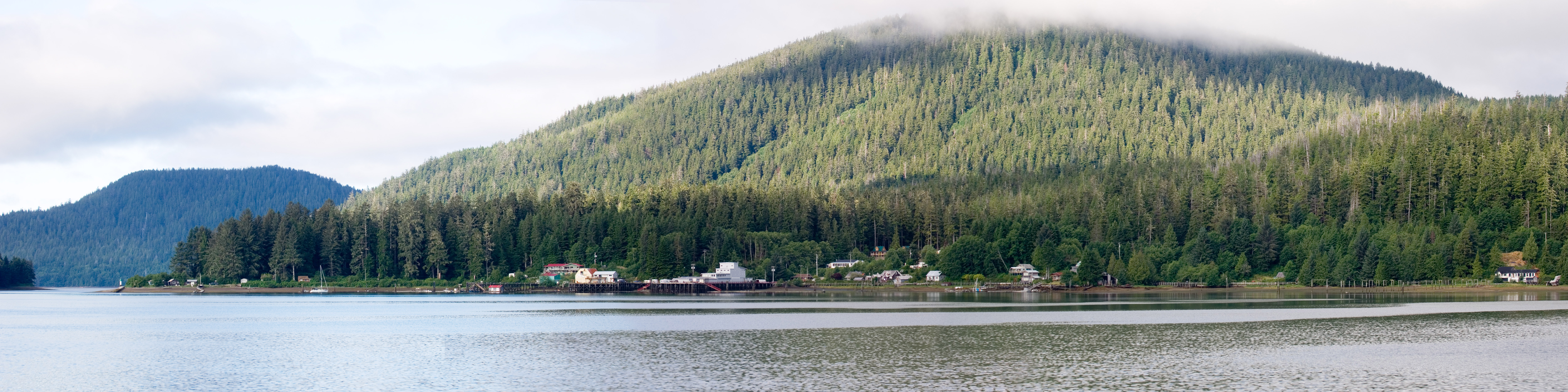
Winter Harbour as seen from a boat in the harbour

The harbour name has been used at least since 1871, being a safe natural harbour along a coast noted for turbulent seas. A number of tribes have historically occupied the area, but smallpox and intertribal warfare decimated populations in the 1800s. Nowadays, the locality falls within the Quatsino First Nation asserted territory.

== Early community ==
In 1890, the townsite for Queenstown, the former name, was laid out. The next year, Jobe (Joseph) Leeson preempted property. In 1892, the trading post, sawmill, and other buildings were erected. J.L. Leeson & Son Trading Post traded with First Nations and whaling ships. In 1904, he opened the Winter Harbour Canning Co. This crab and clam cannery was sold in 1911 and the equipment moved to the Mahatta area. In the early 1900s, dyking to create farmland occurred immediately southwest at Browning Inlet, but the benefits were short lived. The harbour name changed to Leeson Harbour in 1930 and reverted in 1947. When the population peaked in the early 1940s, the community name officially became Winter Harbour.

== Logging ==
In 1928, Albert Moore established a logging venture, operating from a floating camp. In 1950, son Bill moved W.D. Moore Logging operations on land about 3 kilometres (2 mi) from the settlement. In the 1960s, Bill founded a non-profit organization, which finances tours that expose urban teachers to forestry operations in BC. He was also a poet and avid jazz musician, using the boom years of logging in the late 1960s to help finance three 'Downtown Winter Harbour Music Festivals' in 1967, 1969, and 1971. The company has freely provided waste recycling, road grading, fire protection, and first aid for the community. In 2017, the business closed, laying off about 25 people. Eliminating the main economic anchor, the community has become almost a ghost town in winter.

== Fishing ==
In the 1970s, up to 200 boats would gather in the harbour while awaiting the opening of the Pacific salmon fishery. During the season, around 1,500 boats would pass through the harbour, which hosted numerous fish buyers. This presence disappeared with the reduction of the allowable catch for the commercial salmon industry in the late 1990s. About 15 years later, the sports fishing industry began revitalizing the community. Nowadays, guides cater to recreational fishing in Quatsino Sound and the adjacent offshore area.

== Accidents & tragedies ==
July 15, 1953: An 8-year-old boy fell from a floating dock and drowned.

April 30, 1969: A 14-year-old boy burned to death at his home.

April 7, 1977: Helicopters sprayed toxic herbicide on a school bus and a car travelling on the forestry service road to Holberg.

== Later community ==
In 2011, the census recorded 20 permanent residents, dropping to five by 2016. Nowadays, two remain. However, many of the 59 private dwellings are occupied seasonally, but the future, which is dependent upon tourism, is uncertain. The Outpost general store provides groceries, fuel, accommodation and marina moorage, but the store hours are very limited outside of summertime. Popular are the seaside boardwalk, and kayaking the Mackjack River to Raft Cove. Quatsino Provincial Park and Raft Cove Provincial Park are nearby. The coastal beaches draw surfers.
