= Raft Cove Provincial Park =

Provincial Park in British Columbia, Canada

- IUCN category II (national park)
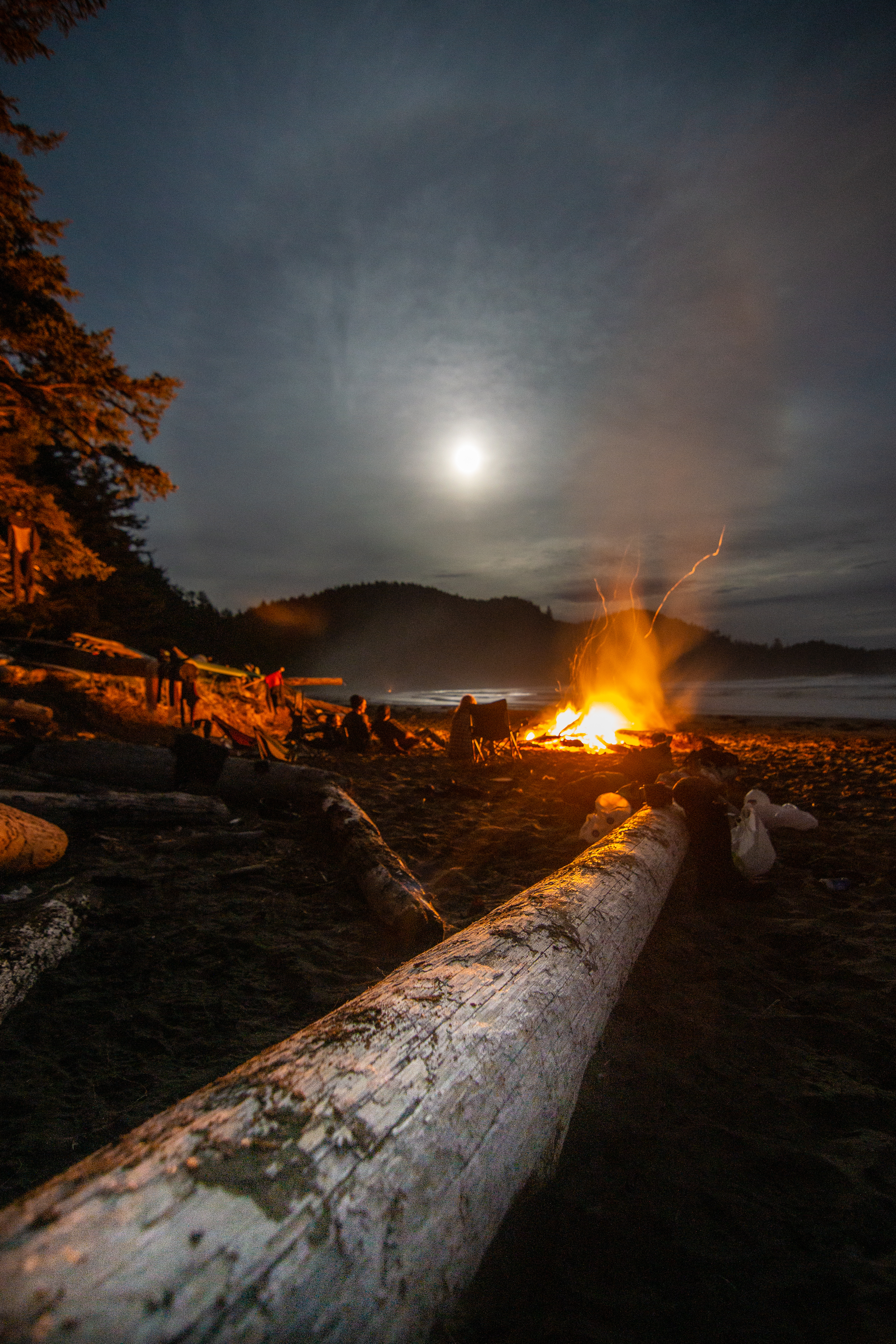
- Panoramic view

- Location within Vancouver Island Location within British Columbia
- Interactive map of Raft Cove Provincial Park
- Location: British Columbia, Canada
- Nearest city: Port Hardy
- Coordinates: 50°35′10″N 128°14′13″W
- Area: 7.87 km^{2} (3.04 sq mi)
- Established: August 13, 1990
- Governing body: BC Parks

Raft Cove Provincial Park is a provincial park in British Columbia, Canada, located south of San Josef Bay on northwestern Vancouver Island.

Raft Cove Provincial Park is located on the northwest coast of Vancouver Island, 65 km (40 mi) southwest of Port Hardy, British Columbia. The park was established on March 8, 1990. The park is 787 hectares (1,940 acres) in size, for which 444 hectares (1,100 acres) are land, and 343 hectares (850 acres) are water.

== Geography and ecology ==
Raft Cove contains features characteristic of the Nahwitti Lowland Landscape such as rounded hills, poorly drained areas, rugged coastline and western hemlock and western red cedar forests. Other park features include a river estuary and a long spit and crescent-shaped sandy beach. Raft Cove is home to a significant population of black bears, who forage along the creek beds and beach in the park. Wolves, cougars, black-tailed deer, raccoons, river otters, red squirrels, and a variety of bird species can also be found in the area.

== Recreation ==
Backcountry camping, hiking, swimming, and board-surfing in the heavy surf are available recreational activities. The ocean currents are too rough for windsurfing opportunities, but board-surfing at Raft Cove has become more popular with surfers trying to find new challenges and opportunities. The remoteness of this park, along with good waves, makes it a great, uncrowded place to surf.

== See also ==
- List of British Columbia Provincial Parks
- List of Canadian provincial parks
