= Area code 206 =

Telephone area code for Seattle, Washington

Coordinates: 47°30′N 122°25′W

Numbering plan areas of Washington, with 206 highlighted in red.

Area code 206 is a telephone area code in the North American Numbering Plan (NANP) for the U.S. state of Washington. The numbering plan area (NPA) comprises Seattle and most of its innermost suburbs. Area code 206 was first designated in 1947 for the entire state when the American Telephone and Telegraph Company (AT&T) created the first nationwide telephone numbering plan.

After reduction to just the Seattle area over the intervening decades, the numbering plan area was converted to an overlay complex in 2025, with area code 564 which also overlays 360.

== History ==
Area code 206 was one of the original North American area codes assigned in 1947, when it served the entire state of Washington. In 1957, area code 509 was assigned for the eastern two-thirds of Washington in a flash-cut, with the split roughly following the Cascade Mountains.

Despite western Washington's growth in the second half of the 20th century, this configuration remained in place for 38 years. By the start of the 1990s, however, 206 was nearing exhaustion of central office codes from proliferation of cell phones, pagers, and fax machines.

On January 15, 1995, most of the old 206 territory outside of the Seattle/Tacoma area was split off with area code 360, which was one of the first two area codes not conforming to the then-traditional N0X/N1X format (the other being 334 for southeastern Alabama).

Numerous residents in the Seattle exurbs protested about no longer being associated with 206, leading US West, now part of Lumen Technologies, to return these to 206 shortly after the split. As part of the reintegration, the cities of Des Moines and Woodway were both split between the new area codes, required by the capacity of the switching centers.

However, western Washington would have likely needed another area code before the end of the decade, as 206 was still exceeding threshold utilization even after the 360 split. The return of the Seattle exurbs, combined with the continued proliferation of cell phones, faxes, and pagers, hastened a three-way split of the 206 territory, effective on April 25, 1997. The southern portion, including Tacoma, received area code 253, while the northern portion, including Everett and the Eastside, was assigned area code 425.

On June 15, 2023, the Washington Utilities and Transportation Commission approved the expansion of the overlay complex 564 to the 206 area before central office code exhaustion was expected to occur in 2025. Area code 564 had served the 360 numbering plan area since 2017. 564 planning specifies its expansion to numbering plan areas 253 and 425 once necessary. However, ten-digit dialing has been mandatory for all of Washington west of the Cascades since 2017.

The 206/564 overlay was placed in service on June 10, 2025, at which time providers could begin activating central office codes for area code 564 in the 206/564 numbering plan area, provided that all 206 central office codes had been allocated.

== Service area ==
The numbering plan area includes the city of Seattle and its closest suburbs such as Shoreline and Lake Forest Park; Mercer, Bainbridge, and Vashon Islands; and portions of metropolitan Seattle from Des Moines to Woodway.

== See also ==
- List of North American Numbering Plan area codes
- List of Washington (state) area codes

Washington area codes: 206, 253, 360, 425, 509, 564
	North: 360/564, 425	
West: 360/564	206/564	East: 425
	South: 253	
