= Area code 425 =

Area code in Washington state, United States

Numbering plan areas of Washington, with 425 highlighted in red.

Area code 425 is a telephone area code in the North American Numbering Plan (NANP) for the suburbs north and east of Seattle in the U.S. state of Washington. The numbering plan area includes the Eastside, extending east to North Bend, north to Everett, and south to Maple Valley. It also includes the cities of Bellevue and Redmond, both major employment centers. The area code was created in 1997 in a three-way split of area code 206.

== History ==
When the American Telephone and Telegraph Company (AT&T) created the first nationwide telephone numbering plan in 1947, the state of Washington was a single numbering plan area and received the area code 206. The service area was reduced in 1957 to just the western part of the state, roughly following the Cascade Mountains. In 1995, it was further reduced to just the central areas of the Seattle–Tacoma–Everett metropolitan area with the creation of area code 360. The continued proliferation of cell phones, pagers, and fax machines placed new pressures on the numbering resources, so that after only two years further relief was mandated, resulting in a three-way split of the numbering plan area on April 27, 1997, creating area code area code 253 for the southern portion, including Tacoma, and area code 425 for the northern portion, including Everett, Renton/Maple Valley, and the exchange areas north and west of Lake Washington. A permissive dialing period was in effect until November 16, 1997.

Area code 425 is slated to participate in the complex overlay plan of area code 564, which has been active only in numbering plan area 360 since 2017, when central office code exhaustion demands relief.

== Culture ==
In the lead-up to the switchover, John Keister, on his television comedy show Almost Live!, lampooned the fact that Renton wanted to join the 425 area code to be associated with the relatively wealthy Eastside, which includes Bellevue. Renton was successful in that effort. Area code 253 is associated with relatively less affluent suburbs like Tacoma. Additionally, Pat Cashman confronted a wealthy lady in another sketch about the change of area code when she lamented that the addition of Renton to 425 will devalue her property value in the Eastside, that Renton should be in the area code 253, with such suburbs as Kent, Auburn and Tacoma. She further suggests that the phone company doesn't have their finger on the pulse of the community. Cashman says "Lady, I've got a finger I'd love to show you" and the woman leaves the stage horrified.

Korean-American rapper Jay Park, who was born in Edmonds (of the 425) and lives in Seattle (of the 206), includes a reference to both area codes in his song "Bestie."

The song "Operator" by Danish Eurodance artist Miss Papaya begins with an automated message notifying the caller that area code 206 has been changed to 425.

A Washington born singer/songwriter Cr1tter mentions the area code in her song MOXY.

== Service area ==
The numbering plan area includes the following cities:

- Ames Lake
- Bellevue
- Bothell
- Brier
- Carnation
- Duvall
- Edmonds
- Everett
- Fall City
- Issaquah
- Kenmore
- Kirkland
- Lake Stevens
- Lynnwood
- Maple Valley
- Mill Creek
- Mountlake Terrace
- Mukilteo
- Newcastle
- North Bend
- Redmond
- Renton
- Sammamish
- Snoqualmie
- Snoqualmie Pass
- Woodinville

== See also ==
- List of Washington (state) area codes
- List of North American Numbering Plan area codes
- Original North American area codes

Washington area codes: 206, 253, 360, 425, 509, 564
	North: 360/564	
West: 206/564, 360/564	425	East: 360/564, 509
	South: 206/564, 253, 360/564	
