= Western Washington =

- Region
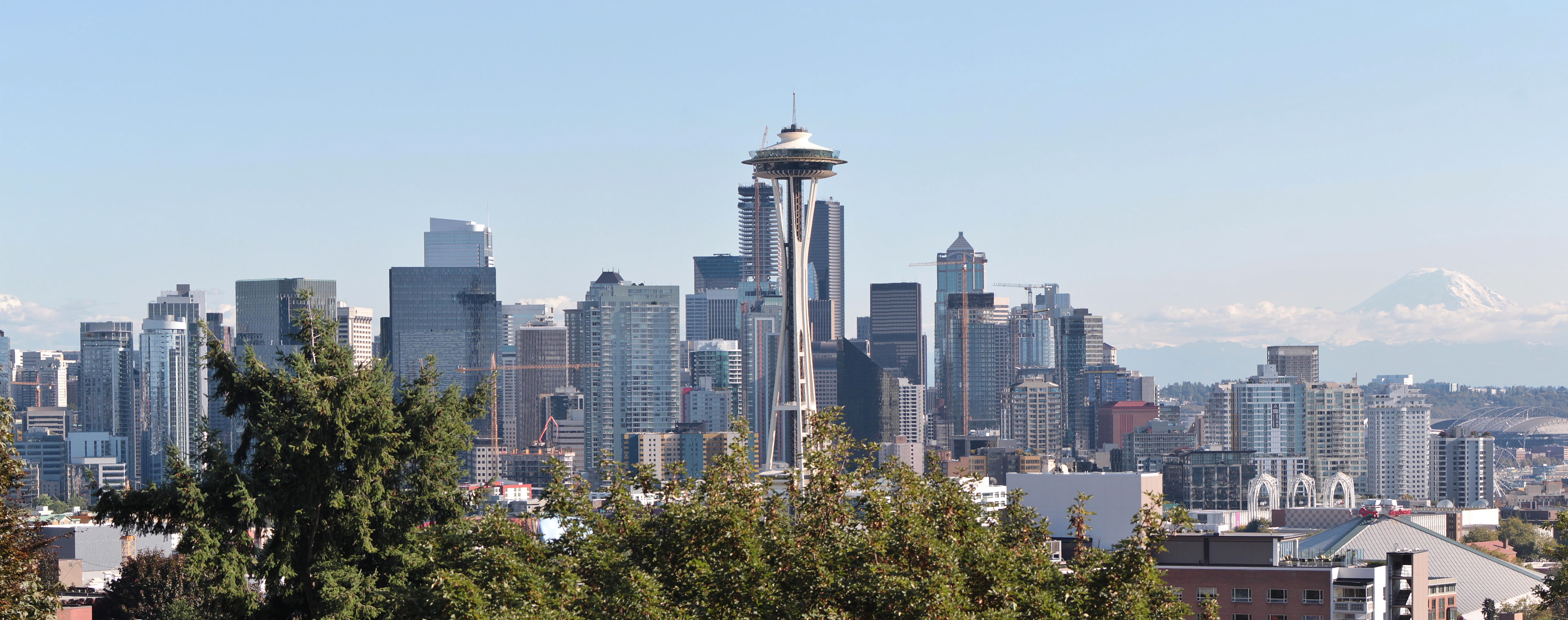
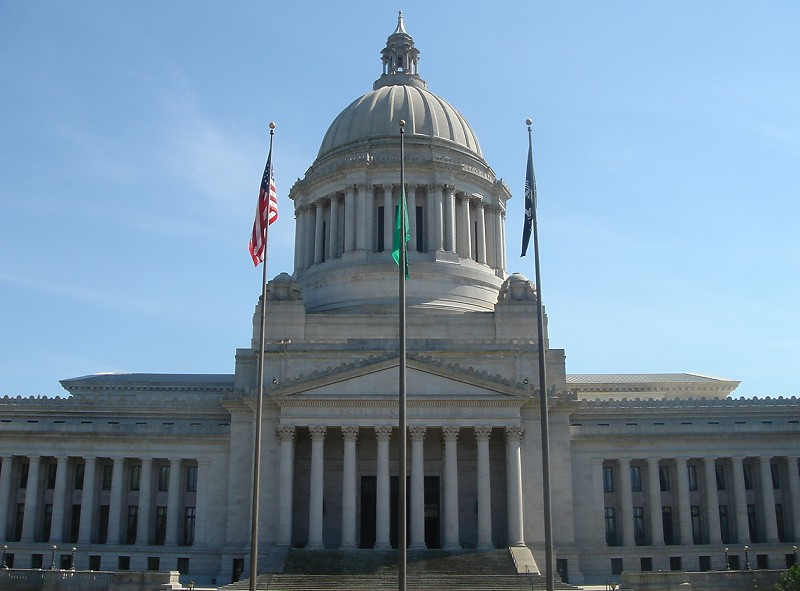
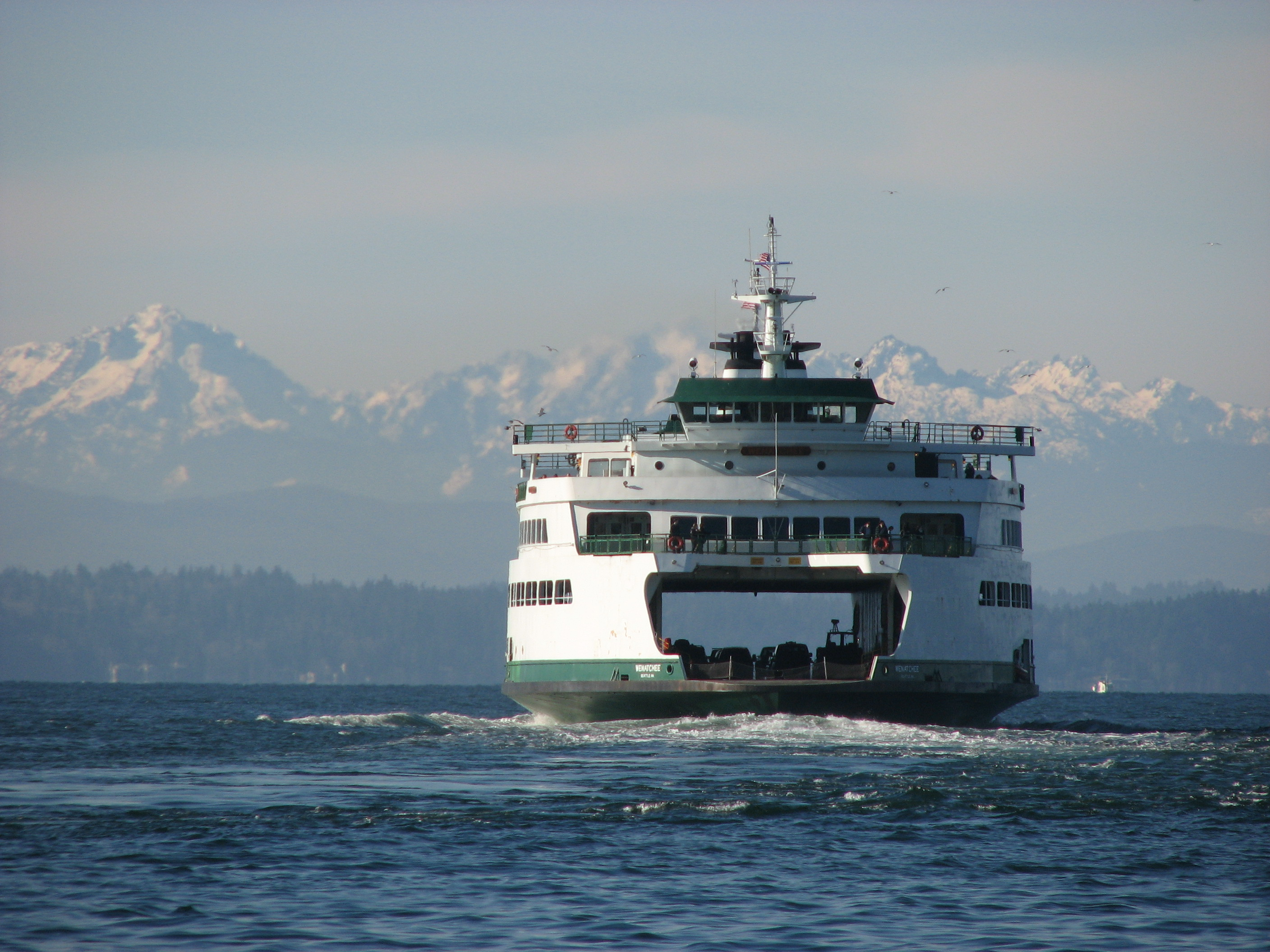
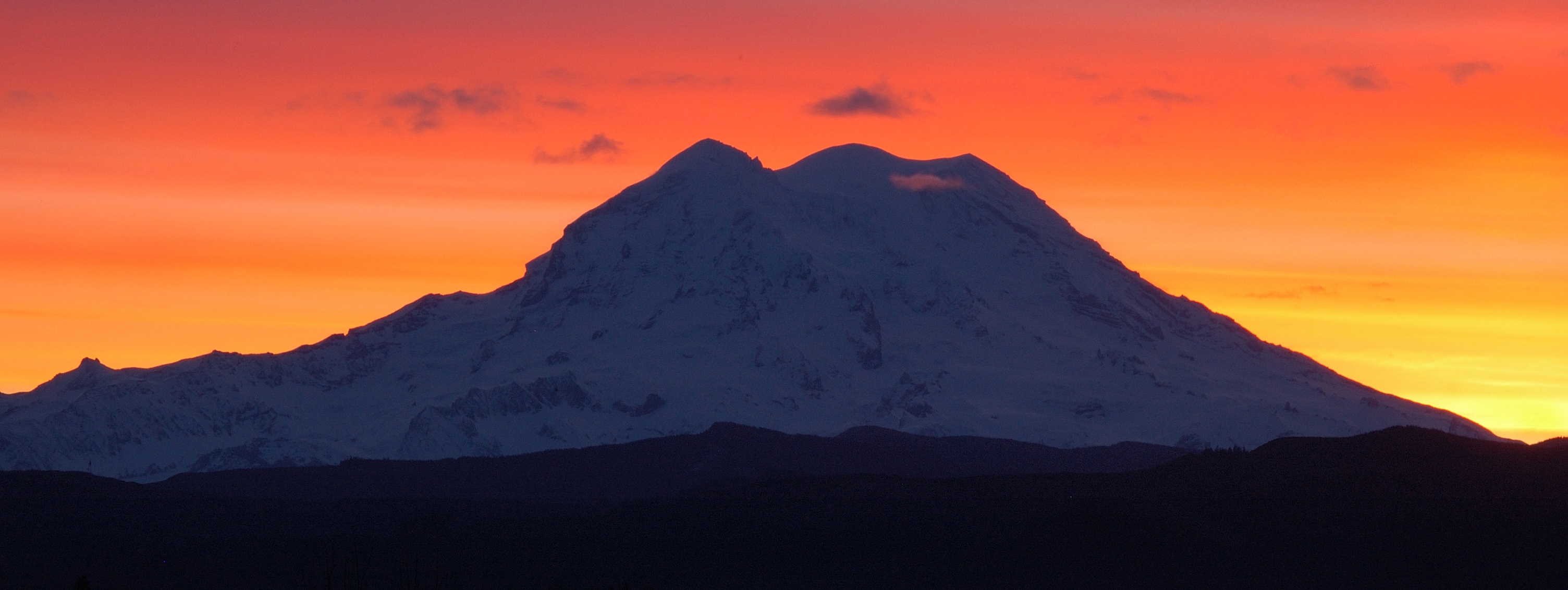
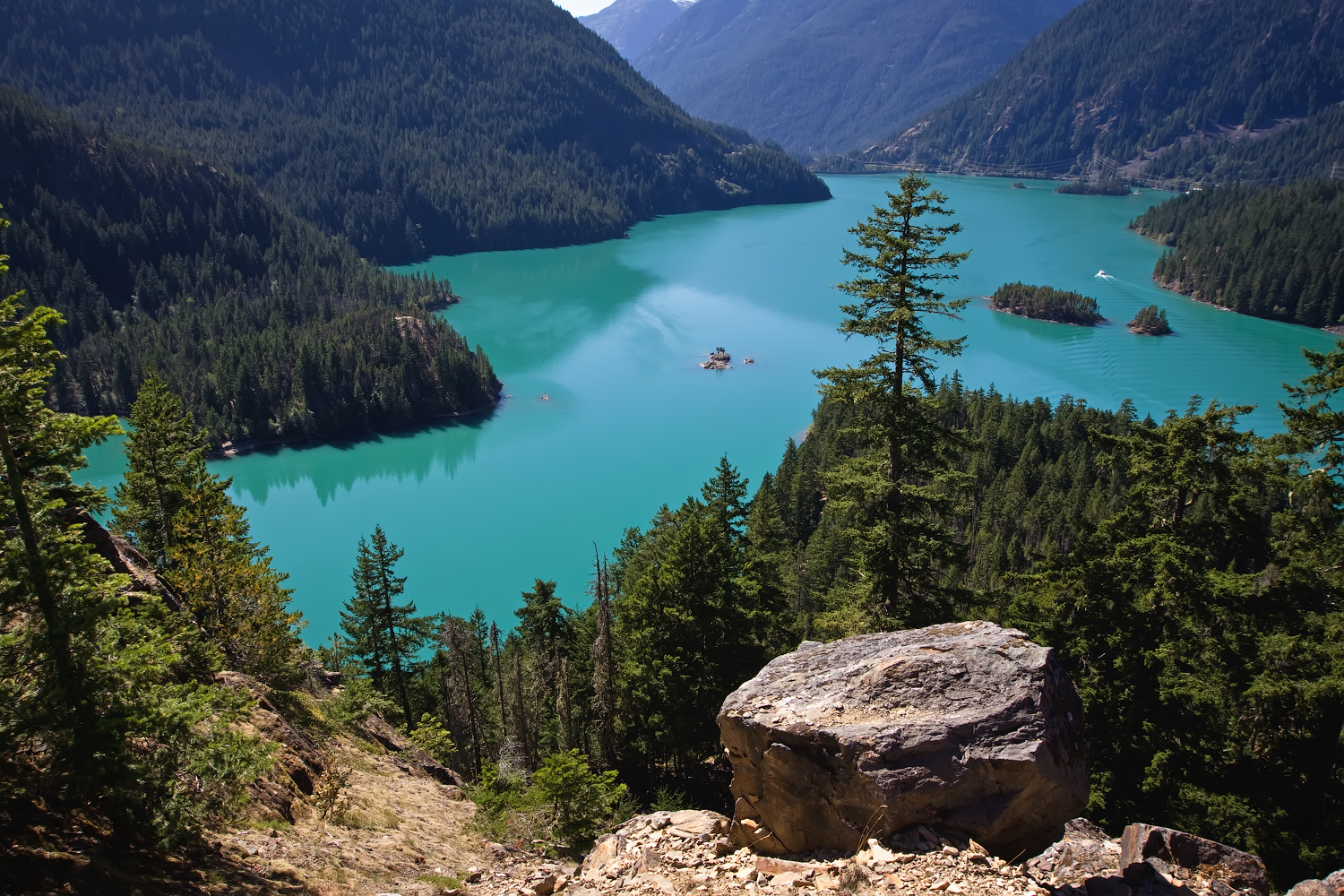
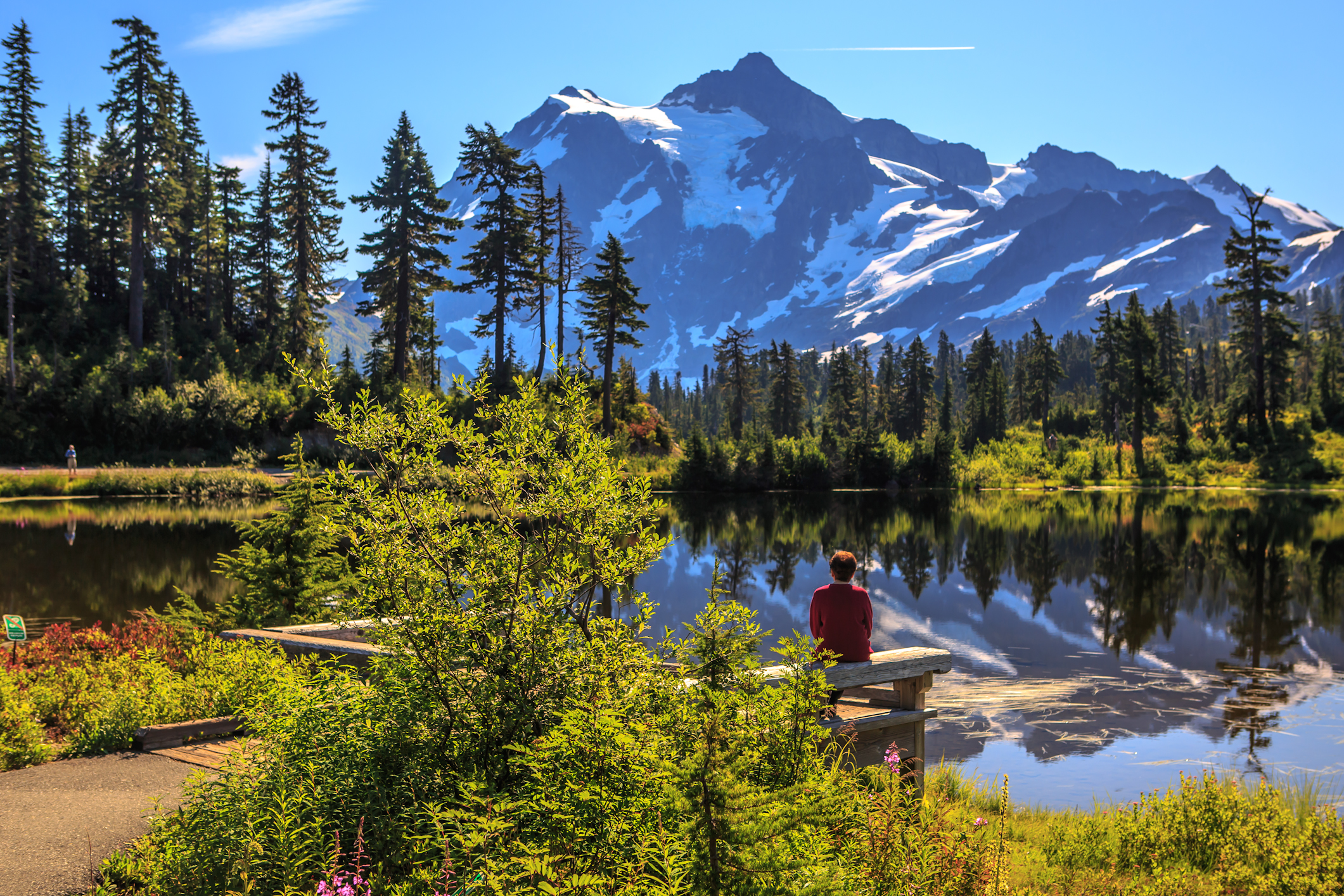
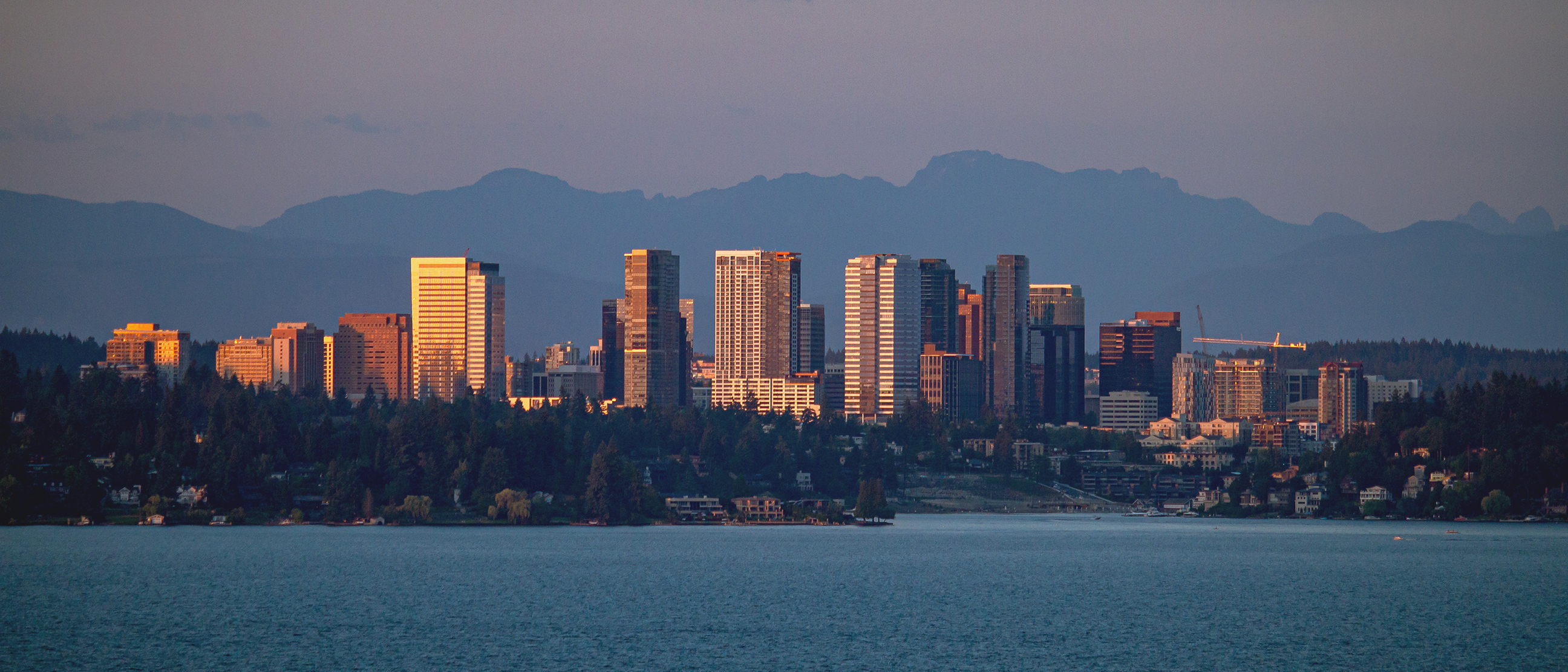
- Left-right from top: Seattle skyline, Washington State Capitol, WSF MV Wenatchee, Mount Rainier, Diablo Lake, Mount Shuksan, Bellevue skyline

- Coordinates: 48°N 122°W
- Country: United States
- State: Washington

Area
  - Land: 24,742 sq mi (64,080 km^{2})

Population (2020 census)
  - Total: 6,037,688
  - Density: 244.03/sq mi (94.219/km^{2})

Western Washington is a region of the United States defined as the area of Washington State west of the Cascade Mountains. This region is home to the state's largest city, Seattle, the state capital, Olympia, and most of the state's residents. The climate is generally far more damp and temperate than that of Eastern Washington.

== Climate ==
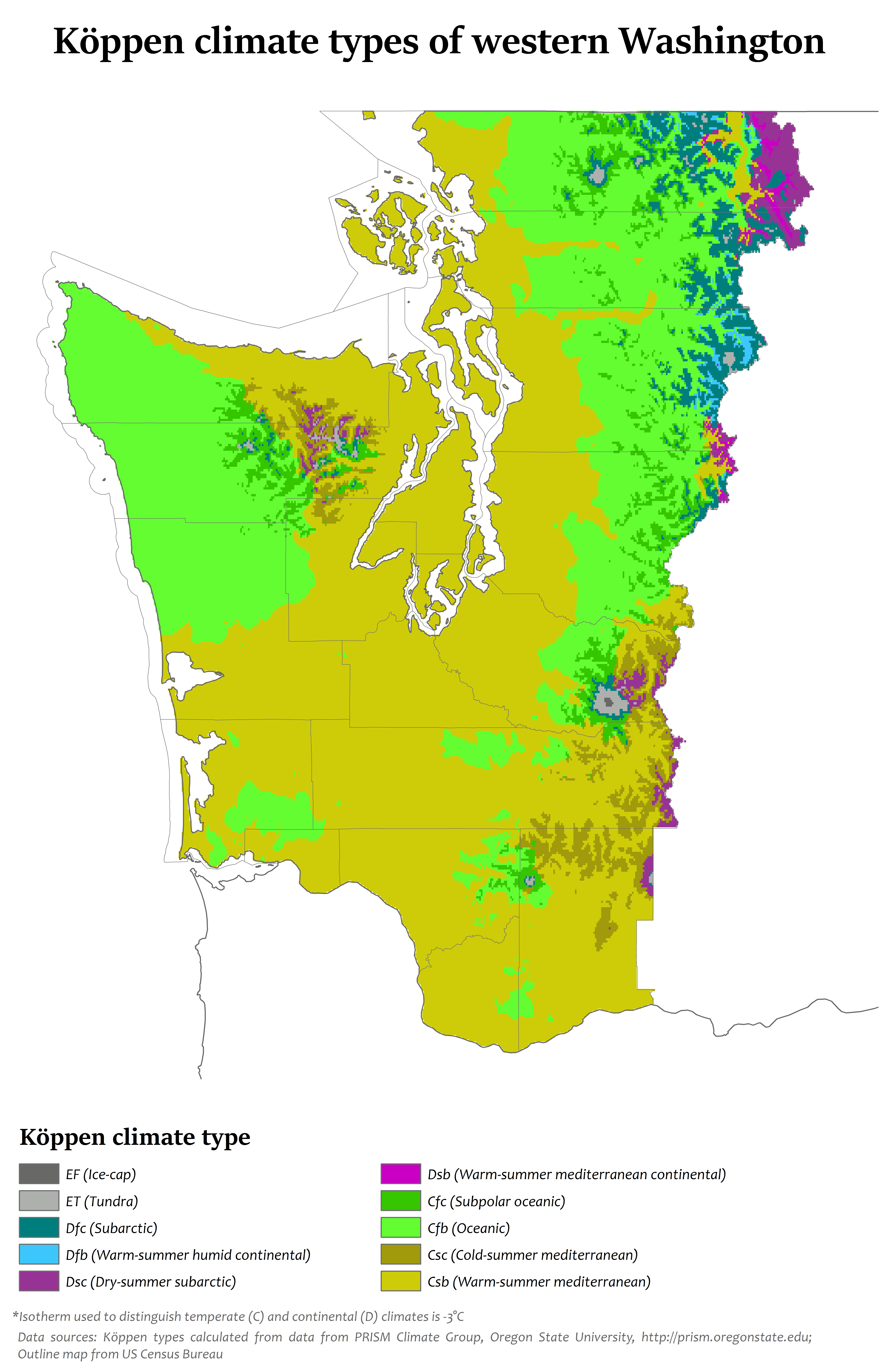
Köppen climate types in western Washington

Western Washington is known as having a far wetter climate than the eastern portion of the state, primarily due to the effects of the Cascades' rain shadow. The average location in Eastern Washington only receives an average of 46.87 centimetres (18.45 inches) of precipitation per year, whereas the average place in Western Washington receives 167.72 centimetres (66.03 inches). The average location in Western Washington gets 168 days of measurable precipitation per year.

The place that receives the most recorded precipitation is Lake Quinault on the Olympic Peninsula, with an average of 332.92 centimetres (131.07 inches) per year. The Long Beach Experimental Station has the most days of measurable precipitation, averaging 215 each year.

== Population ==
As of the 2020 census, Western Washington was home to 6,037,688 of the state's total 7,705,281 residents, making its population comparable to that of Missouri. The region has a land area of 24,742 square miles (64,080 km^{2}), making its land area comparable to that of West Virginia. The population density of Western Washington is 244.03 people per square mile (94.22 people per square kilometer).

== Counties ==
Counties in Western Washington:

- Clallam
- Clark
- Cowlitz
- Grays Harbor
- Island
- Jefferson
- King
- Kitsap
- Lewis
- Mason
- Pacific
- Pierce
- San Juan
- Skagit
- Skamania
- Snohomish
- Thurston
- Wahkiakum
- Whatcom

== Cities of note ==
Major cities in Western Washington:

- Aberdeen
- Anacortes
- Auburn
- Bellevue
- Bellingham
- Bremerton
- Everett
- Edmonds
- Federal Way
- Issaquah
- Kelso
- Kirkland
- Lake Stevens
- Longview
- Lynnwood
- Monroe
- Mount Vernon
- Oak Harbor
- Olympia
- Port Angeles
- Port Townsend
- Puyallup
- Redmond
- Renton
- Seattle
- Shelton
- Tacoma
- Vancouver
