= Washington Utilities and Transportation Commission =

Regulation agency in Washington, US

Agency overview
- Headquarters: Olympia, Washington
- Website: utc.wa.gov

The Washington Utilities and Transportation Commission (UTC) is an independent three-member board appointed by the Governor of Washington and confirmed by the Washington State Senate to six-year terms. It is based in Olympia, Washington.

The purpose of the UTC is to regulate the rates, services, and practices of privately owned utilities and transportation companies, including electric, telecommunications, natural gas, water, and solid waste collection companies, pipelines, commercial ferries, buses, and motor carriers. The UTC employs approximately 150 staff, including attorneys, economists, accountants, and engineers.

The agency is primarily an economic regulator. At the same time, the UTC also houses Washington's pipeline safety program which inspects interstate and intrastate hazardous liquid and natural gas pipeline operators as an agent for the federal Pipeline and Hazardous Materials Safety Administration under the United States Department of Transportation.

== See also ==
- Public Utilities Commission
