= Area code 253 =

Telephone area code for parts of Washington state, United States

Coordinates: 47.24°N 122.45°W

Numbering plan areas of Washington, with 253 highlighted in red.

Area code 253 is a telephone area code in the North American Numbering Plan (NANP) for a part of the U.S. state of Washington. The numbering plan area (NPA) includes cities in King County that are situated south of Seattle and the southern Puget Sound area, centered at Tacoma and extending to include the areas around Gig Harbor, Auburn, and Roy. It also serves the western half of Pierce County, as well as southern King County.

== History ==
On April 27, 1997, numbering plan area 206 in Washington was divided into three geographic service areas, due to "substantial number growth" in the Seattle area of the state. The core area around Seattle and nearby cities retained the existing area code, while the second NPA, north and east of Lake Washington received area code 425. The remaining area comprising Kent, Federal Way, Tacoma, Lakebay, Fox Island, Gig Harbor, Burley, was assigned area code 253.

Area code 253 is slated to participate in the overlay complex 564, which has been active since 2017 only in NPA 360, when central office code exhaustion demands relief.

== Service area ==
- Auburn
- Bonney Lake
- Burley
- Covington
- DuPont
- Federal Way
- Fife
- Fort Lewis, Washington
- Fox Island
- Gig Harbor
- Graham
- Kent
- Lakewood
- Lake Tapps
- McChord AFB
- Milton
- Parkland
- Puyallup
- Roy
- Sumner
- Spanaway
- Steilacoom
- Tacoma
- University Place

== See also ==
- List of Washington (state) area codes
- List of North American Numbering Plan area codes

Washington area codes: 206, 253, 360, 425, 509, 564
	North: 360/564, 206/564, 425	
West: 360/564	253	East: 360/564, 425
	South: 360/564	
