= Port Alice =

- Village
- Village of Port Alice
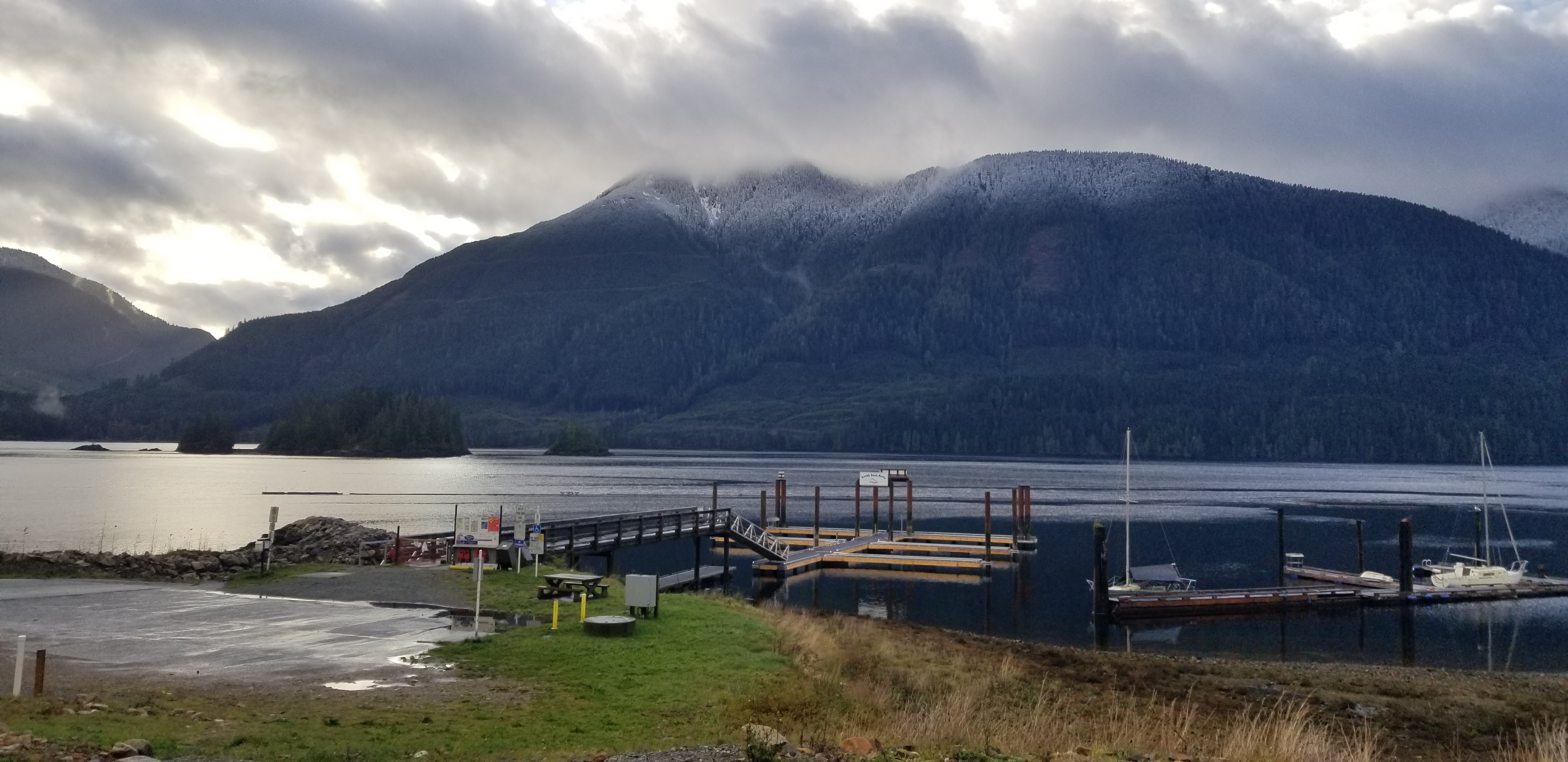
- Port Alice Rumble Beach Marina

- Location of Port Alice in British Columbia Port Alice (British Columbia)
- Coordinates: 50°25′36″N 127°29′17″W
- Country: Canada
- Province: British Columbia
- Regional district: Mount Waddington
- Founded: 1917
- District municipality: 1965
- Village: 1971

Government
  - Governing body: Port Alice Village Council

Area
  - Land: 7.03 km^{2} (2.71 sq mi)

Population (2021)
  - Total: 739
  - Density: 105.1/km^{2} (272/sq mi)
- Time zone: UTC−07:00 (PT)
- Highways: Highway 30
- Website: www.portalice.ca

Port Alice is a village of approximately 739 residents (2021 census) located on Neroutsos Inlet, southwest of Port McNeill, on Vancouver Island, originally built by Whalen Pulp and Paper Mills of Vancouver. The community is known for its natural environment, pulp mill, and salt water fishing.

== History ==
Historically, before 1750, the area was home to the Hoyalas, followed by the Koskimo people in the late 1800s.

It was named after Alice Whalen, the founders' mother. The brothers Whalen began their construction of the mill at its present site in 1917, with first pulp produced in 1918. The mill at Swanson Bay, on the Inside Passage farther north, was also a Whalen operation.

Due to heavy rainfall and the surrounding steep slopes, Port Alice experienced mud and rock slides in 1927 and 1935, which contributed to the decision to relocate the town site away from the mill in 1965. Landslides continued to occur in the area and at the new townsite in 1973, 1975, 1987, and 2010.

In 1965, Port Alice became a district municipality and was incorporated as a village on January 1, 1971.

Port Alice bears a resemblance to Port Annie, the fictional town described by Vancouver Island author Jack Hodgins in his novel The Resurrection of Joseph Bourne. The new orchid hybrid "Port Alice" has been officially listed at London England in the Royal Horticultural Society's "Book of Registered Orchid Hybrids". This slipper-type flower is the result of crossing a complex hybrid Paphiopedilum "Western Sky" with a species Paphiopedilum appletonianum.

== Geography ==
Devil's Bath, a flooded sinkhole near Port Alice, is an example of a cenote and is the largest in Canada at 359 meters in diameter and 44 meters in depth.

There are a number of hiking destinations in the area. They include Devil's Bath, Eternal Fountain, Vanishing River & Reappearing River. These are a series of ancient karst and limestone formations. The access is through dirt roads.

=== Climate ===
Port Alice has an oceanic climate (Köppen Cfb) and is one of the mildest and wettest places in Canada, receiving 3.4 metres (130 in) of actual rainfall per year and exceptionally little snow, which amounts to as much as 33 percent more rainfall than infamously wet Prince Rupert and only marginally less than Southeast Alaska's wettest cities of Ketchikan and Yakutat which each average around 3.8 metres (150 in) and receive much more snowfall.

Climate data for Port Alice
Month	Jan	Feb	Mar	Apr	May	Jun	Jul	Aug	Sep	Oct	Nov	Dec	Year
Record high °C (°F)	20.5 (68.9)	19.0 (66.2)	21.5 (70.7)	26.0 (78.8)	31.5 (88.7)	33.5 (92.3)	35.5 (95.9)	34.5 (94.1)	29.5 (85.1)	26.5 (79.7)	22.8 (73.0)	17.2 (63.0)	35.5 (95.9)
Mean daily maximum °C (°F)	7.4 (45.3)	8.0 (46.4)	9.9 (49.8)	12.2 (54.0)	15.6 (60.1)	18.1 (64.6)	20.8 (69.4)	20.9 (69.6)	18.4 (65.1)	13.3 (55.9)	9.2 (48.6)	7.0 (44.6)	13.4 (56.1)
Daily mean °C (°F)	4.9 (40.8)	5.1 (41.2)	6.4 (43.5)	8.3 (46.9)	11.3 (52.3)	13.8 (56.8)	16.1 (61.0)	16.4 (61.5)	14.1 (57.4)	10.2 (50.4)	6.6 (43.9)	4.6 (40.3)	9.8 (49.6)
Mean daily minimum °C (°F)	2.4 (36.3)	2.2 (36.0)	3.0 (37.4)	4.2 (39.6)	6.9 (44.4)	9.5 (49.1)	11.4 (52.5)	11.8 (53.2)	9.7 (49.5)	7.0 (44.6)	4.0 (39.2)	2.2 (36.0)	6.2 (43.2)
Record low °C (°F)	−12.2 (10.0)	−11.5 (11.3)	−5.5 (22.1)	−1.7 (28.9)	0.5 (32.9)	1.1 (34.0)	5.0 (41.0)	4.5 (40.1)	0.0 (32.0)	−4.0 (24.8)	−11.5 (11.3)	−12.8 (9.0)	−12.8 (9.0)
Average precipitation mm (inches)	492.2 (19.38)	354.0 (13.94)	320.4 (12.61)	258.3 (10.17)	147.3 (5.80)	100.1 (3.94)	59.5 (2.34)	94.6 (3.72)	130.2 (5.13)	417.6 (16.44)	561.4 (22.10)	491.2 (19.34)	3,426.8 (134.91)
Average rainfall mm (inches)	484.1 (19.06)	345.3 (13.59)	316.1 (12.44)	257.8 (10.15)	147.3 (5.80)	100.1 (3.94)	59.5 (2.34)	94.6 (3.72)	130.2 (5.13)	417.5 (16.44)	559.1 (22.01)	487.0 (19.17)	3,398.6 (133.80)
Average snowfall cm (inches)	8.1 (3.2)	8.7 (3.4)	4.3 (1.7)	0.5 (0.2)	0.0 (0.0)	0.0 (0.0)	0.0 (0.0)	0.0 (0.0)	0.0 (0.0)	0.1 (0.0)	2.4 (0.9)	4.2 (1.7)	28.3 (11.1)
Average precipitation days (≥ 0.2 mm)	23.3	19.7	22.7	20.1	17.0	16.0	10.4	11.9	14.6	22.2	24.1	22.8	224.7
Average rainy days (≥ 0.2 mm)	22.8	19.5	22.5	20.1	17.0	16.0	10.4	11.9	14.6	22.2	24.0	22.3	223.3
Average snowy days (≥ 0.2 cm)	2.2	2.2	1.7	0.4	0.0	0.0	0.0	0.0	0.0	0.1	0.8	1.8	9.2

== Demographics ==
In the 2021 Census of Population conducted by Statistics Canada, Port Alice had a population of 739 living in 415 of its 538 total private dwellings, a change of 11.3% from its 2016 population of 664. With a land area of 7.03 km^{2} (2.71 sq mi), it had a population density of 105.1/km^{2} (272.3/sq mi) in 2021.

Historical census populations – Port Alice

Year	Pop.	±%
1966	1,383	—
1976	1,497	+8.2%
1981	1,668	+11.4%
1986	1,387	−16.8%
1991	1,371	−1.2%
1996	1,331	−2.9%

Year	Pop.	±%
2001	1,126	−15.4%
2006	821	−27.1%
2011	805	−1.9%
2016	664	−17.5%
2021	739	+11.3%

Source: Statistics Canada

== Notable people ==
- Jason Bowen – NHL player 1992 - 1998 Philadelphia Flyers and Edmonton Oilers
- Paul Manly – Green MP, and the son of the former NDP MP Jim Manly
- Patrick Moore – founding member of Greenpeace
- Dale Walters – 1984 Olympics bronze medalist in boxing
- Daryl Sturdy - 1962 World Rowing Championships, eights 1962 British Empire and Commonwealth Games, eights 1963 Pan American Games, gold medal in eights, 1964 Tokyo Olympics, eights 1966 World Rowing Championships, coxless four 1967 Pan American Games, silver medal in pair, Royal Canadian Henley Regatta 1967 gold medal in junior singles, 1968 Mexico Olympics double

== See also ==
- List of francophone communities in British Columbia
