= List of Alone episodes =

Alone is an American reality television series on the History channel. The first, second and fourth seasons were filmed on northern Vancouver Island, British Columbia, and the third near Nahuel Huapi National Park in Patagonia, Argentina. It follows the self-documented daily struggles of 10 individuals (7 paired teams in season 4) as they survive in the wilderness for as long as possible using a limited amount of survival equipment. With the exception of medical check-ins, the participants are isolated from each other and all other humans. They may "tap out" at any time, or be removed due to failing a medical check-in. The contestant (or team in Season 4) who remains the longest wins a grand prize of $500,000. As of August 22, 2025, 146 episodes of Alone have aired.

== Series overview ==
Season	Subtitle	Location	Episodes	Originally released		Days Lasted	Winner(s)	Runner(s)-up
Season	Subtitle	Location	Episodes	First released	Last released	Days Lasted	Winner(s)	Runner(s)-up
1	—N/a	Quatsino, British Columbia	11	June 18, 2015	August 20, 2015	56	Alan Kay	Sam Larson
2	—N/a	Quatsino, British Columbia	15	April 21, 2016	July 14, 2016	66	David McIntyre	Larry Roberts
3	—N/a	Patagonia, Argentina	12	December 8, 2016	February 9, 2017	87	Zachary Fowler	Carleigh Fairchild
4	Lost & Found	Quatsino, British Columbia	12	June 15, 2017	August 17, 2017	75	Jim and Ted Baird	Pete and Sam Brockdorff
5	Redemption	Selenge Province, Mongolia	12	June 14, 2018	August 16, 2018	60	Sam Larson	Britt Ahart
6	The Arctic	Great Slave Lake, Northwest Territories	11	June 6, 2019	August 22, 2019	77	Jordan Jonas	Woniya Thibeault
7	Million Dollar Challenge	Great Slave Lake, Northwest Territories	11	June 11, 2020	August 20, 2020	100	Roland Welker	Callie Russell
8	Grizzly Mountain	Chilko Lake, British Columbia	11	June 3, 2021	August 19, 2021	74	Clay Hayes	Biko Wright
9	Polar Bear Island	Nunatsiavut, Labrador	11	May 26, 2022	August 4, 2022	78	Juan Pablo Quiñonez	Karie Lee Knoke
10	Predator Lake	Reindeer Lake, Saskatchewan	11	June 8, 2023	August 17, 2023	66	Alan Tenta	James "Wyatt" Black
11	Arctic Circle	Inuvik, Northwest Territories	12	June 13, 2024	August 29, 2024	84	William Larkham Jr.	Timber Cleghorn
12	Africa	Great Karoo, South Africa	10	June 12, 2025	August 21, 2025	34	Nathan Olsen	Kelsey Loper
13	World Championship	Richardson Mountains, Northwest Territories	13	June 17, 2026	September 9, 2026	90	Žiga Ogorelec	Aaron Barnard
Specials	—N/a	—N/a	15	April 14, 2016	June 24, 2026	—N/a	—N/a	—N/a

== Episodes ==
=== Season 1 (2015) ===
No. overall	No. in season	Title	Original release date	U.S. viewers (millions)
1	1	"And So It Begins"	June 18, 2015	1.582
2	2	"Of Wolf and Man"	June 25, 2015	1.697
3	3	"The Talons of Fear"	July 2, 2015	1.864
4	4	"Stalked"	July 9, 2015	2.082
5	5	"Winds of Hell"	July 16, 2015	2.082
6	6	"Rain of Terror"	July 23, 2015	2.181
7	7	"The Hunger"	July 30, 2015	2.092
8	8	"After the Rescue"	August 5, 2015	N/A
9	9	"The Freeze"	August 6, 2015	1.803
10	10	"Brokedown Palace"	August 13, 2015	1.939
11	11	"Triumph"	August 20, 2015	2.375

=== Season 2 (2016) ===
No. overall	No. in season	Title	Original release date	U.S. viewers (millions)
12	1	"Once More Unto the Breach"	April 21, 2016	1.520
13	2	"The Knife's Edge"	April 28, 2016	1.507
14	3	"The Beasts of the Night"	May 5, 2016	1.637
15	4	"Hunger's Grip"	May 12, 2016	1.579
16	5	"Storm Rising"	May 19, 2016	1.751
17	6	"Adrift"	May 26, 2016	1.718
18	7	"Trial By Fire"	June 9, 2016	1.597
19	8	"The Ascent"	June 16, 2016	1.678
20	9	"The Madness"	June 23, 2016	1.609
21	10	"The Gamble"	June 30, 2016	1.698
22	11	"Winter's Fury"	July 7, 2016	1.615
23	12	"Into the Abyss"	July 14, 2016	1.598
24	13	"The End Game"	July 14, 2016	1.541

=== Season 3 (2016–17) ===
No. overall	No. in season	Title	Original release date	U.S. viewers (millions)
25	1	"A New Land"	December 8, 2016	1.245
26	2	"First Blood"	December 15, 2016	1.499
27	3	"Eternal Darkness"	December 22, 2016	1.543
28	4	"Outfoxed"	December 29, 2016	1.732
29	5	"The Lone Wolf"	January 5, 2017	1.790
30	6	"Along Came a Spider"	January 12, 2017	1.855
31	7	"Hungry Beasts"	January 19, 2017	1.748
32	8	"Of Feast & Famine"	January 26, 2017	1.811
33	9	"The Point of No Return"	February 2, 2017	1.864
34	10	"Day 87"	February 9, 2017	2.117

=== Season 4 (2017) ===
No. overall	No. in season	Title	Original release date	U.S. viewers (millions)
35	1	"Divide and Conquer"	June 15, 2017	1.715
36	2	"Hell on Earth"	June 22, 2017	1.471
37	3	"Margin of Error"	June 29, 2017	1.540
38	4	"The Last Mile"	July 6, 2017	1.538
39	5	"Double or Nothing"	July 13, 2017	1.434
40	6	"Thicker Than Water"	July 20, 2017	1.539
41	7	"Hooked"	July 27, 2017	1.638
42	8	"Flare-Up"	August 3, 2017	1.459
43	9	"My Brother's Keeper"	August 10, 2017	1.410
44	10	"Flesh and Blood"	August 17, 2017	1.378
45	11	"Tales From the Island"	August 17, 2017	0.787

=== Season 5 (2018) ===
No. overall	No. in season	Title	Original release date	U.S. viewers (millions)
46	1	"Redemption"	June 14, 2018	1.409
47	2	"The Haunting"	June 21, 2018	1.296
48	3	"The Serpent"	June 28, 2018	1.398
49	4	"Mongolia's Wrath"	July 5, 2018	1.188
50	5	"The Bowels Of Hell"	July 12, 2018	1.253
51	6	"Of Mice And Men"	July 19, 2018	1.657
52	7	"Desperate Measures"	July 26, 2018	1.661
53	8	"Slayer II"	August 2, 2018	1.350
54	9	"Starvation's Shadow"	August 9, 2018	1.429
55	10	"Cold War"	August 16, 2018	1.563

=== Season 6 (2019) ===
No. overall	No. in season	Title	Original release date	U.S. viewers (millions)
56	1	"Icebreaker"	June 6, 2019	1.153
57	2	"Tainted"	June 13, 2019	1.281
58	3	"Up in Flames"	June 20, 2019	1.321
59	4	"The Moose"	June 27, 2019	1.439
60	5	"The Kill"	July 11, 2019	1.168
61	6	"Ablaze"	July 18, 2019	1.168
62	7	"Night Raider"	July 25, 2019	1.141
63	8	"Out Cold"	August 1, 2019	1.068
64	9	"The Ice Cometh"	August 8, 2019	0.989
65	10	"Thin Ice"	August 15, 2019	1.358
66	11	"Fire and Ice"	August 22, 2019	1.384

=== Season 7 (2020) ===
No. overall	No. in season	Title	Original release date	U.S. viewers (millions)
67	1	"Million Dollar Mistake"	June 11, 2020	1.127
68	2	"The Rock House"	June 18, 2020	1.285
69	3	"That Was No Bunny"	June 25, 2020	1.251
70	4	"The Fly"	July 2, 2020	1.362
71	5	"The Rock"	July 9, 2020	1.374
72	6	"The Musk Ox"	July 16, 2020	1.332
73	7	"Snared"	July 23, 2020	1.274
74	8	"Up In Smoke"	July 30, 2020	1.252
75	9	"The Wolves"	August 6, 2020	1.237
76	10	"Pins and Needles"	August 13, 2020	1.546
77	11	"Over the Edge"	August 20, 2020	1.335

=== Season 8 (2021) ===
No. overall	No. in season	Title	Original release date	U.S. viewers (millions)
78	1	"The Hunted"	June 3, 2021	1.338
79	2	"Open Season"	June 10, 2021	1.561
80	3	"Chewed Up"	June 17, 2021	1.396
81	4	"Far From Home"	June 24, 2021	1.419
82	5	"The Buck"	July 1, 2021	1.406
83	6	"Smoked"	July 8, 2021	1.362
84	7	"Surrounded"	July 15, 2021	1.705
85	8	"The Grizzly"	July 22, 2021	1.507
86	9	"The Troll"	August 5, 2021	N/A
87	10	"All In"	August 12, 2021	N/A
88	11	"The Reckoning"	August 19, 2021	N/A
89	12	"Ultimate Moments"	August 19, 2021	N/A

=== Season 9 (2022) ===
No. overall	No. in season	Title	Original release date	U.S. viewers (millions)
90	1	"Drop Shock"	May 26, 2022	N/A
91	2	"Consequences"	June 2, 2022	N/A
92	3	"The Law of the Land"	June 9, 2022	N/A
93	4	"The Beaver"	June 16, 2022	N/A
94	5	"The Land Giveth…"	June 23, 2022	N/A
95	6	"The Weasel"	June 30, 2022	N/A
96	7	"The Birds"	July 7, 2022	N/A
97	8	"Gut Feeling"	July 14, 2022	N/A
98	9	"The Ice Up"	July 21, 2022	N/A
99	10	"Winter's Grasp"	July 28, 2022	N/A
100	11	"Fight, Flight or Freeze"	August 4, 2022	N/A

=== Season 10 (2023) ===
No. overall	No. in season	Title	Original release date	U.S. viewers (millions)
101	1	"Game On"	June 8, 2023	N/A
102	2	"Ties That Bind"	June 15, 2023	N/A
103	3	"Growing Pains"	June 22, 2023	N/A
104	4	"Lake of Thieves"	June 29, 2023	N/A
105	5	"Spirit Bear"	July 6, 2023	N/A
106	6	"King's Gambit"	July 13, 2023	N/A
107	7	"Aftermath"	July 20, 2023	N/A
108	8	"Infestation"	July 27, 2023	N/A
109	9	"Splintered"	August 3, 2023	N/A
110	10	"Rats"	August 10, 2023	N/A
111	11	"By Any Means"	August 17, 2023	N/A

=== Season 11 (2024) ===
No. overall	No. in season	Title	Original release date	U.S. viewers (millions)
112	1	"Enter The Circle"	June 13, 2024	N/A
113	2	"Opportunity Cost"	June 20, 2024	N/A
114	3	"Fortune"	June 27, 2024	N/A
115	4	"Legacy"	July 11, 2024	N/A
116	5	"Something In The Air"	July 18, 2024	N/A
117	6	"Murphy's Law"	July 25, 2024	N/A
118	7	"One Pike at a Time"	August 1, 2024	N/A
119	8	"The Marten Chronicles"	August 8, 2024	N/A
120	9	"The Wormhole"	August 15, 2024	N/A
121	10	"Symphony of Solitude"	August 22, 2024	N/A
122	11	"Collapse"	August 29, 2024	N/A
123	12	"Into the Dark"	August 29, 2024	N/A

=== Season 12 (2025) ===
No. overall	No. in season	Title	Original release date	U.S. viewers (millions)
124	1	"The Land of Great Thirst"	June 12, 2025	0.501
125	2	"Best Laid Plans"	June 19, 2025	0.467
126	3	"Thirst Trap"	June 26, 2025	0.478
127	4	"Finding a Foothold"	July 11, 2025	0.502
128	5	"The Tempest"	July 18, 2025	0.440
129	6	"Purpose"	July 25, 2025	0.461
130	7	"Echoes of Emptiness"	August 1, 2025	0.444
131	8	"Weak Spot"	August 8, 2025	0.423
132	9	"The Promised Land"	August 14, 2025	0.517
133	10	"No Regrats"	August 21, 2025	0.489

=== Season 13 (2026) ===
No. overall	No. in season	Title	Original release date	U.S. viewers (millions)
134	1	"Worlds Collide: Part 1"	June 17, 2026	0.388
135	2	"Worlds Collide: Part 2"	June 24, 2026	0.413
136	3	"Building Momentum"	July 1, 2026	0.421
137	4	"Cold Omen"	July 8, 2026	N/A
138	5	"Thin Margins"	July 15, 2026	N/A
139	6	"Balancing Act"	July 22, 2026	N/A
140	7	"Natural Order"	July 29, 2026	N/A
141	8	"Tides of Fortune"	August 5, 2026	N/A
142	9	"Icebound"	August 12, 2026	N/A
143	10	"No Safe Haven"	August 19, 2026	TBD
144	11	"Fire and Famine"	August 26, 2026	TBD
145	12	"Subzero"	September 2, 2026	TBD
146	13	"Worlds Apart"	September 9, 2026	TBD

=== Specials ===
No.	Title	Original release date	U.S. viewers (millions)
1	"Making the Cut: Season 2"	April 14, 2016	1.096
"The farther one gets into the wilderness, the greater is the attraction of its lonely freedom." – Theodore Roosevelt
2	"Reunion Special"	July 21, 2016	0.788
3	"Making The Cut: Season 3"	December 8, 2016	0.997
"There are no limits. There are only plateaus, and you must not stay there, you must go beyond them." – Bruce Lee
4	"Season 3 Reunion Special"	February 9, 2017	1.328
5	"Making the Cut: Season 4"	June 8, 2017	1.278
"A brother is a friend given by nature" – Jean Baptiste Legouve
6	"Making the Cut: Season 5"	June 7, 2018	0.820
"Chance only favors those who court her." – Charles Nicolle
7	"Season 5 Reunion Special"	August 23, 2018	0.858
8	"Before The Drop (Season 10)"	June 8, 2023	N/A
9	"Before The Drop (Season 11)"	June 13, 2024	N/A
10	"The Rides Back (Season 11)"	August 30, 2024	N/A
11	"The Complete Shelters (Season 11)"	August 30, 2024	N/A
12	"Before the Drop (Season 12)"	June 12, 2025	N/A
13	"Most Dangerous Moments (Season 12)"	June 19, 2025	N/A
14	"Before the Drop (Season 13)"	June 17, 2026	N/A
15	"The Winner's Journey"	June 24, 2026	N/A
