= Alone: Frozen =

Spin-off of the American survival TV show Alone

- Genre: Reality; Survival
- Country of origin: United States
- Original language: English
- No. of seasons: 1
- No. of episodes: 8

Production
- Production companies: Leftfield Pictures

Original release
- Network: History
- Release: August 11 – September 22, 2022

Related
- Alone (TV series)

Alone: Frozen is a spin-off season of Alone that was set on the coast of Labrador, Canada.

== Format ==
Six contestants from previous seasons of Alone (USA) were asked to survive in the wilderness a second time, similar to Season 5. Compared to a typical season, contestants were dropped off on location much closer to the start of extreme winter weather and the prize money of $500,000 was to be shared between all contestants who survived 50 days in the wilderness.

== Episodes ==
No. in season	Title	Original release date	U.S. viewers (millions)
1	"50 Day Freeze"	August 11, 2022	N/A
2	"Frost Bound"	August 18, 2022	N/A
3	"The Edge"	August 25, 2022	N/A
4	"Bone Cold"	September 1, 2022	N/A
5	"Outfoxed"	September 15, 2022	N/A
6	"On Thin Ice"	September 15, 2022	N/A
7	"The Last Hope"	September 22, 2022	N/A
8	"The Bitter End"	September 22, 2022	N/A

== Results ==
Name	Age	Gender	Hometown	Country	Original Season	Status	Reason they tapped out	Ref.
Woniya Thibeault	45	Female	Grass Valley, CA	USA	Season 6	50 days	Winner	
Michelle Finn	47	Female	Cherryfield, ME	USA	Season 8	38 days	Concerned about her eye health.	
Callie Russell	33	Female	Flathead Valley, MT	USA	Season 7	26 days	No food in traps, an ultimatum she set for herself.	
Amós Rodriguez	42	Male	Indianapolis, IN	USA	Season 7	19 days	Believed it to be best for his health.	
Greg Ovens	58	Male	Canal Flats, BC	Canada	Season 3	6 days	Anxiety, memories of Patagonia.	
Mark D'Ambrosio	37	Male	Vancouver, WA	USA	Season 7	5 days	Missed family.	
