= Along Came a Spider =

"Along came a spider" is a line from "Little Miss Muffet".

It may refer to:

== Music ==
- Along Came a Spider (album), 2008 album by Alice Cooper
- Along Came a Spider, 2018 album by the band Spider Rockets

== Television ==
- "Along Came a Spider", 2017 episode of Alone
- "Along Came a Spider", 1962 episode of The Defenders
- "Along Came a Spider" (Lioness), a 2024 episode
- "Along Came a Spider", 1968 episode of The Outsider
- "Along Came a Spider", 2015 episode of Red vs. Blue
- Along Came a Spider, a 1970 ABC TV film starring Suzanne Pleshette
- "Along Came a Spider", an episode of Transformers: Animated

== Other uses ==
- Along Came a Spider (novel), 1993 novel by James Patterson
  - Along Came a Spider (film), 2001 film adaption of the novel
- Venom: Along Came A Spider, 1996 series of the comic book Venom
