= Alone season 1 =

Alone
- Season 1
- No. of contestants: 10
- Winner: Alan Kay
- Runner-up: Sam Larson
- No. of episodes: 11

Release
- Original network: History
- Original release: June 18 – August 27, 2015

Season chronology
- Next → Season 2

The first season of Alone premiered on June 18, 2015 on History and concluded on August 27, with 10 episodes and 1 special recap/behind-the-scenes episode. Each season follows the self-documented daily struggles of 10 individuals as they survive alone in the wilderness for as long as possible using a limited amount of survival equipment. With the exception of medical check-ins, the participants are isolated from each other and all other humans. They may "tap out" at any time, or be removed due to failing a medical check-in. The contestant who remains the longest wins a grand prize of $500,000.

The first season was won by Alan Kay, who lost over 46 pounds during the course of the season. His staple foods were limpets and seaweed. He also consumed mussels, crab, fish and slugs.

== Episodes ==
| No. overall | No. in season | Title | Original release date | U.S. viewers (millions) |
|---|---|---|---|---|
| 1 | 1 | "And So It Begins" | June 18, 2015 | 1.582 |
Beginning quote: "I went to the woods because I wished to live deliberately... and see if I could not learn what it had to teach." - Henry David Thoreau
| 2 | 2 | "Of Wolf and Man" | June 25, 2015 | 1.697 |
"If you live among wolves you have to act like a wolf." - Nikita Khrushchev
| 3 | 3 | "The Talons of Fear" | July 2, 2015 | 1.864 |
"Extinction is the rule. Survival is the exception." - Carl Sagan
| 4 | 4 | "Stalked" | July 9, 2015 | 2.082 |
"Hunger, love, pain, fear are some of those inner forces which rule the individual's instinct for self preservation." - Albert Einstein
| 5 | 5 | "Winds of Hell" | July 16, 2015 | 2.082 |
"The strong survive, but the courageous triumph." - Michael Scott
| 6 | 6 | "Rain of Terror" | July 23, 2015 | 2.181 |
"Extraordinary people survive under the most terrible circumstances and they become more extraordinary because of it." - Robertson Davies
| 7 | 7 | "The Hunger" | July 30, 2015 | 2.092 |
"Humans are not the fastest or the strongest animals on the planet, but when it comes to survival, we have had the unique advantage of being clever." - David Perlmutter
| 8 | 8 | "After the Rescue" | August 5, 2015 | N/A |
"This is the chance in a lifetime. But it's not worth dying over." - Wayne
| 9 | 9 | "The Freeze" | August 6, 2015 | 1.803 |
"If quick, I survive. If not quick, I am lost. This is 'death.'" - Sun Tzu
| 10 | 10 | "Brokedown Palace" | August 13, 2015 | 1.939 |
"Does anything in nature despair except man?" - May Sarton
| 11 | 11 | "Triumph" | August 20, 2015 | 2.375 |
"Courage is not having the strength to go on; it is going on when you don't have the strength." - Theodore Roosevelt

== Results ==
Lucas Miller enjoyed his time on the show and was selected based on his work as a wilderness therapist. His most difficult experience with the show was making honest confessions to the camera. Sam Larson described his time on the show as "playing in the woods". He set a goal for himself to last 50 days. After he reached his goal, a large storm hit the island, which Larson described as being larger than any he had seen and prompting his decision to leave the island. Larson said that the loneliness and solitude took the most time to adjust to, and that his preparation for the show mostly consisted of mental preparation.

Alone season one contestants
| Name | Age | Gender | Hometown | Country | Status | Reason they tapped out | Ref. |
|---|---|---|---|---|---|---|---|
| Alan Kay | 40 | Male | Blairsville, Georgia | United States | Winner - 56 days | Victor | |
| Sam Larson | 22 | Male | Lincoln, Nebraska | United States | 55 days | Lost the mind game | |
| Mitch Mitchell | 34 | Male | Bellingham, Massachusetts | United States | 43 days | Realized he should actually be around for his mother's cancer | |
| Lucas Miller | 32 | Male | Quasqueton, Iowa | United States | 39 days | Felt content with what he had done | |
| Dustin Feher | 37 | Male | Pittsburgh, Pennsylvania | United States | 8 days | Fear of storm | |
| Brant McGee | 44 | Male | Albemarle, North Carolina | United States | 6 days | Consuming salt water | |
| Wayne Russell | 46 | Male | Saint John, New Brunswick | Canada | 4 days | Fear of bears | |
| Joe Robinet | 24 | Male | Windsor, Ontario | Canada | 4 days | Loss of flint | |
| Chris Weatherman | 41 | Male | Umatilla, Florida | United States | 36 Hours | Fear of wolves | |
| Josh Chavez | 31 | Male | Jackson, Ohio | United States | 12 hours | Fear of bears | |

== Production ==
=== Location and filming ===
Location of Quatsino in British Columbia

The season was shot in Quatsino Territory, located near Port Hardy, British Columbia.

Quatsino is a small hamlet of 91 people located on Quatsino Sound in Northern Vancouver Island, Canada, only accessible by boat or float plane. Its nearest neighbour is Coal Harbour, to the east, about 20 minutes away by boat, and Port Alice, to the south, about 40 minutes away by boat. The largest town in the region, Port Hardy, is located about an hour northeast by boat and vehicle.
