= And So It Begins =

And So It Begins or So It Begins may refer to:

== Music ==
- And So It Begins, a 2008 album by Joshua Bartholomew
- And So It Begins, a 2016 album by Eva Celia
- "And So It Begins", from the soundtrack of 1980 film Loving Couples
- So It Begins, a 2007 album by Profugus Mortis
- And So It Begins, a 2023 EP by Blanks

== Television ==
- "And So It Begins...", the American name of the first episode of the TV series Digimon Adventure
- "And So It Begins", an episode of Reckless (American TV series)
- "And So It Begins", an episode of TV series Alone
- "And So It Begins", an episode of TV series 90 Day Fiancé: Before the 90 Days
- "So It Begins" (Arrow), 6th episode of the 5th season of Arrow
- "So It Begins", an episode of TV show Alias (season 1)

== Other uses ==
- And So It Begins, a 2024 Filipino-American documentary film by Ramona Diaz
- And So It Begins, a 2018 novel by Rachel Abbott
