= Alone (TV series) =

American survival reality television series

- Genre: Reality; Survival
- Country of origin: United States
- Original language: English
- No. of seasons: 13
- No. of episodes: 146 (list of episodes)

Production
- Executive producers: Russ McCarroll; Zachary Behr; Gretchen Palek; Shawn Witt; Zachary Green; Ryan Pender; Dan Bree; Rafael Monserrate; David George; Kiran Malhotra; Brent Montgomery
- Running time: 60–120 minutes
- Production companies: Leftfield Pictures

Original release
- Network: History
- Release: June 18, 2015 – present

Alone is an American survival competition series on History, formerly the History Channel. It follows the self-documented daily struggles of 10 individuals (seven paired teams in season 4) as they survive alone in the wilderness for as long as possible using a limited amount of survival equipment. With the exception of medical check-ins, the participants are isolated from each other and all other humans. They may withdraw from the competition ("tap out") at any time, or be removed due to failing a medical check-in. The contestant who remains the longest wins a grand prize of $500,000 (USD) (increased to $1 million for season 7). The seasons have been filmed across a range of remote locations, usually on first nations-controlled lands, including northern Vancouver Island, British Columbia, Nahuel Huapi National Park in Argentina, Patagonia, Northern Mongolia, Great Slave Lake in the Northwest Territories, and Chilko Lake in interior British Columbia.

The series premiered on June 18, 2015. On August 19, before the finale of season 1, it was announced that the series had been renewed for a second season, which began production in the fall of 2015 on Vancouver Island, Canada. Season 2 premiered on April 21, 2016. Season 3 was filmed in the second quarter of 2016 in Patagonia, Argentina, and premiered on December 8. One day before the season 3 premiere, History announced that casting had begun for season 4. Season 4 was set in Northern Vancouver Island with a team dynamic and premiered on June 8, 2017. Season 5 was set in Northern Mongolia and allowed losers from previous seasons to return and compete. It premiered on June 14, 2018. Season 6 premiered on June 6, 2019 and featured ten all-new contestants between the ages of 31 and 55. It was set just south of the Arctic Circle on a lake in the Northwest Territories of Canada.

The seventh season premiered on June 11, 2020. Participants attempted to survive for 100 days in the Arctic in order to win a $1 million prize. Season 8 was set on Chilko Lake, in British Columbia in the Coast Mountains in the Pacific Coast Range of western North America. Season 9 then took the show across the country to northern Labrador.

The tenth season premiered on June 8, 2023. The eleventh season was set in the Arctic circle, in Inuvik, Northwest Territories. This was followed by the twelfth season set in the Karoo Desert in South Africa, the hottest location for the series.

Spin-offs and international versions of the series have also since been made.

== Format and rules ==
=== General rules in all seasons ===
Contestants are dropped off in a remote wilderness area, far enough apart to ensure that they will not come in contact with one another. The process begins in mid- to late autumn; this adds time pressure to the survival experience as the approaching winter causes temperatures to drop and food to become scarce. Although terrains may differ in each contestant's location, the drop-off zones are assessed in advance to ensure a similar distribution of local resources is available to each contestant.

Contestants each select 10 items of survival gear from a pre-approved list of 40, and are issued a kit of standard equipment, clothing and first aid/emergency supplies. They are also given a set of cameras to document their daily experiences and emotions. Attempting to live in the wild for as long as possible, the contestants must find food, build shelters, and endure deep isolation, physical deprivation and psychological stress.

Contestants who wish to withdraw from the competition for any reason (referred to as "tapping out") may signal a rescue crew using a provided satellite telephone. In addition, medical professionals conduct periodic health checks on the contestants and may, at their discretion, disqualify and evacuate anyone they feel is unable to continue participating safely. The last remaining contestant wins a $500,000 (USD) cash prize. Contestants are warned that the show might last for up to a year.

=== Pairs format (Season 4) ===
Season 4 was also filmed in Northern Vancouver Island but included a team dynamic. Fourteen contestants, consisting of seven family-member pairs, were individually dropped off in remote areas of Northern Vancouver Island. The two members of each team chose 10 items of survival gear to be equally divided between them. The team chose one member to be taken to a campsite; the other began approximately 10 mi (16.09 km) away and was required to hike to the site, using only a compass and bearing to find the way. If either member tapped out or was medically evacuated, his/her partner was disqualified as well. The last remaining team won the $500,000 (USD) prize.

=== Season 5 ===
Season 5 contestants were selected from non-winning contestants from Seasons 1 through 4. The rules were otherwise similar to Seasons 1 through 3.

=== Season 7 ===
For Season 7, the contestants attempted to survive for 100 days in order to win a grand prize of $1 million. In an "Alone: Tales from the Arctic" segment at the end of each episode, host Colby Donaldson spoke post-season to the contestants featured in that episode about what occurred, accompanied by "never before seen footage."

=== Season 8 ===
Season 8 was filmed in fall 2020 on the shores of Chilko Lake, British Columbia, a high-altitude glacial-fed lake on the dry eastern side of the Coast Mountains. The season reverts to the original format of the show, with the last person standing (regardless of time frame) declared the winner and awarded $500,000 (USD).

=== Season 9 ===
Season 9 was filmed in fall 2021 and set in the harsh weather conditions of Northeastern Labrador. The season featured two new digital content series: "The Ride Back", which focused on the emotions of the participants ahead of tapping out, and "Shelter From the Storm", an in-depth look at the ingenious shelters the participants build. Also, for the first time, the participants have to theoretically contend with a prey-stalking predator, the polar bear.

=== Season 10 ===
Season 10 is filmed in Reindeer Lake, Saskatchewan, near the Manitoba border.

=== Season 11 ===
Season 11 is filmed the farthest north the show has ever been, 125 miles into the Arctic Circle on the coast of the Arctic Ocean.

=== Season 12 ===
Season 12 is filmed in the Karoo semidesert of South Africa.

== Series overview ==
Season	Subtitle	Location	Episodes	Originally released		Days Lasted	Winner(s)	Runner(s)-up
Season	Subtitle	Location	Episodes	First released	Last released	Days Lasted	Winner(s)	Runner(s)-up
1	—N/a	Quatsino, British Columbia	11	June 18, 2015	August 20, 2015	56	Alan Kay	Sam Larson
2	—N/a	Quatsino, British Columbia	15	April 21, 2016	July 14, 2016	66	David McIntyre	Larry Roberts
3	—N/a	Patagonia, Argentina	12	December 8, 2016	February 9, 2017	87	Zachary Fowler	Carleigh Fairchild
4	Lost & Found	Quatsino, British Columbia	12	June 15, 2017	August 17, 2017	75	Jim and Ted Baird	Pete and Sam Brockdorff
5	Redemption	Selenge Province, Mongolia	12	June 14, 2018	August 16, 2018	60	Sam Larson	Britt Ahart
6	The Arctic	Great Slave Lake, Northwest Territories	11	June 6, 2019	August 22, 2019	77	Jordan Jonas	Woniya Thibeault
7	Million Dollar Challenge	Great Slave Lake, Northwest Territories	11	June 11, 2020	August 20, 2020	100	Roland Welker	Callie Russell
8	Grizzly Mountain	Chilko Lake, British Columbia	11	June 3, 2021	August 19, 2021	74	Clay Hayes	Biko Wright
9	Polar Bear Island	Nunatsiavut, Labrador	11	May 26, 2022	August 4, 2022	78	Juan Pablo Quiñonez	Karie Lee Knoke
10	Predator Lake	Reindeer Lake, Saskatchewan	11	June 8, 2023	August 17, 2023	66	Alan Tenta	James "Wyatt" Black
11	Arctic Circle	Inuvik, Northwest Territories	12	June 13, 2024	August 29, 2024	84	William Larkham Jr.	Timber Cleghorn
12	Africa	Great Karoo, South Africa	10	June 12, 2025	August 21, 2025	34	Nathan Olsen	Kelsey Loper
13	World Championship	Richardson Mountains, Northwest Territories	13	June 17, 2026	September 9, 2026	90	Žiga Ogorelec	Aaron Barnard
Specials	—N/a	—N/a	15	April 14, 2016	June 24, 2026	—N/a	—N/a	—N/a

== Reception ==
The series received positive reviews in its first season and outstanding reviews for its third season, and earned 2.5 million total viewers, placing it in the top three new nonfictional cable series of 2015.

== Spin-offs ==
The first spin-off series of Alone is called Alone: The Beast, which premiered on January 30, 2020 and is broken up into 6 episodes. In this series, three people (per episode) attempt to survive in the wild for 30 days, with no tools or supplies except for their own clothing and a freshly killed animal. The first three episodes take place somewhere in the North American Arctic Circle, and each trio is provided either a 1,000-pound bull moose or musk ox. The last three episodes take place in the swamps of Louisiana, where they are given an alligator and wild boar, respectively. There are no prizes given for the winners other than honor/bragging rights.

In 2022, two new spin-off series were ordered. Alone: Frozen drops six former contestants on Labrador's east coast in the dead of winter, where they must survive for a set 50 days. The person or people who lasted that long split a cash prize of $500,000 (USD). Alone: The Skills Challenge, brings back three former contestants who put their bushcraft skills to the test in head-to-head building competitions. Contestants are provided basic tools and can only use the natural resources around them. Both shows aired at the beginning of August after Season 9.

== International versions ==
Legend:

Currently airing franchise
Franchise with an upcoming season
Franchise no longer aired
Status unknown

Country/Region	Local title English title	Network(s)	Winners
Australia	Alone Australia	SBS	Season 1, 2023: Gina Chick; Season 2, 2024: Krzysztof Wojtkowsk; Season 3, 2025: Shay Williamson; Season 4, 2026: Trent Fenton
Belgium	Alone	Streamz/Play4	Season 1, 2025: Suzan de Wilde
Denmark	Alene i vildmarken Alone Denmark	DR3 (Season 1); DR1 (Seasons 2-present)	Season 1, 2017: Jon Lindberg; Season 2, 2018: Lars Nyhuus Henriksen; Season 3, 2019: Flemming "Falkemanden" Sanggaard; Season 4, 2020: Kim "Fjeldgængeren" Krohn; Season 5, 2021: Emil Fammé Hansen & Nicklas Flenø Mikaelsen; Season 6, 2022: Ulla Thomsen; Season 7, 2023: Christian Hjort; Season 8, 2024: Claus Ballisager & Ulrik Ørskov; Season 9, 2025: Bente Hørby Boisen; Season 10, 2026: Rasmus Kragh
Finland	Alone Suomi – yksin erämaassa Alone Finland – Alone in the Wilderness	MTV3	Season 1, 2025: Esa Karpoff; Season 2, 2026: Upcoming season
Germany	Alone - Überlebe die Wildnis; Alone - Survive the Wilderness	RTL+	Season 1, 2024: David Leichtle
Netherlands	Alone	RTL Nederland	Season 1, 2024: Daan Timmers
Norway	Alene; Alone	TV 2	Season 1, 2017: Jens Kristian Kvernmo
Sweden	Ensam i vildmarken Alone in the Wilderness	Kanal 5 Discovery+	Season 1, 2021: Daniel Blomé
United Kingdom	Alone UK	Channel 4	Series 1, 2023: Tom Williams

== See also ==
- Survivorman
- Wilderness survival
