= Alone: The Skills Challenge =

Spin-off of the American survival TV show Alone

- Genre: Reality; Survival
- Country of origin: United States
- Original language: English
- No. of seasons: 1
- No. of episodes: 12

Production
- Production companies: Leftfield Pictures

Original release
- Network: History
- Release: August 5 – October 20, 2022

Related
- Alone (TV series)

Alone: The Skills Challenge is as spin-off season of Alone.

== Format ==
On each episode, three competitors from a previous season of Alone (USA) are issued a challenge by a fourth prior competitor and are given 3 days to complete the challenge prior to judgement on the fourth day. The fourth competitor sets the overall challenge, sets three criteria for judgement, selects the tools to be provided and selects the winner at the end. Each of the three are provided with an identical set of tools they may use in completing the challenge in addition to the natural resources available to them plus anything they have with them. Each of the three competitors compete in their home location and self document their progress. There is no prize for winning a challenge.

== Episodes ==
No. in season	Title	Original release date	U.S. viewers (millions)
1	"Earth Shelter"	August 4, 2022	N/A
Challenge: Build an earth shelter Criteria: Fit one person; Have a working fireplace; 10 °F (5.6 °C) warmer inside; Tools: axe, shovel, saw, plastic tarp
2	"Bushcraft Bridge"	August 11, 2022	N/A
Challenge: Build a bridge Criteria: Be at least 12 feet (3.7 m) in length; Use natural materials as cordage; Be sturdy enough to cross five times; Tools: saw, manila rope, auger, parang
3	"Smoke-Free, Bone-Dry Shelter"	August 11, 2022	N/A
Challenge: Build a bone-dry, smoke-free shelter Criteria: Fit one person; Stay dry in the rain; Remain smoke-free inside when a fire is lit; Tools: multi-tool, paracord, saw blade
4	"Wilderness Oven"	August 18, 2022	N/A
Challenge: Build a wilderness oven Criteria: Fit a cast-iron skillet; Be hot enough to bake bread; Be fire-safe (not burn down during use); Tools: machete, saw, canvas tarp
5	"Wilderness Watercraft"	August 25, 2022	N/A
Challenge: Build a wilderness watercraft Criteria: Float; Not leak; Travel 100 feet (30 m) in water; Tools: saw, knife, bankline, plastic tarp
6	"Elevated Shelter with Food Storage"	September 1, 2022	N/A
Challenge: Build an elevated shelter with a food storage area Criteria: Be at least 12 feet (3.7 m) tall; Support competitor weight for one night; Have an animal-safe food storage area; Tools: knife, saw, paracord, canvas tarp
7	"Supersized Deadfall Trap"	September 8, 2022	N/A
Challenge: Build a large deadfall trap Criteria: Heavy enough to kill a 25–30 pounds (11–14 kg) animal; Big enough to fit a watermelon; Able to crack the rind of the watermelon; Tools: kukri, bankline, animal bones
8	"Fishing Kit & Smoker"	September 29, 2022	N/A
Challenge: Build a fishing kit and a fish smoker Criteria: Catch one fish 6 inches (15 cm) or longer; Smoke the fish; Eat the fish; Tools: paracord, antler tines, pocket-knife, axe head
9	"Floating Shelter"	September 29, 2022	N/A
Challenge: Build a raft with a shelter Criteria: Include a shelter large enough for one person; Spend a night on-board; Stay afloat for at least one night; Tools: parang, saw, paracord
10	"Nature-Powered Rotisserie"	October 6, 2022	N/A
Challenge: Build a nature-powered rotisserie Criteria: Create a nature-powered rotisserie; Start a friction fire; Fully cooked chicken; Tools: multi-tool, hemp twine
11	"Large Game Projectiles"	October 13, 2022	N/A
Challenge: Build two large game projectiles Criteria: Travel at least 20 feet (6.1 m) thought the air; Hit a 12 inches (30 cm) target; Penetrate 6 inches (15 cm) deep into the target; Tools: ferro rod, artificial sinew, sami knife
12	"Pocket Survival"	October 20, 2022	N/A
Challenge: With no tools other than what is in your pockets, you must survive 48 hours in the wild Criteria: Build a shelter to keep warm and dry for two nights; Start or maintain at least one fire to stay warm; Purify and drink at least 2 US quarts (1.9 L) of water; Forage and consume at least 500 calories (2,100 kJ) of food; Tools: None provided

== Results ==
Name	Episode											
Name	1	2	3	4	5	6	7	8	9	10	11	12
Britt Ahart		Lost	Judge	Judge	Lost		Lost	Lost	Lost			
Callie North	Judge	Won		Won	Lost				Won	Won	Lost	Judge
Lucas Miller	Won	Lost			Judge		Lost				Won	Lost
Joel Van Der Loon						Lost		Won	Lost	Lost	Judge	Won
Clay Hayes			Lost	Lost	Won	Lost	Judge	Lost		Judge		Lost
Amos Rodriguez	Lost	Judge	Lost	Lost		Judge				Lost	Lost	
Jordan Jonas	Lost		Won			Won	Won	Judge	Judge			
