= Alone season 12 =

Alone
- Season 12
- No. of contestants: 10
- Winner: Nathan Olsen
- Runner-up: Kelsey Loper

Release
- Original network: History
- Original release: June 12 – August 21, 2025

Season chronology
- ← Previous; Season 11 Next → Season 13

The twelfth season of Alone, a.k.a. Alone: Africa, premiered on June 12, 2025. It is set in Great Karoo, a large semi-arid region in South Africa.

== Location ==
Great Karoo, South Africa.

== Episodes ==
No. overall	No. in season	Title	Original release date	U.S. viewers (millions)
124	1	"The Land of Great Thirst"	June 12, 2025	0.501
"I see my path, but I don't know where it leads. Not knowing where I'm going is what inspires me to travel it." - Rosalia de Castro
125	2	"Best Laid Plans"	June 19, 2025	0.467
"Things are not always as they seem; the first appearance deceives many." - Phaedrus
126	3	"Thirst Trap"	June 26, 2025	0.478
"We never know the worth of water till the well is dry." - Thomas Fuller
127	4	"Finding a Foothold"	July 11, 2025	0.502
"Life can only be understood backwards, but it must be lived forwards." - Søren Kierkegaard
128	5	"The Tempest"	July 18, 2025	0.440
"When you come out of the storm, you won't be the same person who walked in." - Haruki Murakami
129	6	"Purpose"	July 25, 2025	0.461
"The two most important days in your life are the day you are born and the day you find out why." - Mark Twain
130	7	"Echoes of Emptiness"	August 1, 2025	0.444
"The universe will reward you for taking risks on its behalf." - Shakti Gawain
131	8	"Weak Spot"	August 8, 2025	0.423
"What stands in the way becomes the way." - Marcus Aurelius
132	9	"The Promised Land"	August 14, 2025	0.517
"Our greatest glory is not in our falling, but in rising every time we fall" - Nelson Mandela
133	10	"No Regrats"	August 21, 2025	0.489
"It is never too late to be what you might have been" - Mary Ann Evans

== Results ==
Name	Age	Gender	Hometown	Country	Status	Reason they tapped out	Ref.
Nathan Olsen (Note: Brother of Alone season 10 contestant Luke Olsen)	52	Male	Buhl, ID	USA	34 days	Winner	
Kelsey Loper	35	Female	Winnett, MT	USA	33 days	Lack of food, did not want to be medically evacuated	
Katie Rydge	46	Female	Emerald Beach, NSW	Australia	28 days	Realised she needed to learn to let go	
Baha Mahmutov	50	Male	Wharncliff, Ontario	Canada	19 days	Struggled to keep fire going (did not bring ferro rod) and lack of food	
Dug North	53	Male	Nashua, NH	USA	14 days	Concerned about his health after fainting	
Douglas S. Meyer	57	Male	Kannapolis, NC	USA	14 days	Struggled with wet weather, worried about father's cancer (Note: He does not make it back home in time to see his father before his death, this episode ends with the text "In memory of Ronald Charles Meyer, Sr. March 30, 1943 - May 23, 2024".)	
Will Lamb	31	Male	Leakey, TX	USA	5 days (medically evacuated)	Acute colitis, bloody vomit	
Pablo Arguelles	55	Male	Jacksonville, FL	USA	5 days	Struggled to stay hydrated	
Colton Gilman	35	Male	Red Lodge, MT	USA	4 days	Depression due to lack of distractions	
Jit Patel	35	Male	Anakiwa	New Zealand	4 days	Diarrhea and vomiting	
