= Alone season 13 =

Alone
- Season 13
- Location of the 13th season
- No. of contestants: 10
- Winner: Žiga Ogorelec
- Runner-up: Aaron Barnard
- No. of episodes: 13

Release
- Original network: History
- Original release: June 17 – September 9, 2026

Season chronology
- ← Previous; Season 12

The thirteenth season of Alone, a.k.a. Alone: World Championship, premiered on June 17, 2026. It is set within the Arctic Circle in the Beaufort Delta along the rugged Richardson Mountains in the Canadian Northwest Territories of Aklavik, about 150km from where they filmed Alone season 11. This season, survivalists from seven different countries are represented including Canada, Australia, Wales, The United States, Slovenia, Portugal, and New Zealand.

== Location ==
Beaufort Delta (Inuvik Region), adjacent to Richardson Mountains approximately 125 mi (201 km) north of the Arctic Circle in the Northwest Territories, Aklavik Canada parallel to the border with Yukon Territory. Drop Off (Day 1) was on September 8, 2025.

== Episodes ==
No. overall	No. in season	Title	Original release date	U.S. viewers (millions)
134	1	"Worlds Collide: Part 1"	June 17, 2026	0.388
"Bravado may stir the crowd, but courage needs no audience." — T.F. Hodge
135	2	"Worlds Collide: Part 2"	June 24, 2026	0.413
"Notice that the stiffest tree is most easily cracked, while the bamboo or willow survives by bending with the wind." — Bruce Lee
136	3	"Building Momentum"	July 1, 2026	0.421
"I find that opportunities actually present themselves in unexpected ways, and that's what I want to be open to." — PJ Hirabayashi
137	4	"Cold Omen"	July 8, 2026	N/A
"He who rejects change is the architect of decay." — Harold Wilson
138	5	"Thin Margins"	July 15, 2026	N/A
"I am life that wants to live, in the midst of life that wants to live." — Albert Schweitzer
139	6	"Balancing Act"	July 22, 2026	N/A
"Start where you are. Use what you have. Do what you can." — Arthur Ashe
140	7	"Natural Order"	July 29, 2026	N/A
"The tree which moves some to tears of joy is in the eyes of others only a green thing that stands in the way." — William Blake
141	8	"Tides of Fortune"	August 5, 2026	N/A
"Change your leaves, keep intact your roots." — Victor Hugo
142	9	"Icebound"	August 12, 2026	N/A
"When you realize there is nothing lacking, the whole world belongs to you." — Lao Tzu
143	10	"No Safe Haven"	August 19, 2026	N/A
"We must learn to suffer what we cannot evade." — Michel de Montaigne
144	11	"Fire and Famine"	August 26, 2026	N/A
"No man ever stops in the same river twice, for it's not the same river and he's not the same man." — Heraclitus
145	12	"Subzero"	September 2, 2026	N/A
"Truth is confirmed by inspection and delay; falsehood by haste and uncertainty." — Tacitus
146	13	"Worlds Apart"	September 9, 2026	TBD
"What is to give light must endure burning." — Viktor Frankl

== Results ==
Cast and results for this season.

Name	Age	Gender	Hometown	Country	Status	Reason they tapped out
Žiga Ogorelec	35	Male	Kočevje	Slovenia	90 days	Winner
Aaron Barnard	40	Male	Prince George, British Columbia	Canada	87 days	Mental and physical exhaustion
Nero Buys	40	Male	New South Wales	Australia	85 days	Achieved his goals, left on his own terms to see family
Andrew Price	51	Male	Gower Peninsula, Wales	United Kingdom	71 days	Effects of starvation
Jacks Genega	40	Female	New York	United States	62 days	Eye irritation from the smoke/steam
Will Longley	37	Male	Kotzebue, Alaska	United States	30 days	Fecal Impaction
Clementino Pedrosa	41	Male	Lisbon	Portugal	21 days (medically evacuated)	Heart rate (34 bpm) too low
Poldi Waldmann-Moloney	24	Male	Hokitika	New Zealand	14 days	Emotional breakdown
Dave Booth	54	Male	Palmer, Alaska	United States	4 days	Burned up ferro rod in fire
David Young	31	Male	Washington	United States	3 days	Missed family
