= Alone Denmark =

Danish survival reality television series

- Danish: Alene i vildmarken
- Genre: Reality; Survival
- Based on: Alone
- Country of origin: Denmark
- Original language: Danish
- No. of seasons: 10
- No. of episodes: 68 (+7?)

Original release
- Network: DR1
- Release: 1 January 2017 – present

Alone Denmark (transl. "Alene i vildmarken") is a television program that premiered on 1 January 2017 on DR3. It is the Danish version of the North American television show Alone.

== Format ==
A group of contestants are sent out into the wilderness in total isolation and with minimum survival equipment. They must film their experience themselves as they struggle with hunger, cold, isolation, the harsh environment and their own mental struggle. Each participant is given an emergency GPS transmitter and a satellite phone that they can use to withdraw from the competition or to call for help at any time.

Before the competition begins, participants must pass medical and psychological checks as well as basic bushcraft trials (eg. shelter building, fire making).

Unlike the North American version, there is no prize money for the winner in the Danish version.

When the show returned in 2021 for a fifth season, the series switched from individual participants to pairs.

Pairs have been participating in several seasons since 2021. In the show for 2026, pairs competed along single participants. The pair teams had to live 10 days separated before joining up.

== Episodes and results ==
Series	Location	Episodes	Originally released		Days Lasted	Winner	Runner-up
Series	Location	Episodes	First released	Last released	Days Lasted	Winner	Runner-up
1	Altevatnet, Norway	10	1 January 2017	26 February 2017	45	Jon Lindberg	Christian Hjort
2	Altevatnet, Norway	8	29 December 2019	22 February 2018	27	Lars Nyhuus Henriksen	Sanne Flade Larsen; Astrid Hadberg
3	Salvatnet, Norway	8	24 January 2019	14 March 2019	60	Flemming "The Falconer" Sanggaard	Mette Mortensen
4	Altevatnet, Norway	7	27 February 2020	9 April 2020	60	Kim "The Mountaineer" Krohn	Alfred Hannibal Høgsbro-Nielsen
5	Altevatnet, Norway	7	March 18, 2021	April 29, 2021	32	Emil Fammé Hansen; Nicklas Flenø Mikaelsen	Ann Pedersen; Bjørn G. Nielsen
6	Altevatnet, Norway	7	March 17, 2022	April 28, 2022	30	Ulla Thomsen	Aslak Skjøth; Rikke Dypping
7	Salvatnet, Norway	7	March 16, 2023	May 4, 2023	42	Christian Hjort	Rasmus Christiansen
8	Lapland, Finland	7	March 7, 2024	April 18, 2024	49	Claus Ballisager; Ulrik Ørskov	Anne Kjær Lindegaard
9	Lapland, Finland	7	May 1, 2025	June 19, 2025	33	Bente Hørby Boisen	Kristian Jersing
10	Lapland, Finland	7 (?)	July 11, 2026	TBA	63	Rasmus	Stefanie

=== Season 1 (2017) ===
Season 1 Results
Name	Age	Residence	Status
Jon Lindberg	36	Saltum	Day 45 (winner)
Christian Hjort	32	Herning	Day 44
Allan Pedersen	37	Kolding	Day 22
Rune Malte Bertram-Nielsen	23	Faaborg	Day 20
Emil Sanderhoff	28	Faaborg	Day 17
Ann-Mai Hansen	33	Fejø	Day 11
Stine Stjernholm	27	Hjørring	Day 11
Levi Daniel Petersen	31	Ærø	Day 9 (pulled)
Magnus Kramer	24	Hillerød	Day 7
Lasse Snede Froberg	26	Østerbro	Day 5

=== Season 2 (2018) ===
Season 2 Results
Name	Age	Residence	Status
Lars Nyhuus Henriksen	37	Vrads	Day 27 (winner)
Sanne Flade Larsen	51	Sorø	Day 25
Astrid Hadberg	28	Odense	Day 25
Geo Uldbjerg	34	Skødstrup	Day 21
Eddie Bach	47	Tappernøje	Day 16
Rasmus Rank	24	Hjallerup	Day 13
Jette	54	Hella, Iceland	Day 10
Birk Denslow Engemann	51	Storvorde	Day 5 (injury)

=== Season 3 (2019) ===
Season 3 Results
Name	Age	Residence	Status
Flemming "Falkemanden" Sanggaard	45	Them	Day 60 (winner)
Mette Mortensen	43	Kulhuse	Day 58
Mads Ravn	27	Hovedgård	Day 55
Henrik Pilgaard	52	Helsinge	Day 33
Rasmus Christiansen	39	Esbjerg	Day 31
Henrik Dreyer	39	Dybbøl	Day 27
Sune Hansen	41	Frørup	Day 15
Trine	32	Rønne	Day 7

=== Season 4 (2020) ===
Season 4 Results
Name	Age	Residence	Status
Kim "Fjeldgængeren" Krohn	45	Kolding	Day 60 (winner)
Alfred Hannibal Høgsbro-Nielsen	21	Brønshøj	Day 58
Jesper Westmark	49	Copenhagen	Day 29
Torben Falk Grove Wollesen	42	Rømø	Day 17
Emma Sund	21	Hornslet	Day 15
Miguel Santos Hussmann-Sørensen	30	Ans	Day 13
Ida Holst	23	Aalborg	Day 8
Stina Leuring	42	Søborg	Day 8

=== Season 5 (2021) ===
Season 5 Results
Name	Age	Residence	Relationship	Status
Emil Fammé Hansen	23	Fredericia	Friends	Day 32 (winners)
Nicklas Flenø Mikaelsen	23	Fredericia	Friends	Day 32 (winners)
Ann Pedersen	23	Vejle	Partners	Day 30
Bjørn G. Nielsen	28	Vejle	Partners	Day 30
Camilla Varming Nielsen	31	Krarup	Married	Day 29
Martha Marie Jensen	31	Krarup	Married	Day 29
Patrick D. Bates	31	Amager	Married	Day 24
Danielle Gregory	28	Amager	Married	Day 24
Caspar Møller Sørensen	25	Værløse	Friends	Day 16
Victor Gjedde	26	Værløse	Friends	Day 16
Carl C. Jørgensen	62	Ribe	Father and son	Day 5 (Mark injury)
Mark F. Nielsen	21	Ribe	Father and son	Day 5 (Mark injury)

=== Season 6 (2022) ===
Season 6 Results
Name	Age	Residence	Relationship	Status
Ulla Thomsen	60	Hvidovre	Solo	Day 30 (winner)
Aslak Skjøth	59	Brørup	Father and daughter	Day 29 (Aslak injury)
Rikke Dypping	32	Brørup	Father and daughter	Day 29 (Aslak injury)
Ester Kleist Kavigak Elmlund	25	Odense	Friends	Day 21 (Ester injury)
Anna-Caroline Bonde Fosmark	22	Engesvang	Friends	Day 21 (Ester injury)
Katja Normand	34	Brøndby Strand	Friends	Day 18
Katrine Sommer Berg	31	Ås, Norway	Friends	Day 18
Steen Jensen-Petersen	40	Rødekro	Married	Day 5
Rosa Jensen-Petersen	38	Rødekro	Married	Day 5
Simon Nyhave Bruun	26	Køge	Solo	Day 5
Carl C. Jørgensen	63	Ribe	Solo	Day 2 (injury)

=== Season 7 (2023) ===
Season 7 Results
Name	Age	Residence	Original Season	Status
Christian Hjort	38	Egtved	2017	Day 42 (winner)
Rasmus Christiansen	43	Esbjerg	2019	Day 40
Camilla Varming Nielsen	35	Krarup	2021	Day 36
Sanne Flade Larsen	57	Sorø	2018	Day 25
Jesper Westmark	52	Copenhagen	2020	Day 18
Anna-Caroline Bonde Fosmark	24	Silkeborg	2022	Day 15 (pulled)
Birk Denslow Engemann	56	Brønderslev	2018	Day 5
Victor Gjedde	28	Værløse	2021	Day 3

=== Season 8 (2024) ===
Season 8 Results
Name	Age	Gender	Residence	Status
Claus Ballisager	50	Male	Ørestad	Day 49 (winners)
Ulrik Ørskov	32	Male	Ellinge	Day 49 (winners)
Anne Kjær Lindegaard	33	Female	Amager	Day 44
Mette Rosgaard	54	Female	Søborg	Day 22
Søren Ravn	41	Male	Borup	Day 18 (pulled)
Bettina Jørgensen	38	Female	Vejle	Day 12
Anders Bruun	34	Male	Hårlev	Day 9

=== Season 9 (2025) ===
Season 9 Results
Name	Age	Residence	Status
Bente Hørby Boisen	49	Viborg	Day 33 (winner)
Kristian Jersing	44	Gilleleje	Day 31 (accident)
Jakob Cardi Von Lillienskjold	27	Vanløse	Day 30
Charlotte Karrebæk	50	Espergærde	Day 19
Christian Askholm	44	Sisimiut, Greenland	Day 13
John Kahn	45	Nørrebro	Day 9
Zenia Maltha	30	Tindbæk	Day 9 (injury)

=== Season 10 (2026) ===
Season 10 Results
Name	Age	Residence	Relationship	Status
Rasmus Kiilerich Kragh	36	Ebeltoft	Solo	Day 63 (winner)
Stefanie Lea Paulsen	40	Rønnede	Solo	Day 62
Niels Ulrik Drescher	26	Aarhus	Solo	Day 40
Dea Larsen	46	Sønderborg	Solo	
Heidi Nissen	51	Valby	Solo	
Alexander Møller	32	Rødkærsbro	Friends	Day 6
Lasse Vig	34	Rødkærsbro	Friends	Day 6
Zein Al-khafaji	31	Silkeborg	Friends	Day 1 (Martin's Injury)
Martin Vindfeldt	38	Greve Strand	Friends	Day 1 (Martin's Injury)
