= Quatsino =

- Location of Quatsino in British Columbia Quatsino (British Columbia)
- Coordinates: 50°32′01″N 127°36′40″W
- Country: Canada
- Province: British Columbia

Area
  - Land: 8.37 km^{2} (3.23 sq mi)

Population (2016)
  - Total: 43
  - Density: 5.1/km^{2} (13/sq mi)
- Time zone: UTC−07:00 (PT)

Quatsino is a small hamlet of 91 people located on Quatsino Sound in Northern Vancouver Island, Canada only accessible by boat or float plane. Its nearest neighbour is Coal Harbour, to the east, about 20 minutes away by boat, and Port Alice, to the south, about 40 minutes away by boat. The largest town in the region, Port Hardy, is located about an hour northeast by boat and motor vehicle.

== Description ==
The village is known to have one of British Columbia's few public one-room schoolhouses still in use, a two-story wooden building built in 1935. The oldest building on the North Island is also located in Quatsino, a woodland chapel called St. Olaf's Anglican Church, a popular site for weddings. It was built in 1897. Quatsino was originally settled by Norwegian farmers from North Dakota who arrived via steamship in 1894 to homestead and farm thirty 80-acre (320,000 m^{2}) lots offered free through Crown Grants- publicized at the Chicago World Exposition of 1893. Soon freight service to Victoria was established, along with a post office and customs office and a government wharf. The area grew as resources were developed and the area boasted numerous mines, canneries, general stores, rental cabins, a hotel, a saloon, telegraph office and an Imperial Oil fuel station. The village was a thriving community up until the 1940s. The post office is still in operation and two cemeteries mark the history of the community. Located approximately 1 mi (1.6 km) north of the community is Colony Lake, a favorite swimming spot and a popular destination for canoeing and lake trout fishing.

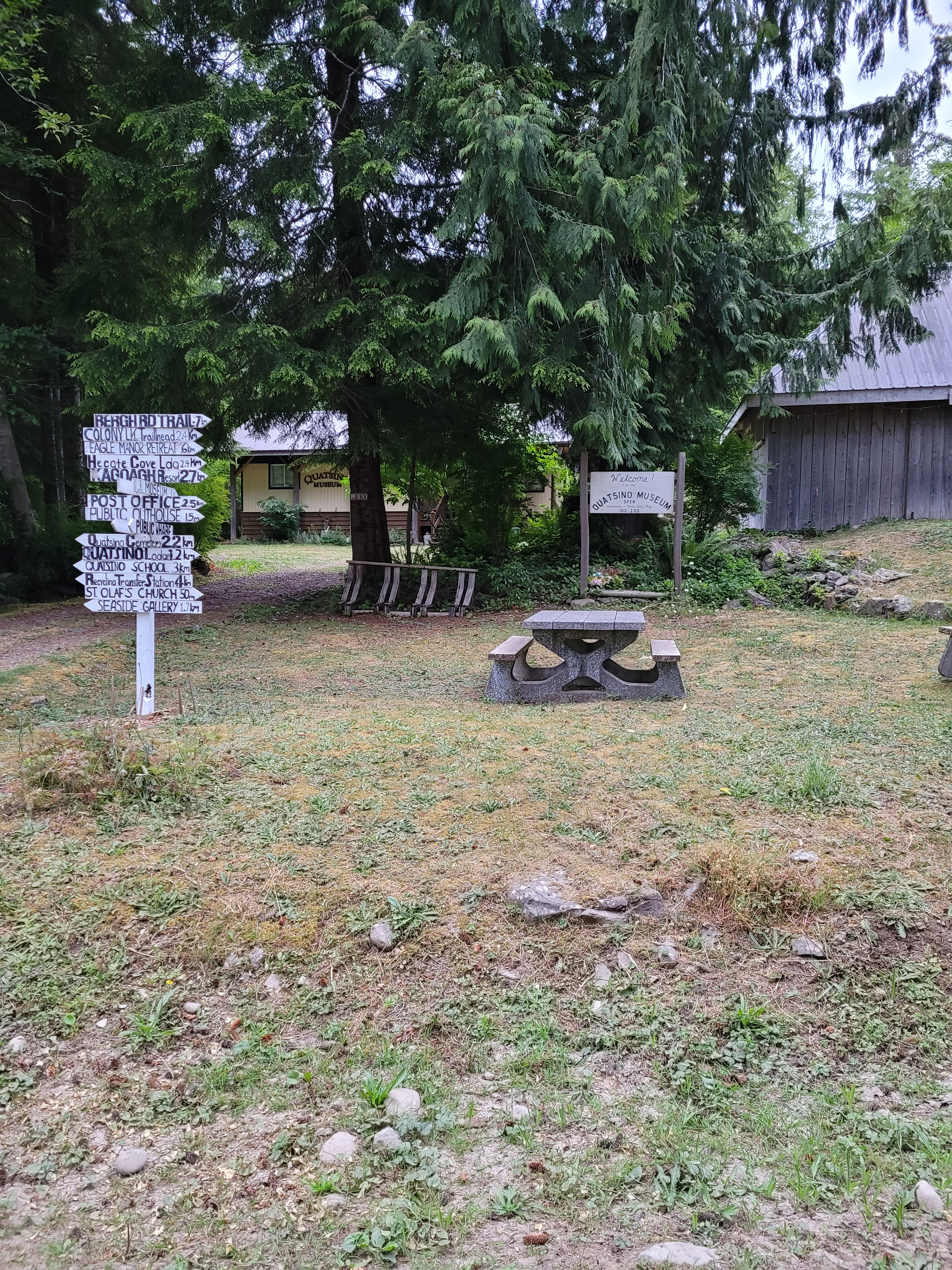
Quatsino town directions sign post

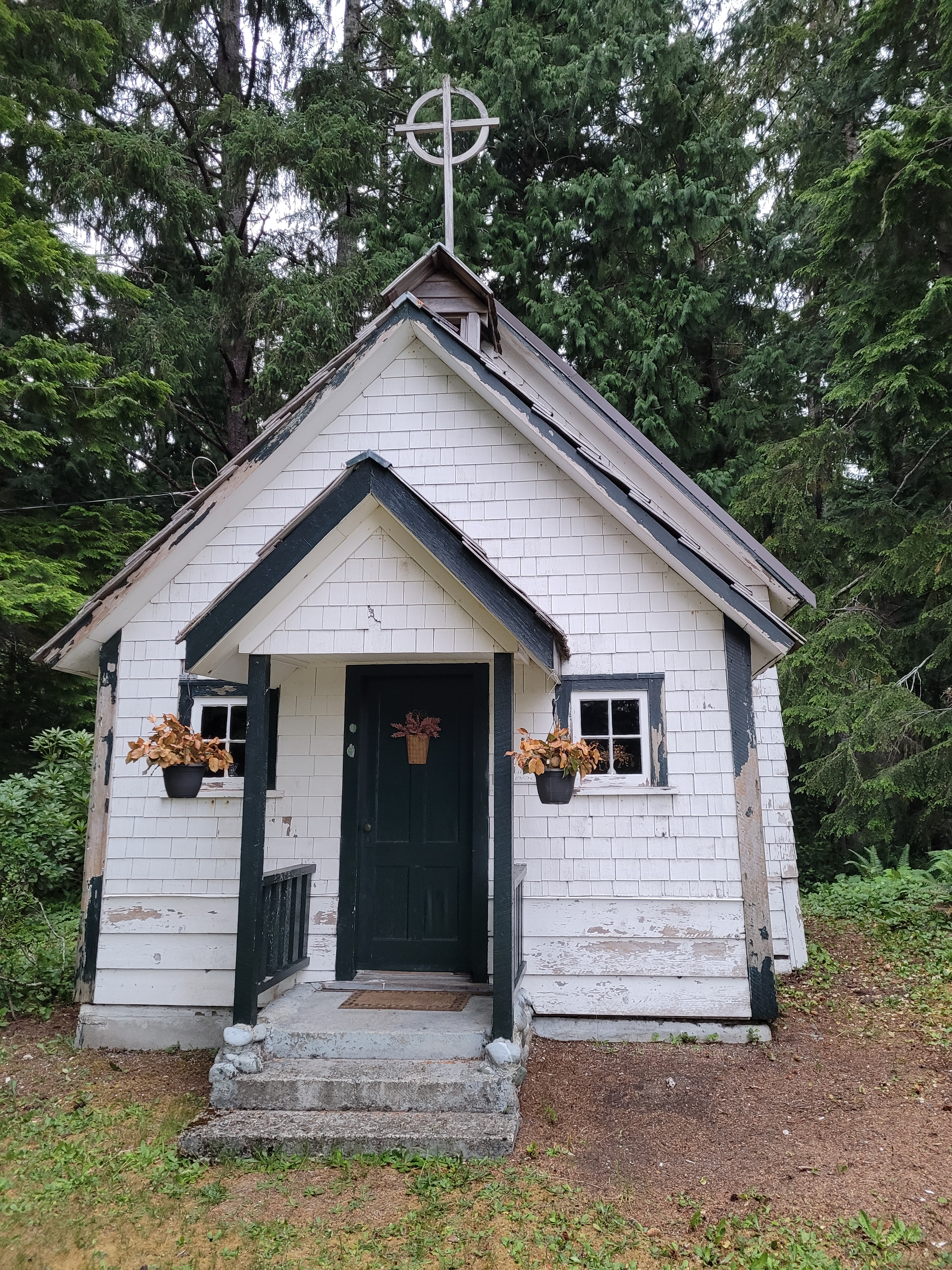
St Olaf Anglican Church Quatsino - Vancouver Island

High-speed Internet via satellite arrived in the mid-spring of 2007, replacing slow speed dial up in most of the community. The new destination for visitors to the area is the Quatsino Museum, which opened in the summer of 2007.

== Tourism ==
Since 2003, Quatsino has become an increasingly popular destination for sports fishing, kayaking, bird watching and whale watching. There are numerous sports fishing lodges that have opened as a result.

== Featured in media ==
Alone, an American reality television series, was filmed on Vancouver Island in Quatsino Territory for its first, second and fourth seasons, shot between 2015-2017.

Caiette, a setting in the Emily St. John Mandel novels The Glass Hotel and Sea of Tranquility, is based on Quatsino.

== Climate ==
Quatsino has a rainy oceanic climate (Köppen Cfb) with cool and generally very rainy winters and mild, somewhat drier (though much wetter than Vancouver or eastern island communities) summers. Cold outbreaks that produce cold and dry winter weather over coastal communities are less effective over Vancouver Island.

Climate data for Quatsino
Month	Jan	Feb	Mar	Apr	May	Jun	Jul	Aug	Sep	Oct	Nov	Dec	Year
Record high °C (°F)	17.5 (63.5)	19 (66)	20.5 (68.9)	28.5 (83.3)	30 (86)	33 (91)	33.9 (93.0)	32.2 (90.0)	29.5 (85.1)	22.5 (72.5)	20.6 (69.1)	16.5 (61.7)	33.9 (93.0)
Mean daily maximum °C (°F)	6 (43)	7.6 (45.7)	9.7 (49.5)	12.2 (54.0)	15.1 (59.2)	17.1 (62.8)	19.7 (67.5)	20.1 (68.2)	18 (64)	12.9 (55.2)	8.2 (46.8)	6 (43)	12.7 (54.9)
Mean daily minimum °C (°F)	1.2 (34.2)	1.7 (35.1)	2.3 (36.1)	3.7 (38.7)	6.1 (43.0)	8.6 (47.5)	10.5 (50.9)	10.9 (51.6)	9.2 (48.6)	6.6 (43.9)	3.4 (38.1)	1.6 (34.9)	5.5 (41.9)
Record low °C (°F)	−16.7 (1.9)	−11.5 (11.3)	−10 (14)	−5.6 (21.9)	−2.8 (27.0)	−1.1 (30.0)	2.2 (36.0)	3.3 (37.9)	−0.6 (30.9)	−4.5 (23.9)	−12 (10)	−12.2 (10.0)	−16.7 (1.9)
Average precipitation mm (inches)	335.2 (13.20)	254.7 (10.03)	221.1 (8.70)	168.7 (6.64)	100.8 (3.97)	86.6 (3.41)	48.1 (1.89)	75.2 (2.96)	133.0 (5.24)	305.3 (12.02)	398.5 (15.69)	365.9 (14.41)	2,493.1 (98.16)
Average rainfall mm (inches)	321.0 (12.64)	243.9 (9.60)	213.2 (8.39)	167.8 (6.61)	100.8 (3.97)	86.6 (3.41)	48.1 (1.89)	75.2 (2.96)	133.0 (5.24)	305.1 (12.01)	394.7 (15.54)	355.1 (13.98)	2,444.5 (96.24)
Average snowfall cm (inches)	14.2 (5.6)	10.7 (4.2)	7.9 (3.1)	0.9 (0.4)	0.0 (0.0)	0.0 (0.0)	0.0 (0.0)	0.0 (0.0)	0.0 (0.0)	0.2 (0.1)	3.9 (1.5)	10.7 (4.2)	48.5 (19.1)
Average precipitation days (≥ 0.2 mm)	22.6	19.5	22.6	20.3	17.7	16.5	10.7	12.3	13.7	21.5	23.8	23.5	224.7
Average rainy days (≥ 0.2 mm)	21.4	19.1	22.3	20.3	17.7	16.5	10.7	12.3	13.7	21.4	23.6	22.7	221.7
Average snowy days (≥ 0.2 cm)	3.8	2.7	2.0	0.0	0.0	0.0	0.0	0.0	0.0	0.2	1.0	2.9	12.6
Source: Environment Canada
