= Alone season 2 =

Alone
- Season 2
- Location of Quatsino in British Columbia Location of the second season near Port Hardy, British Columbia.
- No. of contestants: 10
- Winner: David McIntyre
- Runner-up: Larry Roberts
- No. of episodes: 13

Release
- Original network: History
- Original release: April 21 – July 14, 2016

Season chronology
- ← Previous; Season 1 Next → Season 3

The second season of Alone began on April 21, 2016. The season had 15 one-hour episodes, including the reunion episode and the first "Episode 0", which shows how the 10 contestants (pared down from 20) were chosen based on survival skills (i.e. ability to make a fire without a starter, basic animal prep, shelter), on-camera personality, and how readily they learned the camera equipment. This was the first season to include women (only men competed season one).

== Episodes ==
No. overall	No. in season	Title	Original release date	U.S. viewers (millions)
12	1	"Once More Unto the Breach"	April 21, 2016	1.520
"The oldest and strongest emotion of mankind is fear, and the oldest and strongest kind of fear is fear of the unknown." – H. P. Lovecraft
13	2	"The Knife's Edge"	April 28, 2016	1.507
"The very basic core of a man's living spirit is his passion for adventure." – Christopher McCandless
14	3	"The Beasts of the Night"	May 5, 2016	1.637
"Use your fear... It can take you to a place where you store your courage." – Amelia Earhart
15	4	"Hunger's Grip"	May 12, 2016	1.579
"The instinct to survive will never change, neither will the human body's amazing ability to endure." – John 'Lofty' Wiseman
16	5	"Storm Rising"	May 19, 2016	1.751
"Strength does not come from physical capacity. It comes from an indomitable will." – Mahatma Gandhi
17	6	"Adrift"	May 26, 2016	1.718
"Voyaging through wildernesses is essential to the growth and maturity of the human spirit." – Steven Callahan
18	7	"Trial By Fire"	June 9, 2016	1.597
"In nature there are neither rewards nor punishments; there are consequences." – R.G. Ingersoll
19	8	"The Ascent"	June 16, 2016	1.678
"Why wilderness? Because we like the taste of freedom, because we like the smell of danger." – Edward Abbey
20	9	"The Madness"	June 23, 2016	1.609
"Look deep into nature, and then you will understand everything better." – Albert Einstein
21	10	"The Gamble"	June 30, 2016	1.698
"The world breaks everyone, and afterward, some are strong at the broken places." – Ernest Hemingway
22	11	"Winter's Fury"	July 7, 2016	1.615
"To live is to suffer, to survive is to find some meaning in the suffering." – Friedrich Nietzsche
23	12	"Into the Abyss"	July 14, 2016	1.598
"You're never more alive than when you're almost dead." – Tim O'Brien
24	13	"The End Game"	July 14, 2016	1.541
"Endurance is not just the ability to bear a hard thing, but to turn it into glory." – William Barclay

== Results ==
Name	Age	Gender	Hometown	Country	Status	Reason they tapped out	Ref.
David McIntyre	50	Male	Kentwood, Michigan	United States	Winner – 66 days	Victor	
Larry Roberts	44	Male	Rush City, Minnesota	United States	64 days	Hunger and mental breakdown	
Jose Martinez Amoedo	45	Male	Santa Pola, Valencia	Spain/Canada	59 days	Fell off kayak into river	
Nicole Apelian	45	Female	Portland, Oregon	United States	57 days	Missed her kids	
Justin Vititoe	35	Male	Augusta, Georgia	United States	35 days	Had nothing left to accomplish	
Randy Champagne	28	Male	Boulder, Utah	United States	21 days	Did not like being alone	
Mike Lowe	55	Male	Lewis, Colorado	United States	21 days	Missed his wife	
Tracy Wilson	44	Female	Aiken, South Carolina	United States	8 days	Bear scare	
Mary Kate Green	36	Female	Homer, Alaska	United States	7 days (medically evacuated)	Split tendon with axe	
Desmond White	37	Male	Coolidge, Arizona	United States	6 hours	Bear scare	
