= Coal Harbour (Vancouver Island) =

Village on Vancouver Island, British Columbia, Canada

Coordinates: 50°35′43″N 127°34′45″W

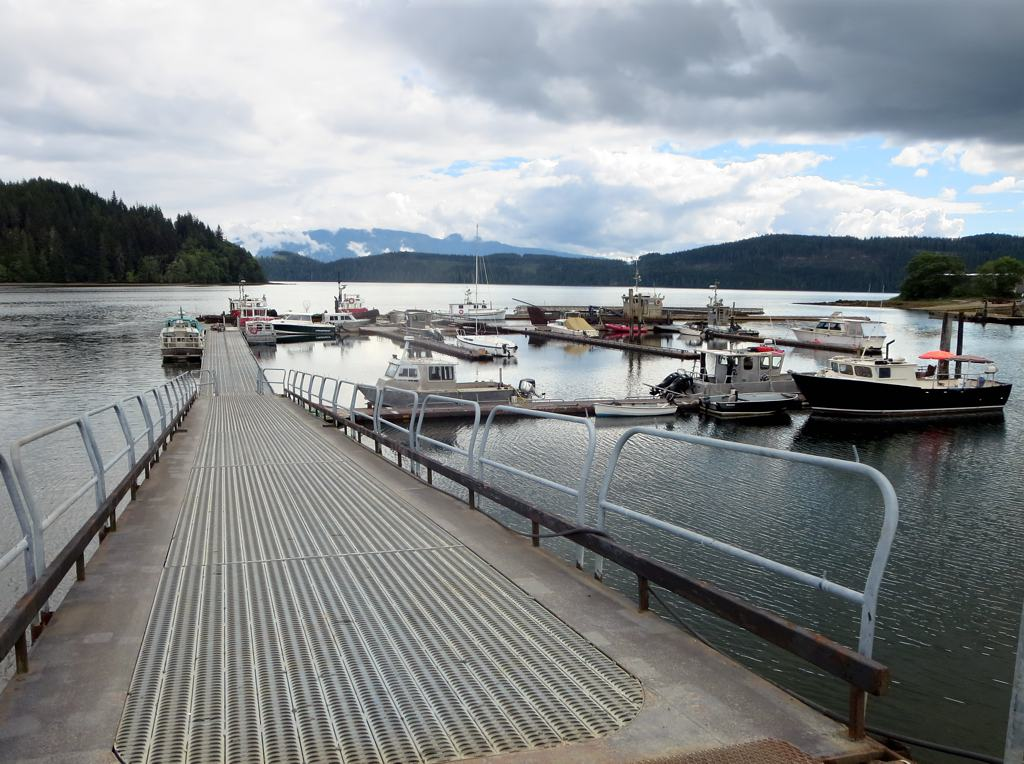
Coal Harbour

Coal Harbour is a harbour and community on northern Vancouver Island, British Columbia, Canada located on the north side of Holberg Inlet in the Quatsino Sound region. It is named after a small and unsuccessful local coal mine that was founded in 1883. The village's most successful industry, however, was whaling. It was the last whaling station in British Columbia when it closed in 1967. The station utilized the original buildings of the RCAF. In the early 1980's the main place of work was the shake and shingle mill, the pier was a small wooden wharf you had to drive onto to get fuel, there was no gas station, and the marina sold milk, bread, eggs, butter, pop, and cigarettes.

== RCAF Coal Harbour ==
The townsite and surrounding area was the site of a Royal Canadian Air Force base for seaplane patrols in the Northern Pacific during World War II. Many of the original buildings still remain, such as the general store (the old gymnasium), and the officers' barracks immediately overlooking the harbour. RCAF Stranraers and later Canso-As (the Canadian designation for Consolidated PBY Catalina flying boats built by Canadian Vickers) were based here. Anti-aircraft ordnance, ammunition storage for depth charges and considerable concrete fortifications were built. A Stranraer was lost with all its crew during the war in mysterious circumstances.

There is a small, free museum dedicated to the RCAF station, built and maintained by a private individual in the sole remaining Canso hangar.

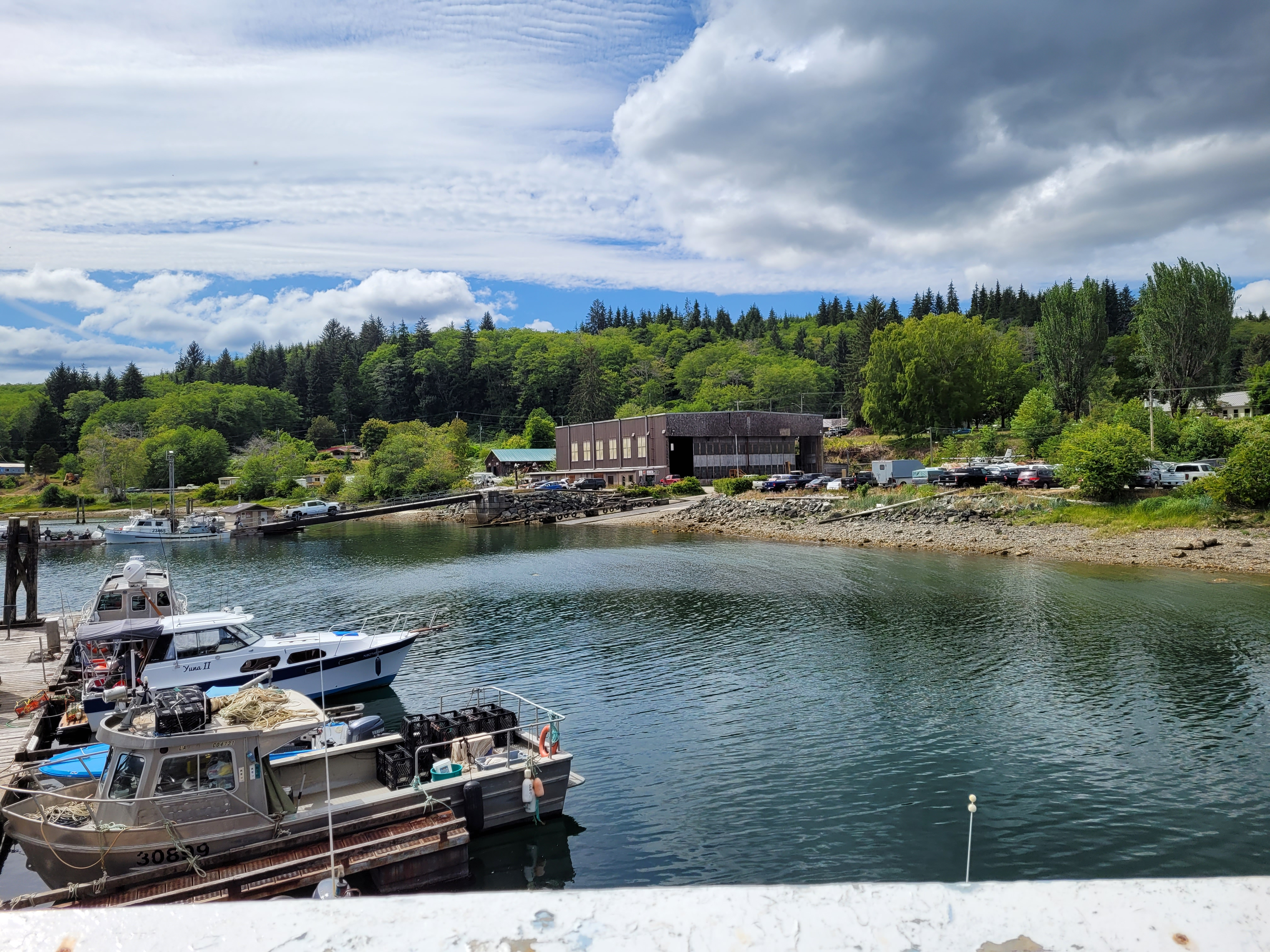
Coal harbor Aircraft hangar

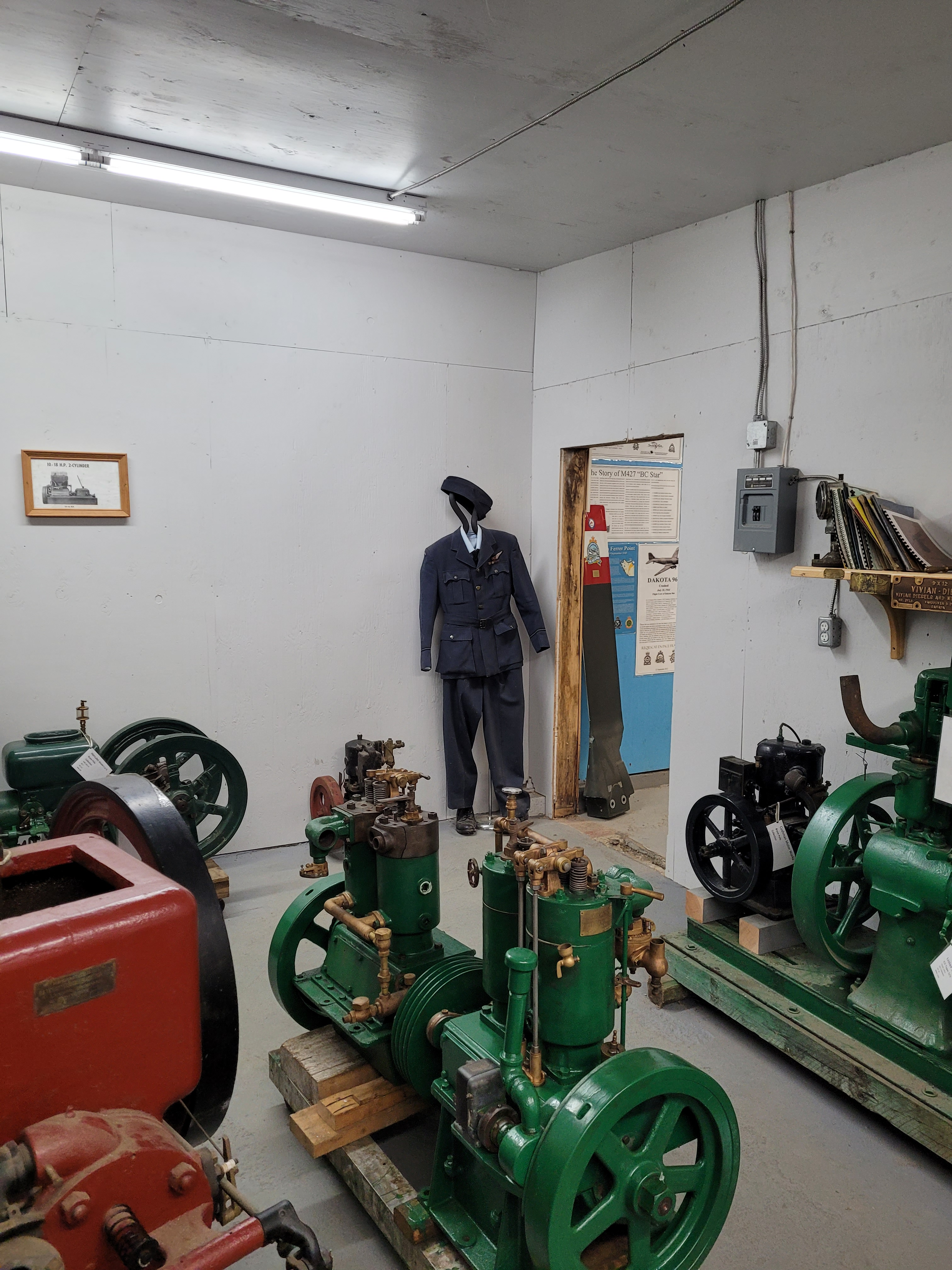
Coal Harbour museum items - old Generators and RCAF uniform

== Whaling station ==
After the war, the buildings were bought by B.C. Packers and whaling operations began. Whales were harpooned by a fleet of up to five small "chasers" with harpoon guns. Whales were brought up by steam windlass on the main slipway formerly used by planes and then flensed (stripped of their blubber) on the concourse and processed indoors. By-products included protein feed for animals, and fertilizer. The plant was powered by two World War II US destroyer steam engines.

Japanese whalers operated jointly with Canadian partners. The Taiyo group (now Maruha Nichiro) operated the Coal Harbour fisheries from 1962 to 1967. They caught mostly sei (2153), sperm (1108), and fin (837) whales. Some blue and humpback whales were also taken.

Canada Packers took over the facility when Taiyo pulled out in 1967, but it lay idle until they sold it for scrap. It was dismantled between 1972 and 1975 by Argus Salvage of Qualicum, British Columbia.

== Coal Harbour today ==
In the 1970s, a copper mine was established near the site and ran until 1996.

Today few of the original World War II buildings remain, the general store and the commanding officer's barracks still standing and being used as of 2010. The community is linked with a good paved road to Port Hardy. The local school has been closed and students commute to nearby Port Hardy. Coal Harbour is now a bedroom community for Port Hardy, but local industry remains in the form of seaplane services and connections to major fishing lodges. There is a general store and a local government wharf.

The village is also known for its gigantic jawbone of a blue whale. Nearby is the headquarters and main community of the Quatsino First Nation, the band government of the Gwat'sinux group of the Kwakwaka'wakw.

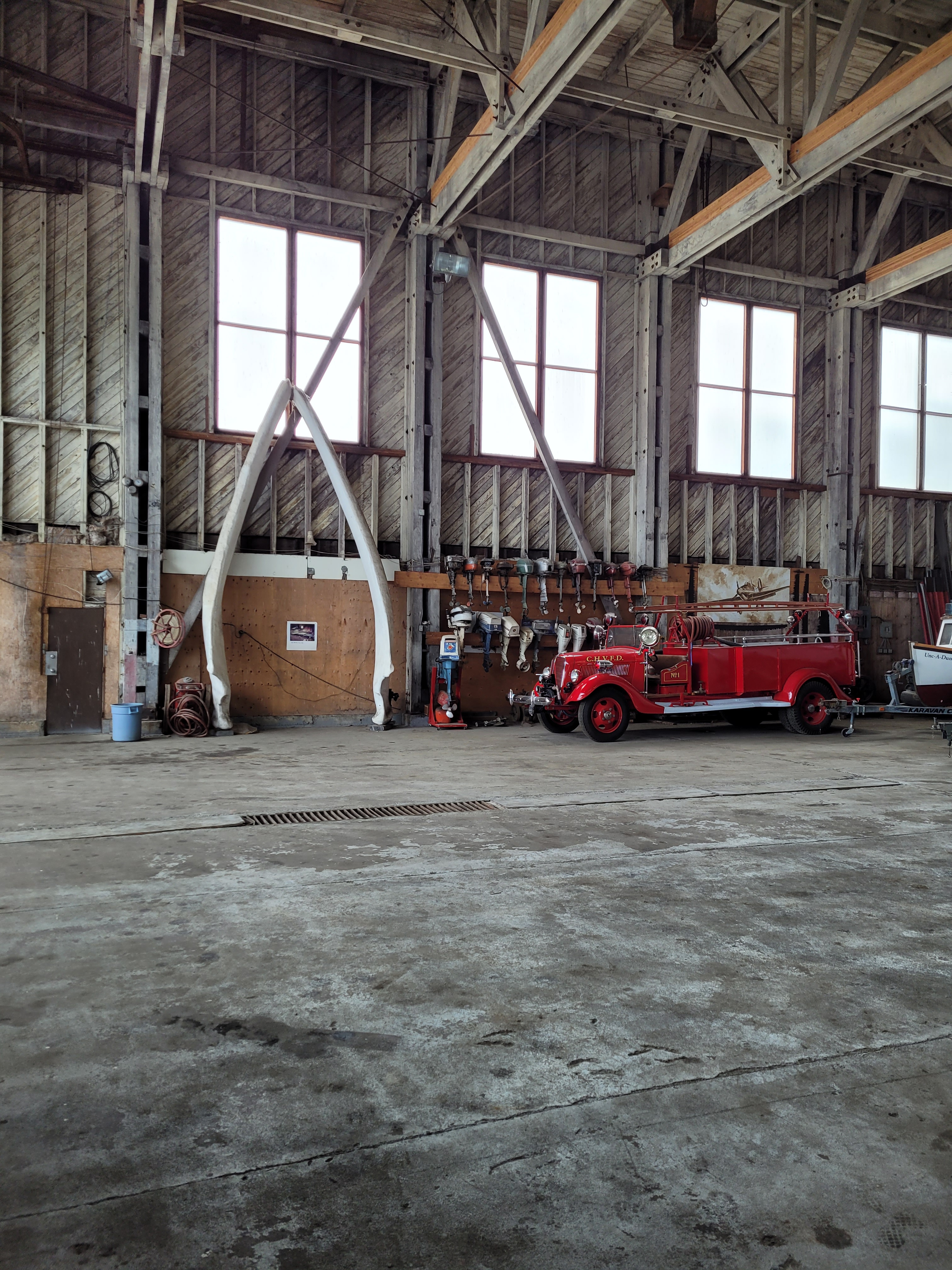
Whale Jaw bone

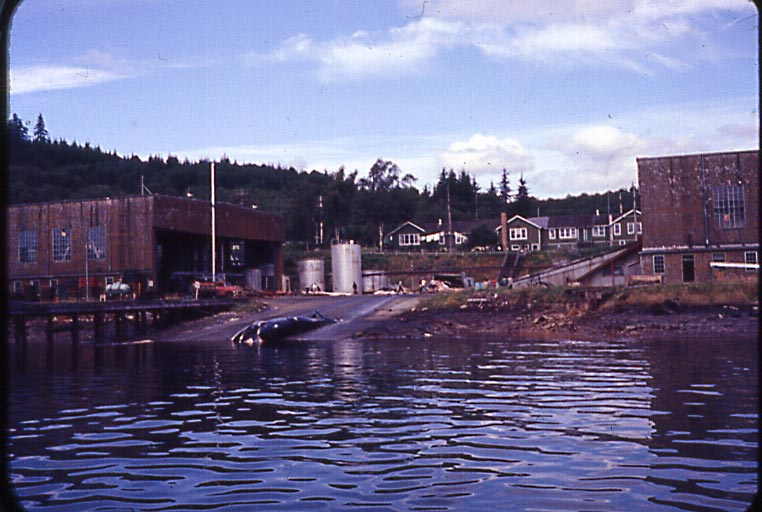
Coal Harbour whale processing plant 1965

== See also ==
- Coal Harbour Water Aerodrome
- List of World War II-era fortifications on the British Columbia Coast
- List of Kwakwaka'wakw villages
