= Alone season 4 =

Alone
- Season 4
- Location of Quatsino in British Columbia Location of the fourth season.
- No. of contestants: 14
- Winners: Jim and Ted Baird
- Runners-up: Pete and Sam Brockdorff
- No. of episodes: 10 (+1 special)

Release
- Original network: History
- Original release: June 15 – August 17, 2017

Season chronology
- ← Previous; Season 3 Next → Season 5

The fourth season of Alone, a.k.a. Alone: Lost & Found, premiered on June 8, 2017. For this season, for the first time participants were in pairs (2) of family members (brother/brother, husband/wife, father/son), with seven teams scattered throughout the island. The prize was still $500,000, which would be split between the two. One member was dropped in the traditional manner, along a beach head with the idea that they'd stay in the relative area for their duration, while the second member was dropped about 10 miles out with only a compass and bearing and needed to hike their way to base camp.

Supply items were still limited to 10 chosen survival tools total, that were split between team members until reconnecting. If one member decided to tap out at any time, the partner was also eliminated. Three teams never met up before tapping out, and it took eight days for the first team to come together. Pete Brockdorff experienced a medical emergency during his and his son's standard tap-out. It was severe chest pains brought on by the acid reflux he developed as a result of the lack of food. Jim and Ted Baird won the season after lasting 75 days.

== Location ==
The fourth season was again set on Vancouver Island, in Quatsino Territory, located near Port Hardy, British Columbia. Teams were set further apart than normal this season, due to the 10 mile radius hike required to meet up at their rendezvous point.

== Episodes ==
No. overall	No. in season	Title	Original release date	U.S. viewers (millions)
35	1	"Divide and Conquer"	June 15, 2017	1.715
"Freedom is something that dies unless it's used." – Hunter S. Thompson
36	2	"Hell on Earth"	June 22, 2017	1.471
"The clearest way into the universe is through a forest wilderness" – John Muir
37	3	"Margin of Error"	June 29, 2017	1.540
"Alone, we can do so little; together we can do so much." – Helen Keller
38	4	"The Last Mile"	July 6, 2017	1.538
"Without a family, man, alone in the world, trembles with the cold." – Andre Maurois
39	5	"Double or Nothing"	July 13, 2017	1.434
"Coming together is a beginning, staying together is progress, and working together is success." – Henry Ford
40	6	"Thicker Than Water"	July 20, 2017	1.539
"Men argue. Nature acts." – Voltaire
41	7	"Hooked"	July 27, 2017	1.638
"Either men will learn to live like brothers, or they will die like beasts." – Max Lerner
42	8	"Flare-Up"	August 3, 2017	1.459
"Hell is other people." – Jean-Paul Sartre
43	9	"My Brother's Keeper"	August 10, 2017	1.410
"The strength of the team is each individual member. The strength of each member is the team." – Phil Jackson
44	10	"Flesh and Blood"	August 17, 2017	1.378
"Heroism is endurance for one moment more." – George F. Kennan
45	11	"Tales From the Island"	August 17, 2017	0.787

== Results ==
Team	Name	Age	Gender	Hometown	Country	Linked up	Status	Reason they tapped out	Ref.
Baird (brothers)	Jim Baird (Note: Hiking team member (other team member sets up camp))	35	Male	Toronto, Ontario	Canada	Day 10	Winners – 75 days	Victor	
Baird (brothers)	Ted Baird	32	Male	Toronto, Ontario	Canada	Day 10	Winners – 75 days	Victor	
Brockdorff (father/son)	Pete Brockdorff (Note: Team member(s) who tapped out.) (Note: During evacuation Pete experienced a medical emergency, and the standard extraction turned into a medical emergency.)	61	Male	Poolesville, Maryland	United States	Day 9	74 days	Jointly decided the cost of the game wasn't worth it; Pete had severe GERD	
Brockdorff (father/son)	Sam Brockdorff	26	Male	Poolesville, Maryland	United States	Day 9	74 days	Jointly decided the cost of the game wasn't worth it; Pete had severe GERD	
Whipple (husband/wife)	Brooke Whipple	45	Female	Fox, Alaska	United States	Day 9	49 days	Felt too exhausted and drained to go on	
Whipple (husband/wife)	Dave Whipple	40	Male	Fox, Alaska	United States	Day 9	49 days	Felt too exhausted and drained to go on	
Wilkes (brothers)	Chris Wilkes	44	Male	Hattiesburg, Mississippi	United States	Day 8	14 days	Missed family and felt guilty for having left them behind	
Wilkes (brothers)	Brody Wilkes	33	Male	Kentwood, Louisiana	United States	Day 8	14 days	Missed family and felt guilty for having left them behind	
Bosdell (brothers)	Shannon Bosdell	44	Male	Wrangell, Alaska	United States	Never	5 days (medically evacuated)	Shannon sustained a lower back injury	
Bosdell (brothers)	Jesse Bosdell	31	Male	Skowhegan, Maine	United States	Never	5 days (medically evacuated)	Shannon sustained a lower back injury	
Ribar (father/son)	Alex Ribar	48	Male	Montville, Maine	United States	Never	2 days	Were not mentally prepared	
Ribar (father/son)	Logan Ribar	19	Male	Liberty, Maine	United States	Never	2 days	Were not mentally prepared	
Richardson (brothers)	Brad Richardson	23	Male	Fox Lake, Illinois	United States	Never	1 day (medically evacuated)	Josh injured his ankle	
Richardson (brothers)	Josh Richardson	19	Male	Fox Lake, Illinois	United States	Never	1 day (medically evacuated)	Josh injured his ankle	
