= Alone season 9 =

Alone
- Season 9
- Location of the ninth season
- No. of contestants: 10
- Winner: Juan Pablo Quiñonez
- Runner-up: Karie Lee Knoke
- No. of episodes: 11

Release
- Original network: History
- Original release: May 26 – August 4, 2022

Season chronology
- ← Previous; Season 8 Next → Season 10

The ninth season of Alone, a.k.a. Alone: Labrador, premiered on May 26, 2022, and was filmed in the Nunatsiavut region of northern Labrador, eastern Canada.

== Location ==
Season 9 participants were dropped in September 2021 along the lower reaches of the Big River, Labrador, Canada, 35 km (21 mi) south of the nearest community of Makkovik. The river is surrounded by dense spruce-fir boreal forest dotted by muskeg bogs of peat and Labrador Tea. The surrounding area is abundant in wildlife including Brook Trout, Canadian Beaver, American Black Bear, Spruce Grouse, and Caribou, with the river visited by harbor seals in fall. Drop off (Day 1) was on September 18, 2021.

Season nine of Alone sets survivalists in a location with one of the harshest weather conditions yet. Enduring wet, snowy, merciless conditions, survivalists' building ingenuity, mental willpower, and overall wilderness skills are put to the test as they must build their own shelters, forage their own food, and overcome numerous obstacles and dangerous predators in hopes of being the last person standing.

— History Channel, April 2022, Alone Season 9

== Episodes ==
No. overall	No. in season	Title	Original release date	U.S. viewers (millions)
90	1	"Drop Shock"	May 26, 2022	N/A
"A journey of a thousand miles must begin with a single step." – Lao Tzu
91	2	"Consequences"	June 2, 2022	N/A
"Don't feel entitled to anything you didn't sweat and struggle for." – Marian Wright Edelman
92	3	"The Law of the Land"	June 9, 2022	N/A
"The future depends on what we do in the present." – Mahatma Gandhi
93	4	"The Beaver"	June 16, 2022	N/A
"It's on the strength of observation and reflection that one finds a way." – Claude Monet
94	5	"The Land Giveth…"	June 23, 2022	N/A
"One thorn of experience is worth a whole wilderness of warning." – James Russell Lowell
95	6	"The Weasel"	June 30, 2022	N/A
"Success does not consist in never making mistakes but in never making the same one a second time." – George Bernard Shaw
96	7	"The Birds"	July 7, 2022	N/A
"And into the forest I go, to lose my mind and find my soul." – John Muir
97	8	"Gut Feeling"	July 14, 2022	N/A
"Never to suffer would never to have been blessed." – Edgar Allen Poe [sic]
98	9	"The Ice Up"	July 21, 2022	N/A
"Never give up, for that is just the place and time that the tide will turn." – Harriet Beecher Stowe
99	10	"Winter's Grasp"	July 28, 2022	N/A
"Solitude was my only consolation – deep, dark, deathlike solitude." – Mary Shelley
100	11	"Fight, Flight or Freeze"	August 4, 2022	N/A
"Out of difficulties grow miracles." – Jean de La Bruyère

== Results ==
Name	Age	Gender	Hometown	Country	Status	Reason they tapped out	Ref.
Juan Pablo Quiñonez	30	Male	Pinawa, Manitoba	Canada	78 days	Winner	
Karie Lee Knoke	57	Female	Sandpoint, Idaho	United States	75 days	Starvation, exhaustion	
Teimojin Tan	31	Male	Montreal, Quebec	Canada	63 days	Missed his family	
Adam Riley	36	Male	Fayetteville, Arkansas	United States	52 days	Starvation	
Jessie Krebs	49	Female	Pagosa Springs, Colorado	United States	46 days (medically evacuated)	Stomach inflammation	
Tom Garstang	35	Male	Earlysville, Virginia	United States	43 days	Fell, injured back and knee	
Terry Burns	31	Male	Homer, Alaska	United States	42 days (medically evacuated)	Low BMI (lost too much weight), parasitic infection	
Benji Hill	46	Male	Bellevue, Idaho	United States	27 days (medically evacuated)	Giardia infection	
Igor Limansky	39	Male	Salt Lake City, Utah	United States	20 days	Heart palpitations, exhaustion	
Jacques Turcotte	23	Male	Juneau, Alaska	United States	15 days	Missed his family	
