= Gwatʼsinux =

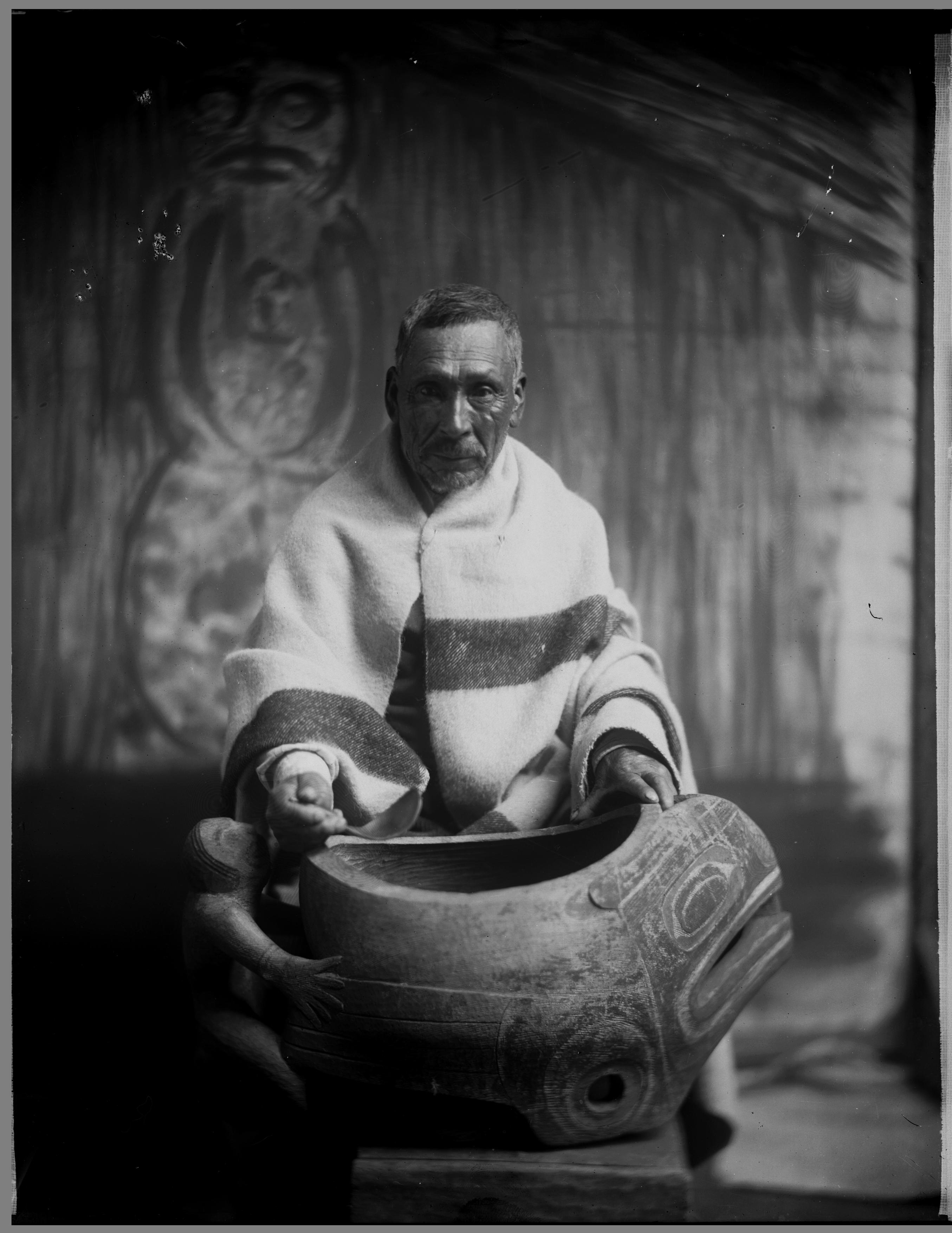
A Gwatʼsinux man sits with a carved wooden bowl

The Gwatʼsinux or Quatsino, meaning the "northern people", for whom Quatsino Sound on northern Vancouver Island is named, are one of the main subdivisions of the Kwakwakaʼwakw peoples.

Their legends tell of their creation by the Great Spirit, while an alternate meaning of their name is "people of the outside."

They were organized into the Quatsino First Nation as a band government during the process of colonization under the Indian Act.

Before the 19th century, they were one of five loosely related tribes in the Quatsino region, who were of the same remote origin; only later did they bind together into a single tribe. Their numbers were devastated by epidemics brought in by European sailors.

The aristocracy of the tribe traditionally shaped their baby girls' heads.
