= Alone season 8 =

Alone
- Season 8
- Location of Chilko Lake in British Columbia Location of the eighth season
- No. of contestants: 10
- Winner: Clay Hayes
- Runner-up: Biko Wright
- No. of episodes: 12

Release
- Original network: History
- Original release: June 3 – August 19, 2021

Season chronology
- ← Previous; Season 7 Next → Season 9

The eighth season of Alone, a.k.a. Alone: Grizzly Mountain, premiered on June 3, 2021. The season reverts to the original format of the show, with the last person standing declared the winner and awarded $500,000. At the end of most episodes in which a contestant taps out, Season 6 contestant and fifth-place finisher Nikki van Schyndel (a survival expert and first responder) conducts a short exit interview at base camp a few days after the tap out.

== Location ==
The eighth season is set along the shores of high-elevation Chilko Lake (Tŝilhqox Biny), British Columbia, a 40-mile long remote glacial lake on the dry eastern side of the Coast Mountains. The lake's surface is at over 3800 ft above sea level, making Season 8 the first Alpine season of Alone, being over 1000 ft higher in elevation than the next-highest season, Season 3, in Patagonia. Drop off (Day 1) was on September 18, 2020.

== Episodes ==
No. overall	No. in season	Title	Original release date	U.S. viewers (millions)
78	1	"The Hunted"	June 3, 2021	1.338
"The worst cruelty that can be inflicted on a human being is isolation." – Sukarno
79	2	"Open Season"	June 10, 2021	1.561
"True wilderness can still be found, but it's hard to reach and dangerous when you get there." – Michelle Paver
80	3	"Chewed Up"	June 17, 2021	1.396
"It is not because things are difficult that we do not dare; it is because we do not dare that they are difficult." – Seneca
81	4	"Far From Home"	June 24, 2021	1.419
"Men are not prisoners of fate, but only prisoners of their own minds." – Franklin D. Roosevelt
82	5	"The Buck"	July 1, 2021	1.406
"Only by going alone in silence, without baggage, can one truly get into the heart of the wilderness." – John Muir
83	6	"Smoked"	July 8, 2021	1.362
"Success is the sum of small efforts, repeated day in and day out." – Robert Collier
84	7	"Surrounded"	July 15, 2021	1.705
"In nature there are neither rewards nor punishments; there are consequences." – Robert Green Ingersoll
85	8	"The Grizzly"	July 22, 2021	1.507
"I think nature's imagination is so much greater than man's, she's never going to let us relax." – Richard Feyman [sic]
86	9	"The Troll"	August 5, 2021	N/A
"We have nowhere else to go… This is all we have." – Margaret Mead
87	10	"All In"	August 12, 2021	N/A
"Adversity has the effect of eliciting talents which in prosperous circumstances would have lain dormant." – Horace
88	11	"The Reckoning"	August 19, 2021	N/A
"The rewards for those who persevere far exceed the pain that must precede the victory." – Ted Engstrom
89	12	"Ultimate Moments"	August 19, 2021	N/A

== Results ==
Name	Age	Gender	Hometown	Country	Status	Reason they tapped out	Ref.
Clay Hayes	39	Male	Kendrick, Idaho	United States	74 days	Victor	
Biko Wright	29	Male	Otis, Oregon	United States	73 days	Starvation, heart palpitations	
Theresa Emmerich Kamper	39	Female	Exeter, England	United Kingdom	69 days (medically evacuated)	Low BMI, lost too much weight	
Colter Barnes	36	Male	Inian Islands, Alaska	United States	67 days (medically evacuated)	Low BMI, lost too much weight	
Rose Anna Moore	43	Female	Wellsboro, Pennsylvania	United States	37 days (medically evacuated)	Frostbite, malnutrition	
Nate Weber	47	Male	East Jordan, Michigan	United States	24 days	Food poisoning	
Matt Corradino	42	Male	St. Croix	U.S. Virgin Islands	22 days	Missed his family	
Michelle Finn	46	Female	Cherryfield, Maine	United States	21 days	Starvation	
Jordon Bell	43	Male	Oak Ridge, Tennessee	United States	19 days	Missed his family	
Tim Madsen	48	Male	Laramie, Wyoming	United States	6 days (medically evacuated)	Anxiety attack, chest pains	
