= Alone season 5 =

Alone
- Season 5
- Location of Khonin Nuga valley in Selenge Province, Mongolia Location of the fifth season.
- No. of contestants: 10
- Winner: Sam Larson
- Runner-up: Britt Ahart
- No. of episodes: 10

Release
- Original network: History
- Original release: June 14 – August 16, 2018

Season chronology
- ← Previous; Season 4 Next → Season 6

The fifth season of Alone, a.k.a. Alone: Redemption, premiered on June 14, 2018. Marketed as a "crossover", its 10 contestants are non-winners selected from the previous four seasons of Alone.

== Location ==
The fifth season was set in Northern Mongolia in Asia. The series was filmed in Khonin Nuga near the city of Züünkharaa, Selenge aimag. "Khonin Nuga" is a valley located close to the Khentii Mountains of Northern Mongolia, one of the country's unique and still largely untouched places.

== Episodes ==
No. overall	No. in season	Title	Original release date	U.S. viewers (millions)
46	1	"Redemption"	June 14, 2018	1.409
"Never confuse a single defeat with a final defeat." – F. Scott Fitzgerald
47	2	"The Haunting"	June 21, 2018	1.296
"All men make mistakes, but only wise men learn from their mistakes." – Winston Churchill
48	3	"The Serpent"	June 28, 2018	1.398
"It is not the mountains we conquer, but ourselves." – Sir Edmund Hillary
49	4	"Mongolia's Wrath"	July 5, 2018	1.188
"Nature, in her untamed state, is savage and unrelenting." – Fennel Hudson
50	5	"The Bowels Of Hell"	July 12, 2018	1.253
"Over every mountain there is a path, though it may not be seen from the valley." – Theodore Roethke
51	6	"Of Mice And Men"	July 19, 2018	1.657
"...we do not own these woods. They own us." – Timothy Goodwin
52	7	"Desperate Measures"	July 26, 2018	1.661
"Redemption can be found in hell itself if that's where you happen to be." – Lin Jensen
53	8	"Slayer II"	August 2, 2018	1.350
"Solitude, isolation are painful things, and beyond human endurance." – Jules Verne
54	9	"Starvation's Shadow"	August 9, 2018	1.429
"The mountains are calling and I must go." – John Muir
55	10	"Cold War"	August 16, 2018	1.563
"By endurance we conquer." – Ernest Shackleton

== Results ==
Name	Age	Gender	Hometown	Country	Original season	Status	Reason they tapped out	Ref.
Sam Larson	25	Male	Lincoln, Nebraska	United States	1	Winner – 60 days	Victor	
Britt Ahart	41	Male	Mantua, Ohio	United States	3	56 days	Missed his family	
Larry Roberts	46	Male	Rush City, Minnesota	United States	2	41 days	Missed his family	
Dave Nessia	50	Male	Salt Lake City, Utah	United States	3	36 days	Just felt "right"	
Randy Champagne	31	Male	Boulder, Utah	United States	2	35 days	Lonely	
Brooke Whipple	45	Female	Fox, Alaska	United States	4	28 days	Lonely	
Jesse Bosdell	32	Male	Skowhegan, Maine	United States	4	24 days (medically evacuated)	Constipation, possible fecal impaction	
Nicole Apelian	47	Female	Raymond, Washington	United States	2	9 days (medically evacuated)	MS attack	
Brad Richardson	24	Male	Fox Lake, Illinois	United States	4	7 days	Had no food the whole time	
Carleigh Fairchild	30	Female	Anchorage, Alaska	United States	3	5 days (medically evacuated)	Fish hook in hand	
