= Alone season 10 =

Alone
- Season 10
- Location of the 10th season
- No. of contestants: 10
- Winner: Alan Tenta
- Runner-up: James "Wyatt" Black
- No. of episodes: 11

Release
- Original network: History
- Original release: June 8 – August 17, 2023

Season chronology
- ← Previous; Season 9 Next → Season 11

The tenth season of Alone, a.k.a. Alone: Saskatchewan, premiered on June 8, 2023. It is set in the Reindeer Lake region of northern Saskatchewan.

== Location ==
Reindeer Lake, Saskatchewan, Canada. Drop Off (Day 1) was on September 18, 2022.

== Episodes ==
No. overall	No. in season	Title	Original release date	U.S. viewers (millions)
101	1	"Game On"	June 8, 2023	N/A
"The pathway to glory is rough, and many gloomy hours obscure it." – Chief Black Hawk
102	2	"Ties That Bind"	June 15, 2023	N/A
"Tactics without strategy is the noise before defeat." – Sun Tzu
103	3	"Growing Pains"	June 22, 2023	N/A
"Going to the mountains is going home." – John Muir
104	4	"Lake of Thieves"	June 29, 2023	N/A
"We first make our habits, then our habits make us." – John Dryden
105	5	"Spirit Bear"	July 6, 2023	N/A
"The art of life is a constant readjustment our surroundings." – Okakura Kakuzō
106	6	"King's Gambit"	July 13, 2023	N/A
"When patterns are broken, new worlds emerge." – Tuli Kupferberg
107	7	"Aftermath"	July 20, 2023	N/A
"We may encounter defeats, but we must not be defeated." – Maya Angelou
108	8	"Infestation"	July 27, 2023	N/A
"Perseverance is not a long race; it is many short races one after the other." – Walter Elliot
109	9	"Splintered"	August 3, 2023	N/A
"Man is not what he thinks he is, he is what he hides." – André Malraux
110	10	"Rats"	August 10, 2023	N/A
"We must embrace pain and burn it as fuel for our journey." – Kenji Miyazawa
111	11	"By Any Means"	August 17, 2023	N/A
"Buck up, do your damnedest, and fight." – Robert Service, The Quitter

== Results ==
Name	Age	Gender	Hometown	Country	Status	Reason they tapped out	Ref.
Alan Tenta	52	Male	Columbia Valley, British Columbia	Canada	66 days	Winner	
James "Wyatt" Black	50	Male	Bracebridge, Ontario	Canada	64 days	Felt journey was complete	
Mikey Helton	31	Male	Rome, Georgia	United States	55 days	Severe hypothermia risk (Tapped out in lieu of medical evacuation)	
Melanie Sawyer	54	Female	Moriah, New York	United States	43 days	Felt her journey was complete	
Tarcisio “Taz” Ramos Dos Santos	35	Male	Becket, Massachusetts	United States	40 days	Starvation	
Cade Cole	28	Male	Crowheart, Wyoming	United States	23 days	Loss of Consciousness	
Jodi Rose	45	Female	Worland, Wyoming	United States	22 days	Missed her family	
Luke Joseph Olsen	39	Male	Maui, Hawaii	United States	20 days	Intestinal problems	
Ann Rosenquist	56	Female	Bayfield, Wisconsin	United States	19 days	Starvation, heart palpitations	
Lee Ray DeWilden	59	Male	Huslia, Alaska	United States	18 days	Starvation	
