= Alone season 7 =

Alone
- Season 7
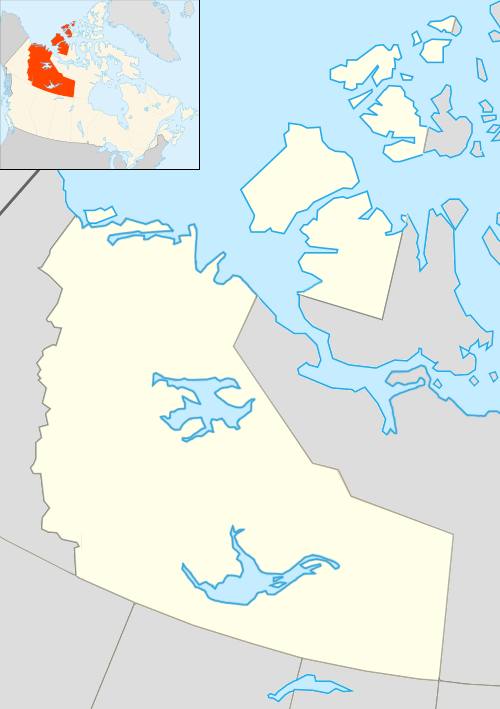
- Location of the east arm of Great Slave Lake in Northwest Territories Location of the seventh season.
- No. of contestants: 10
- Winner: Roland Welker
- Runner-up: Callie Russell
- No. of episodes: 11

Release
- Original network: History
- Original release: June 11 – August 20, 2020

Season chronology
- ← Previous; Season 6 Next → Season 8

The seventh season of Alone, a.k.a. Alone: Million Dollar Challenge, premiered on June 11, 2020. Unlike the previous seasons, instead of trying to outlast all of their competitors, the ultimate goal for the participants was to survive for 100 days on their own, which meant that there was a possibility of multiple winners—or conversely, no winners at all. At the end of each episode host Colby Donaldson lets the contestants comment on the episode which is accompanied by "never before seen footage."

== Location ==
The seventh season is again set along the shore of the east arm of Great Slave Lake in the Northwest Territories of Canada. Drop off (Day 1) was on September 18, 2019.

== Episodes ==
No. overall	No. in season	Title	Original release date	U.S. viewers (millions)
67	1	"Million Dollar Mistake"	June 11, 2020	1.127
"Whosoever is delighted in solitude is either a wild beast or a god." – Aristotle
68	2	"The Rock House"	June 18, 2020	1.285
"Fortitude is the marshal of thought, the armor of the will, and the fort of reason." – Francis Bacon
69	3	"That Was No Bunny"	June 25, 2020	1.251
"Life is a walk through the forest. Don't fear the trees; fear what lurks behind them." – Richelle E. Goodrich
70	4	"The Fly"	July 2, 2020	1.362
"Let food be thy medicine and medicine be thy food." – Hippocrates
71	5	"The Rock"	July 9, 2020	1.374
"Failure is not fatal, but failure to change might be." – John Wooden
72	6	"The Musk Ox"	July 16, 2020	1.332
"Chaos was the law of nature; Order was the dream of man." – Henry Adams
73	7	"Snared"	July 23, 2020	1.274
"When you reach the end of your rope, tie a knot in it and hang on." – Franklin D. Roosevelt
74	8	"Up In Smoke"	July 30, 2020	1.252
"To survive it is often necessary to fight and to fight you have to dirty yourself." – George Orwell
75	9	"The Wolves"	August 6, 2020	1.237
"Let me not pray to be sheltered from dangers but to be fearless in facing them." – Rabindranath Tagore
76	10	"Pins and Needles"	August 13, 2020	1.546
"Fate leads the willing, and drags along the reluctant." – Seneca
77	11	"Over the Edge"	August 20, 2020	1.335
"The best way out is always through." – Robert Frost

== Results ==
Name	Age	Gender	Hometown	Country	Status	Reason they tapped out	Ref.
Roland Welker	47	Male	Red Devil, Alaska	United States	Winner – 101 days	Victory	
Callie Russell	31	Female	Flathead Valley, Montana	United States	89 days (medically evacuated)	Frostbite of the toes	
Kielyn Marrone	33	Female	Espanola, Ontario	Canada	80 days	Starvation	
Amós Rodriguez	40	Male	Indianapolis, Indiana	United States	58 days	Starvation	
Mark D'Ambrosio	33	Male	Vancouver, Washington	United States	44 days	Parasite	
Joe Nicholas	31	Male	Redding, California	United States	44 days	Starvation	
Joel Van Der Loon	34	Male	Sisters, Oregon	United States	40 days	Starvation	
Keith Syers	45	Male	Sturgis, Kentucky	United States	22 days (medically evacuated)	Food poisoning, infection	
Correy Hawk	30	Male	Plattsmouth, Nebraska	United States	12 days (medically evacuated)	Torn Meniscus, partially torn MCL	
Shawn Helton	43	Male	Henry, Tennessee	United States	10 days	Lost fire starter	
