= Alone season 6 =

Alone
- Season 6
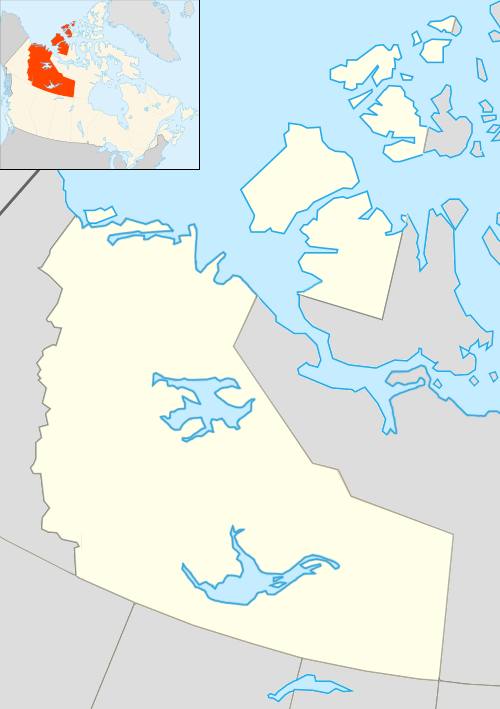
- Location of the east arm of Great Slave Lake in Northwest Territories Location of the sixth season.
- No. of contestants: 10
- Winner: Jordan Jonas
- Runner-up: Woniya Thibeault
- No. of episodes: 11

Release
- Original network: History
- Original release: June 6 – August 22, 2019

Season chronology
- ← Previous; Season 5 Next → Season 7

The sixth season of Alone, a.k.a. Alone: The Arctic, premiered on June 6, 2019.

== Location ==
Season Six is set along the shore of the east arm of Great Slave Lake in the Northwest Territories of Canada, about 400 km (250 mi) south of the Arctic Circle and about 120 km (75 mi) south of the arctic tree line.

== Episodes ==
No. overall	No. in season	Title	Original release date	U.S. viewers (millions)
56	1	"Icebreaker"	June 6, 2019	1.153
"Our food lies ahead and death stalks us from behind." – Ernest Shackleton
57	2	"Tainted"	June 13, 2019	1.281
"Laws change; people die; the land remains." – Abraham Lincoln
58	3	"Up in Flames"	June 20, 2019	1.321
"This is no time for ease and comfort. It is the time to dare and endure." – Winston Churchill
59	4	"The Moose"	June 27, 2019	1.439
"A failure is not always a mistake... The real mistake is to stop trying." – B.F. Skinner
60	5	"The Kill"	July 11, 2019	1.168
"For suffering and enduring there is no remedy but striving and doing." – Thomas Carlyle
61	6	"Ablaze"	July 18, 2019	1.168
"The most difficult thing is the decision to act. The rest is merely tenacity." – Amelia Earhart
62	7	"Night Raider"	July 25, 2019	1.141
"Come what may, all bad fortune is to be conquered by endurance." – Virgil
63	8	"Out Cold"	August 1, 2019	1.068
"He who conquers others is strong. He who conquers himself is mighty." – Lao Tzu
64	9	"The Ice Cometh"	August 8, 2019	0.989
"Wisdom comes alone through suffering." – Aeschylus
65	10	"Thin Ice"	August 15, 2019	1.358
"Adapt or perish, now as ever, is nature's inexorable imperative." – H. G. Wells
66	11	"Fire and Ice"	August 22, 2019	1.384
"One day, in retrospect, the years of struggle will strike you as the most beautiful." – Sigmund Freud

== Results ==
Name	Age	Gender	Hometown	Country	Status	Reason they tapped out	Ref.
Jordan Jonas	35	Male	Lynchburg, Virginia	United States	Winner – 77 days	Victor	
Woniya Thibeault	42	Female	Grass Valley, California	United States	73 days	Starvation	
Nathan Donnelly	39	Male	Lopez Island, Washington	United States	72 days	Shelter fire	
Barry Karcher	39	Male	Fort Collins, Colorado	United States	69 days (medically evacuated)	Lost too much weight	
Nikki van Schyndel	44	Female	Echo Bay, British Columbia	Canada	52 days (medically evacuated)	Low BMI, lost too much weight	
Michelle Wohlberg	31	Female	Mullingar, Saskatchewan	Canada	48 days (medically evacuated)	Constipation, possible impacted bowel	
Brady Nicholls	36	Male	San Antonio, Texas	United States	32 days	Missed his family	
Ray Livingston	43	Male	Vancouver, Washington	United States	19 days	Nothing left to give	
Donny Dust	38	Male	Monument, Colorado	United States	8 days (medically evacuated)	Food poisoning	
Tim Backus	55	Male	Lubbock, Texas	United States	4 days (medically evacuated)	Broken ankle	
