= Alone season 3 =

Alone
- Season 3
- Location of Lakes Soberania, Montes and Escondido in Patagonia, Argentina Location of the third season.
- No. of contestants: 10
- Winner: Zachary Fowler
- Runner-up: Carleigh Fairchild
- No. of episodes: 10

Release
- Original network: History
- Original release: December 8, 2016 – February 9, 2017

Season chronology
- ← Previous; Season 2 Next → Season 4

The third season of Alone, a.k.a. Alone: Patagonia, premiered on December 8, 2016. The winner, Zachary Fowler, had lost 70 lbs, a third of his starting body weight, before the end of his stay. Season 3 marked the first time a contestant was pulled for medical reasons. The first was fourth place, Dave Nessia, who was pulled out when, due to inadequate caloric intake, his systolic pressure barely exceeded his diastolic pressure (80/60 mmHg), putting him in danger of death due to inadequate perfusion of the internal organs. He had been in starvation mode for so long, even though he left with 33 halves of dried fish still ready to eat, he was surviving with the thought of only eating half a fish every other day.

The second, and the person who stayed the second-longest, Carleigh Fairchild, was pulled out because, at 101 lbs/45.8 kg, she had lost nearly 30% of her starting body weight and had a BMI of 16.8. Participants are automatically "pulled" at a BMI of 17 or less.

== Location ==
The third season was set in Patagonia, Argentina, in South America. The contestants were spread across multiple lakes in the foothills of the Andes mountain range. Unlike in seasons 1 and 2, which were located on the Pacific Ocean, season 3's food resources were mostly limited to brook and rainbow trout, forage, small birds, and the possibility of wild boar. Contestants also were at a disadvantage because they had no access to the flotsam and jetsam that washes up on the Pacific Coast. They also had no salt source.

The weather in Patagonia is comparable to that of Vancouver Island, with rainfall averaging 78 inches a year. However, unlike Vancouver Island, snowfall is extremely common in the winter.

Predators in Patagonia include wild boar and puma.

== Episodes ==
| No. overall | No. in season | Title | Original release date | U.S. viewers (millions) |
|---|---|---|---|---|
| 25 | 1 | "A New Land" | December 8, 2016 | 1.245 |
"The first virtue in a soldier is endurance; courage is only the second virtue." – Napoleon Bonaparte
| 26 | 2 | "First Blood" | December 15, 2016 | 1.499 |
"If people think nature is their friend, then they sure don't need an enemy." – Kurt Vonnegut
| 27 | 3 | "Eternal Darkness" | December 22, 2016 | 1.543 |
"The very basic core of a man's living spirit is his passion for adventure." – Christopher McCandless
| 28 | 4 | "Outfoxed" | December 29, 2016 | 1.732 |
"With foxes we must play the fox." – Thomas Fuller
| 29 | 5 | "The Lone Wolf" | January 5, 2017 | 1.790 |
"Fortune always favors the brave, and never helps a man who does not help himself." – P. T. Barnum
| 30 | 6 | "Along Came a Spider" | January 12, 2017 | 1.855 |
"All that an obstacle does with brave men is, not to frighten them, but to challenge them." – Woodrow Wilson
| 31 | 7 | "Hungry Beasts" | January 19, 2017 | 1.748 |
"If you don't hunt it down and kill it, it will hunt you down and kill you." – Flannery O'Connor
| 32 | 8 | "Of Feast & Famine" | January 26, 2017 | 1.811 |
"We are all sentenced to solitary confinement inside our own skins, for life." – Tennessee Williams
| 33 | 9 | "The Point of No Return" | February 2, 2017 | 1.864 |
"Being alone is scary, but not as scary as feeling alone." – Amelia Earhart
| 34 | 10 | "Day 87" | February 9, 2017 | 2.117 |
"I have often marveled at the thin line which separates success from failure." – Ernest Shackleton

== Results ==
| Name | Age | Gender | Hometown | Country | Status | Reason they tapped out | Ref. |
|---|---|---|---|---|---|---|---|
| Zachary Fowler | 36 | Male | Appleton, Maine | United States | Winner – 87 days | Victor | |
| Carleigh Fairchild | 29 | Female | Edna Bay, Alaska | United States | 86 days (medically evacuated) | BMI too low | |
| Megan Hanacek | 41 | Female | Port McNeill, British Columbia | Canada | 78 days | 2 broken teeth (molars), jaw pain | |
| Dave Nessia | 49 | Male | Salt Lake City, Utah | United States | 73 days (medically evacuated) | Systolic pressure too low | |
| Callie North | 27 | Female | Lopez Island, Washington | United States | 72 days | Felt her journey was complete | |
| Greg Ovens | 53 | Male | Canal Flats, British Columbia | Canada | 51 days | Hypothermia | |
| Dan Wowak | 34 | Male | Mahanoy City, Pennsylvania | United States | 51 days | Missed family | |
| Britt Ahart | 40 | Male | Mantua, Ohio | United States | 35 days | Missed family | |
| Zach Gault | 22 | Male | Caledon, Ontario | Canada | 8 days (medically evacuated) | Cut arm with ax | |
| Jim Shields | 37 | Male | Langhorne, Pennsylvania | United States | 3 days | Regretted leaving family | |
