= Alone season 11 =

Alone
- Season 11
- Location of the 11th season
- No. of contestants: 10
- Winner: William Larkham Jr.
- Runner-up: Timber Cleghorn
- No. of episodes: 12

Release
- Original network: History
- Original release: June 13 – August 29, 2024

Season chronology
- ← Previous; Season 10 Next → Season 12

The eleventh season of Alone, a.k.a. Alone: Arctic Circle, premiered on June 13, 2024. It is set in the northernmost location yet, within the Arctic Circle near Inuvik in the Northwest Territories.

== Location ==
Mackenzie River Delta approximately 125 mi (201 km) north of the Arctic Circle near Inuvik in the Northwest Territories. Drop Off (Day 1) was on September 18, 2023.

== Production ==
This season used the Gwich'in Tribal Council wellness camp just south of Inuvik from August to December 2023 as the staging camp for the production crew.

== Episodes ==
No. overall	No. in season	Title	Original release date	U.S. viewers (millions)
112	1	"Enter The Circle"	June 13, 2024	N/A
"For a man to conquer himself is the first and noblest of all victories." — Plato
113	2	"Opportunity Cost"	June 20, 2024	N/A
"When opportunity comes, it's too late to prepare." — John Wooden
114	3	"Fortune"	June 27, 2024	N/A
"In every walk with nature, one receives far more than he seeks." — John Muir
115	4	"Legacy"	July 11, 2024	N/A
"There is no education like adversity." — Benjamin Disraeli
116	5	"Something In The Air"	July 18, 2024	N/A
"If we believe that tomorrow will be better, we can bear a hardship today." — Thích Nhất Hạnh
117	6	"Murphy's Law"	July 25, 2024	N/A
"Little by little, a little becomes a lot." — Tanzanian Proverb
118	7	"One Pike at a Time"	August 1, 2024	N/A
"Not everything that is faced can be changed, but nothing can be changed until it is faced." — James Baldwin
119	8	"The Marten Chronicles"	August 8, 2024	N/A
"In every conceivable manner, the family is link to our past, bridge to our future." — Alex Haley
120	9	"The Wormhole"	August 15, 2024	N/A
"In a completely sane world, madness is the only freedom." — J.G. Ballard
121	10	"Symphony of Solitude"	August 22, 2024	N/A
"First fight. Then fiddle." — Gwendolyn Brooks
122	11	"Collapse"	August 29, 2024	N/A
"Worry does not empty tomorrow of its sorrow, it empties today of its strength." — Corrie ten Boom
123	12	"Into the Dark"	August 29, 2024	N/A
"A man with outward courage dares to die; a man with inner courage dares to live." — Lao Tzu

== Results ==
Name	Age	Gender	Hometown	Country	Status	Reason they tapped out	Ref.
William Larkham Jr.	49	Male	Happy Valley-Goose Bay, Newfoundland and Labrador	Canada	84 Days	Winner	
Timber Cleghorn	35	Male	Salem, Indiana	United States	83 Days	Achieved personal goals	
Dub Paetz	44	Male	Frederic, Michigan	United States	80 Days	Effects of starvation and isolation, missed his family	
Sarah Poynter	48	Female	Skwentna, Alaska	United States	42 Days	Kidney pain	
Isaiah Tuck	36	Male	Ghent, West Virginia	United States	23 Days	Severe chest pains	
Jake Messinger	42	Male	Fremont County, Idaho	United States	21 Days (medically evacuated)	Bowel obstruction	
Michela Carriere	34	Female	Cumberland House, Saskatchewan	Canada	18 Days	Loneliness and isolation	
Dusty Blake	36	Male	Fifty-Six, Arkansas	United States	10 Days	Severe gastric pain	
Peter Albano	42	Male	Castlegar, British Columbia	Canada	8 Days	Emotional breakdown	
Cubby Hoover	33	Male	Seligman, Missouri	United States	4 Days	Deep arrow wound to leg	
