= Kyuquot (disambiguation) =

Kyuquot, pronounced "ky YOO cut", meaning "people of Kayukw" in the Nuu-chah-nulth language, may refer to:

- Kyuquot, an unincorporated settlement on northwestern Vancouver Island, British Columbia
- Kyuquot Sound, British Columbia (including Kyuquot Bay, Kyuquot Channel)
- The Kyuquot/Cheklesahht First Nation, the joint band government of the Kyuquot and Cheklesahht peoples of Kyuquot Sound
- The Kyuquot Water Aerodrome
