= Checleset Bay =

Bay in British Columbia, Canada

- French: Baie Checleset
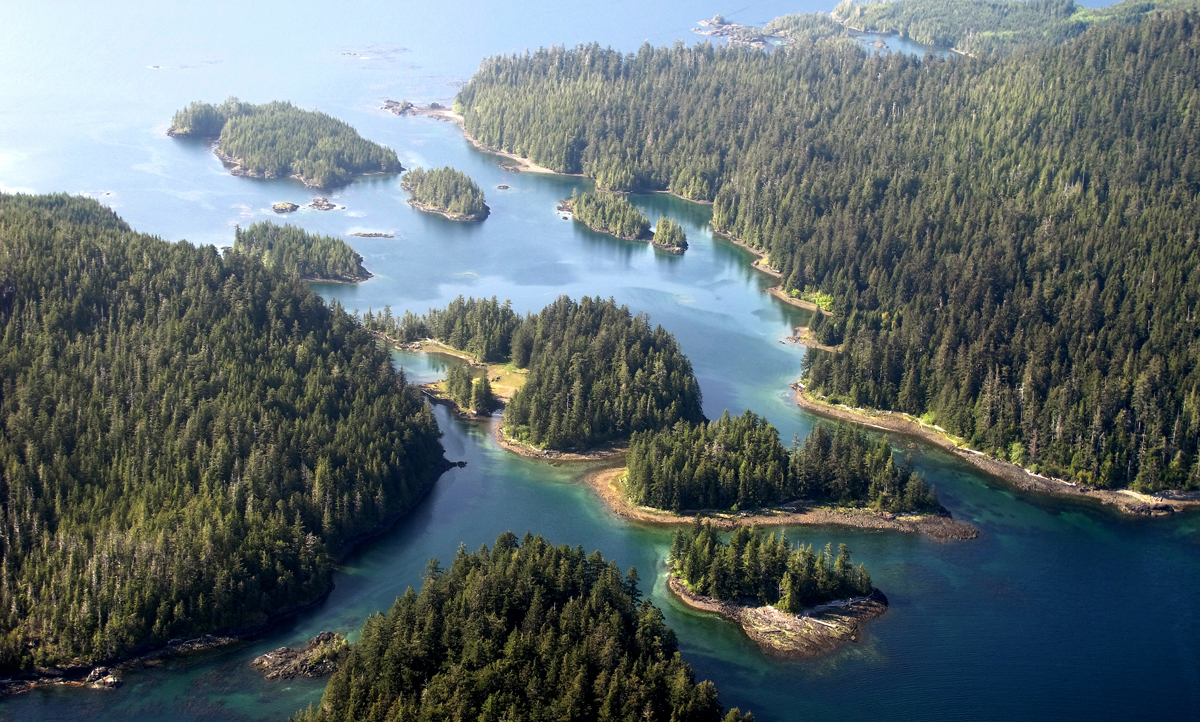
- Big Bunsby Marine Provincial Park in Checleset Bay

- Location in British Columbia
- Location: Vancouver Island, British Columbia
- Coordinates: 50°05′45″N 127°35′37″W
- Type: Bay
- Ocean/sea sources: Pacific Ocean

Checleset Bay is a bay on the northwest coast of Vancouver Island, British Columbia, Canada. It is located southeast of Brooks Peninsula and northwest of Kyuquot Sound. Much of the land around the bay is part of Brooks Peninsula Provincial Park. Checleset Bay has three large inlets, Nasparti Inlet, Ououkinsh Inlet, and Malksope Inlet.

== Etymology ==
Checleset Bay was named in the late 1930s in association with the Kyuquot/Cheklesahht First Nation of nearby Kyuquot Sound. This First Nation, today officially spelled Che:k:tles7et'h', was historical spelled in various ways such as Checleset and Cheklesaht. They once occupied the shores of Checleset Bay until moving to Mission Island in the 1950s. Today they live at Houpsitas on Kyuquot Sound.

== Geography ==
Historically, Checleset Bay was the northernmost area of the Nuu-chah-nulth First Nations. The land north of Checleset Bay and Brooks Peninsula was Kwakwakaʼwakw territory, with the Klaskino being the southernmost of the Kwakwakaʼwakw people. Today the Klaskino are part of the Quatsino First Nation, whose territory lies just north of Checleset Bay and Brooks Peninsula. The Che:k:tles7et'h' (Cheklesahht) people lived in the Checleset Bay area. Their main winter village was at Upsowis, and the summer village at Acous. Besides these there were at least 34 other village sites, 10 refuges, 8 camps, 7 fish traps, 3 fish weirs, 11 burial caves, and 2 cemeteries on the shores of Checleset Bay.

Near the mouth of Nasparti Inlet is Columbia Cove, named for the maritime fur trade ship Columbia Rediviva, which under Captain Robert Gray anchored here in June 1791 and July 1792. The name dates back to the 1790s. It was used by Gray's officer Robert Haswell and several times by John Boit in his log of the Union, which anchored in the cove in 1795. An islet at the entrance of Columbia Cove is known as Boit Rock, after John Boit.

Deeper into Nasparti Inlet is Johnson Lagoon, an inlet-like saltwater lake narrowly connected to Nasparti Inlet. Tidal currents are funneled through the narrow opening, resulting in dangerous tidal rapids.

The Acous Peninsula lies between Nasparti Inlet and Ououkinsh Inlet. Acous was the main Che:k:tles7et'h' (Cheklesahht) summer village, located near the point of Acous Peninsula. Although long abandoned, the village site still contains old carvings and house posts.

Just east of Acous Peninsula, at the entrance of Ououkinsh Inlet is Battle Bay. Nearby is the former Cheklesahht village of Mahope.

Near the head of Ououkinsh Inlet is the mouth of the Power River, which flows through the Hisnit River Watershed Protected Area and Power Lake before emptying into Ououkinsh Inlet near the former Cheklesahht village of Hisnit. Hisnit was an important sockeye salmon fishing site. The Ououkinsh River flows into the head of Ououkinsh Inlet. At the river's mouth is another former Cheklesahht village, called Ououkinsh.

Between Ououkinsh Inlet and Malksope Inlet lie the Bunsby Islands, named in 1862 by Captain George Henry Richards after a character in the Charles Dickens novel Dombey and Son. Among the islands is Big Bunsby Marine Provincial Park. Che:k'tles7et'h' Island is one of the southwesternmost Bunsby Islands. This island was once an Indian Reserve but in 2011 was transferred in fee simple to the Kyuquot/Cheklesahht First Nation.

Malksope Inlet, whose preferred modern spelling is Maq:cup, is the easternmost inlet of Checleset Bay. Near its entrance is the site of Upsowis, the former main winter village of the Cheklesahht. The Malkscope (Maq:cup) River flows into the head of Malkscope Inlet. Near the river's mouth is the former Cheklesahht village Maq:cup.

== Conservation ==
Most of Checleset Bay is protected as the 34,650-hectare (85,600-acre) Checleset Bay Ecological Reserve, which was established in 1981 for the reintroduction of sea otters, which were once abundant but hunted to local extinction in British Columbia during the maritime fur trade era. Around 1970 89 sea otters were brought from Alaska to Checleset Bay. By 1984 there were about 200 in the reserve and about 150 more in the surrounding area. By 2013 their range had expanded over much of the coasts of western and northern Vancouver Island and elsewhere, with a total population of about 5,600.

Long designated endangered, today sea otters are designated "Special Concern" under the federal Canadian Species at Risk Act. In addition they are protected by the Marine Mammal Regulations in the federal Fisheries Act. They are listed as "Threatened" under the British Columbia Wildlife Act. For these reasons motorized watercraft are not allowed in Checleset Bay and there are restrictions or bans on activities like fishing and camping. To land on the shore requires a request for permission. Research and educational activities require special permits.
