= Kyuquot =

- Location of Kyuquot in British Columbia
- Coordinates: 50°02′00″N 127°22′27″W
- Country: Canada
- Province: British Columbia
- Area codes: 250, 778

Kyuquot (Ḵa:’yu:’k’t’h’ or qaay̓uuk̓tḥ in Nuu-chah-nulth, pronounced ky-YOO-kit in English) is an unincorporated settlement and First Nations community located on Kyuquot Sound on northwestern Vancouver Island, British Columbia, Canada. Meaning people of Kayukw in the Nuu-chah-nulth language, it is partly the community of the Kyuquot and Cheklesahht peoples, whose band government is the Kyuquot/Cheklesahht First Nation. The site of Kayukw (qaay̓uuk̓), the original village of the Kyuquot people, is nearby in the form of Kayouk Indian Reserve No. 8, adjacent to which are Kayouk Bluff and Kayouk Creek. The original village site of the Cheklesahht people is the Checkaklis Island Indian Reserve 9 on the island of the same name in the Bunsby Islands in Checleset Bay, which is named for the people, whose name means "people of Checkaklis".
