= Doom Mountain =

Mountain in British Columbia, Canada

- Location within British Columbia
- Location on the Brooks Peninsula

Highest point
- Elevation: 787 m (2,582 ft)
- Prominence: 242 m (794 ft)
- Listing: Mountains of British Columbia
- Coordinates: 50°10′15″N 127°46′05″W

Geography
- Location: Vancouver Island, British Columbia, Canada
- District: Rupert Land District
- Parent range: Refugium Range; Vancouver Island Ranges
- Topo map: NTS 92L4 Brooks Peninsula

Doom Mountain is a mountain on the Brooks Peninsula on Vancouver Island in British Columbia, Canada. It was so named by Richard Hebda of the Royal British Columbia Museum because of the foreboding appearance of sheer cliffs, and because the mountain top was usually shrouded in cloud while the rest of the area was clear.
