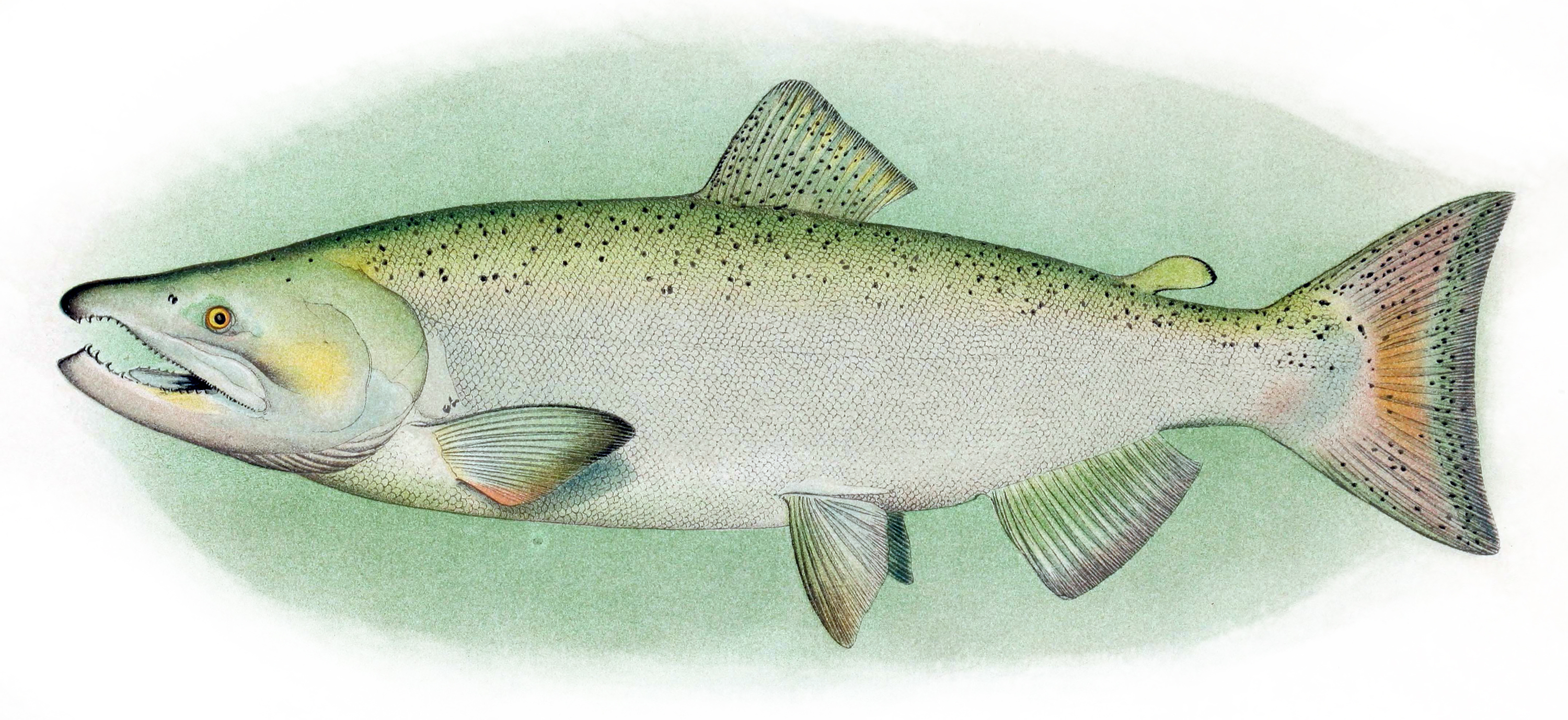

Conservation status
- Least Concern (IUCN 3.1)

- Secure (NatureServe)

Scientific classification
- Kingdom: Animalia
- Phylum: Chordata
- Class: Actinopterygii
- Division: Teleostei
- Order: Salmoniformes
- Family: Salmonidae
- Genus: Oncorhynchus
- Species: O. tshawytscha

Binomial name
- Oncorhynchus tshawytscha (Walbaum, 1792)

= Chinook salmon =

Species of fish

The Chinook salmon /ʃɪˈnʊk/ (Oncorhynchus tshawytscha) is the largest and most valuable species of Pacific salmon. Its common name is derived from the Chinookan peoples. Other vernacular names for the species include king salmon, quinnat salmon, tsumen, spring salmon, blackmouth, and tyee salmon. The scientific species name is based on the Russian common name chavycha (чавыча).

Chinook are anadromous fish native to the North Pacific Ocean and the river systems of western North America, ranging from California to Alaska, as well as Asian rivers ranging from northern Japan to the Palyavaam River in Arctic northeast Siberia. They have been introduced to other parts of the world, including New Zealand and Patagonia. Introduced Chinook salmon are thriving in Lake Michigan and Michigan's western rivers. A large Chinook is a prized and sought-after catch for a sporting angler. The flesh of the salmon is also highly valued for its nutritional content, which includes high levels of important omega-3 fatty acids. Some populations are endangered; however, many are healthy. The Chinook salmon has not been assessed for the IUCN Red List. According to NOAA, the Chinook salmon population along the California coast is declining from factors such as overfishing, loss of freshwater and estuarine habitat, hydropower development, poor ocean conditions, and hatchery practices.

== Distribution ==
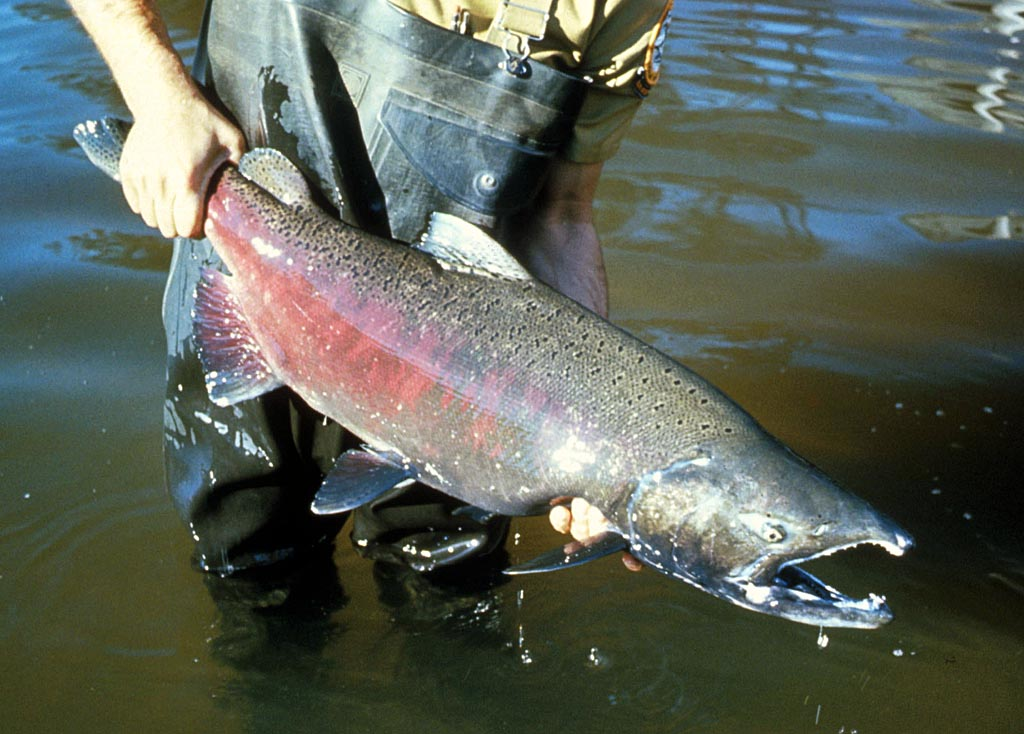
A male Chinook in his spawning phase

=== Natural range ===
Historically, the native distribution of Chinook salmon in North America ranged from the Ventura River in California in the south to Kotzebue Sound in Alaska in the north. Recent studies have shown that Chinook salmon are historically native to the Guadalupe River watershed in California, the southernmost major metropolitan area hosting salmon runs in the United States. Populations have disappeared from large areas where they once flourished, however, or shrunk by as much as 40 percent. In some regions, their inland range has been cut off, mainly by dams and habitat alterations: in Southern California, in some areas east of the Coast Ranges of California and Oregon, and in large areas in the Snake River and upper Columbia River drainage basins. In certain areas such as California's Sacramento–San Joaquin River Delta, it was revealed that extremely low numbers of juvenile Chinook salmon (less than 1%) were surviving.

In the western Pacific, the distribution ranges from northern Japan (Hokkaido) in the south to the Arctic Ocean as far as the East Siberian Sea and Palyavaam River in the north. Nevertheless, they are consistently present and the distribution is well known only in Kamchatka. Elsewhere, information is scarce, but they have a patchy presence in the Anadyr River basin and parts of the Chukchi Peninsula. Also, in parts of the northern Magadan Oblast near the Shelikhov Gulf and Penzhina Bay, stocks might persist but remain poorly studied.

=== Introduced populations ===
In 1967, the Michigan Department of Natural Resources introduced Chinook into Lake Michigan and Lake Huron to control the alewife, an invasive species of nuisance fish from the Atlantic Ocean. In the 1960s, alewives constituted 90% of the biota in these lakes. Coho salmon had been introduced the year before, and the program was successful. Chinook and Coho salmon thrived on the alewives and spawned in the lakes' tributaries. After this success, Chinook were introduced into the other Great Lakes, where sport fishermen prize them for their aggressive behaviour on the hook. Despite a consistent program of release, the chinook has not established itself as a natively reproducing species in the Great Lakes. While limited natural reproduction occurs in the wild, the continued presence of the fish is depended on yearly stocking.

The species has also established itself in Patagonian waters in South America, where both introduced and escaped hatchery fish have colonized rivers and established stable spawning runs. Chinook salmon have been found spawning in headwater reaches of the Rio Santa Cruz, apparently having migrated over 1,000 km (620 mi) from the ocean. The population is thought to be derived from a single stocking of juveniles in the lower river around 1930.

Sporadic efforts to introduce the fish to New Zealand waters in the late 19th century were largely failures and led to no evident establishments. Initially ova were imported from the Baird hatchery of the McCloud River in California. Further efforts in the early 20th century were more successful and subsequently led to the establishment of spawning runs in the rivers of Canterbury and North Otago: Rangitata River, the Ōpihi River, the Ashburton River, the Rakaia River, the Waimakariri River, the Hurunui River, and the Waiau Uwha River. The success of the latter introductions is thought to be partly attributable to the use of ova from autumn-run populations as opposed to ova from spring-run populations used in the first attempts. Whilst other salmon have also been introduced into New Zealand, only Chinook salmon (or king salmon as it is known locally in New Zealand) have established sizeable pelagic runs.

== Description ==
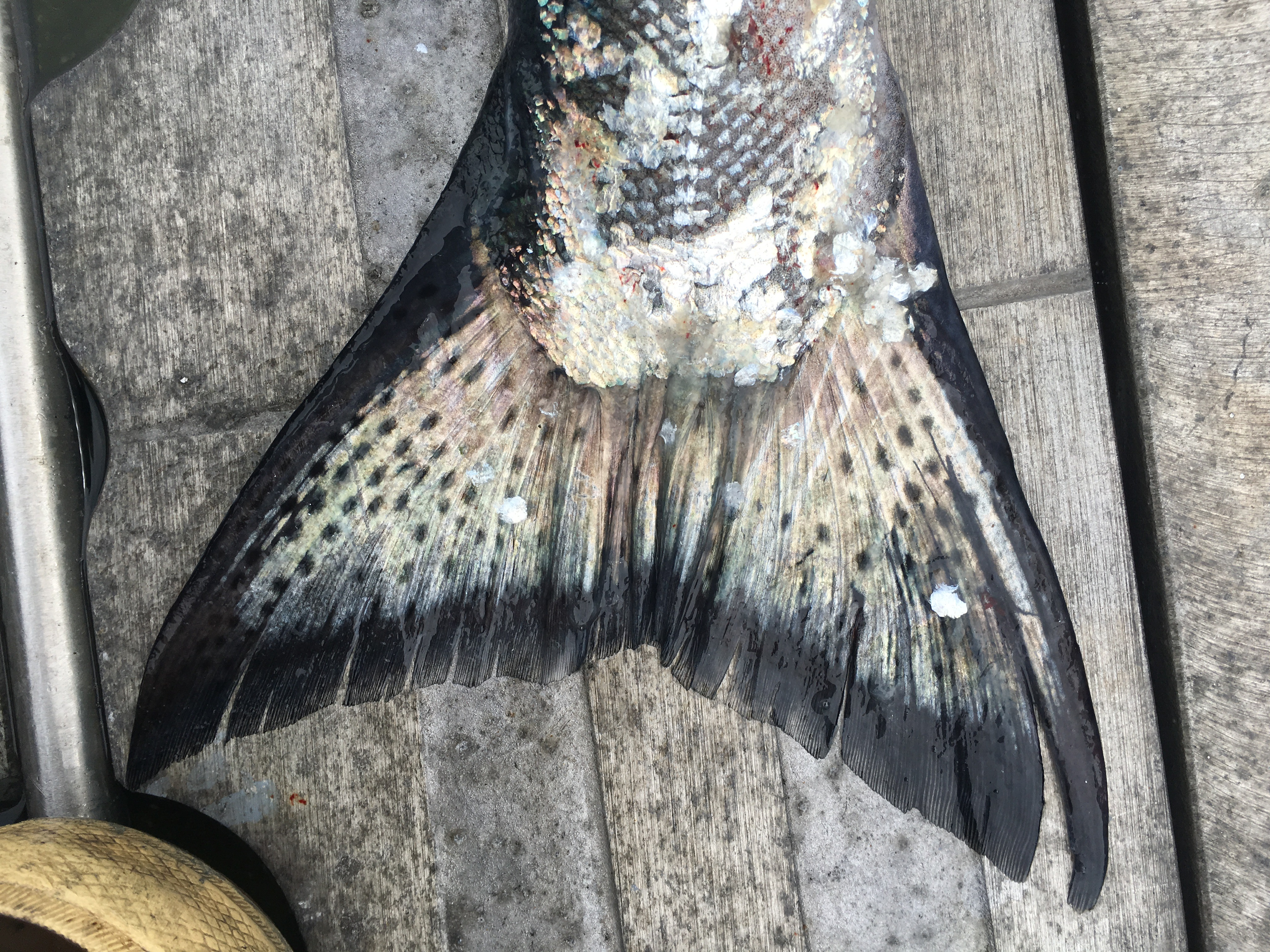
Chinook salmon tail, showing distinctive combination of black spots and silver

The Chinook is blue-green, red, or purple on the back and on the top of the head, with silvery sides and white ventral surfaces. It has black spots on its tail and the upper half of its body. Although spots are seen on the tail in pink salmon and silver on the tail in coho and chum salmon, Chinook are unique among the Pacific salmon in combining black spots and silver on the tail. Another distinctive feature is a black gum line that is present in both salt and fresh water. Adult fish typically range in size from 60 to 90 cm (24 to 36 in), but may be up to 150 cm (58 in) in length; they average 4.5 to 22.7 kg (10 to 50 lb), but may reach 59 kg (130 lb). Those termed Tyee typically must be more than 14 kg (30 lb).The meat can be either pink or white, depending on what the salmon have been feeding on.

Chinook salmon are the largest of the Pacific salmon. In the Kenai River of Alaska, mature Chinook averaged 16.8 kg (37 lb 1 oz). The current sport-caught world record, 44.1 kg (97 1/4 lb), was caught on May 17, 1985, in the Kenai River. The commercial catch world record is 57 kg (126 lb) caught near Rivers Inlet, British Columbia, in the late 1970s.

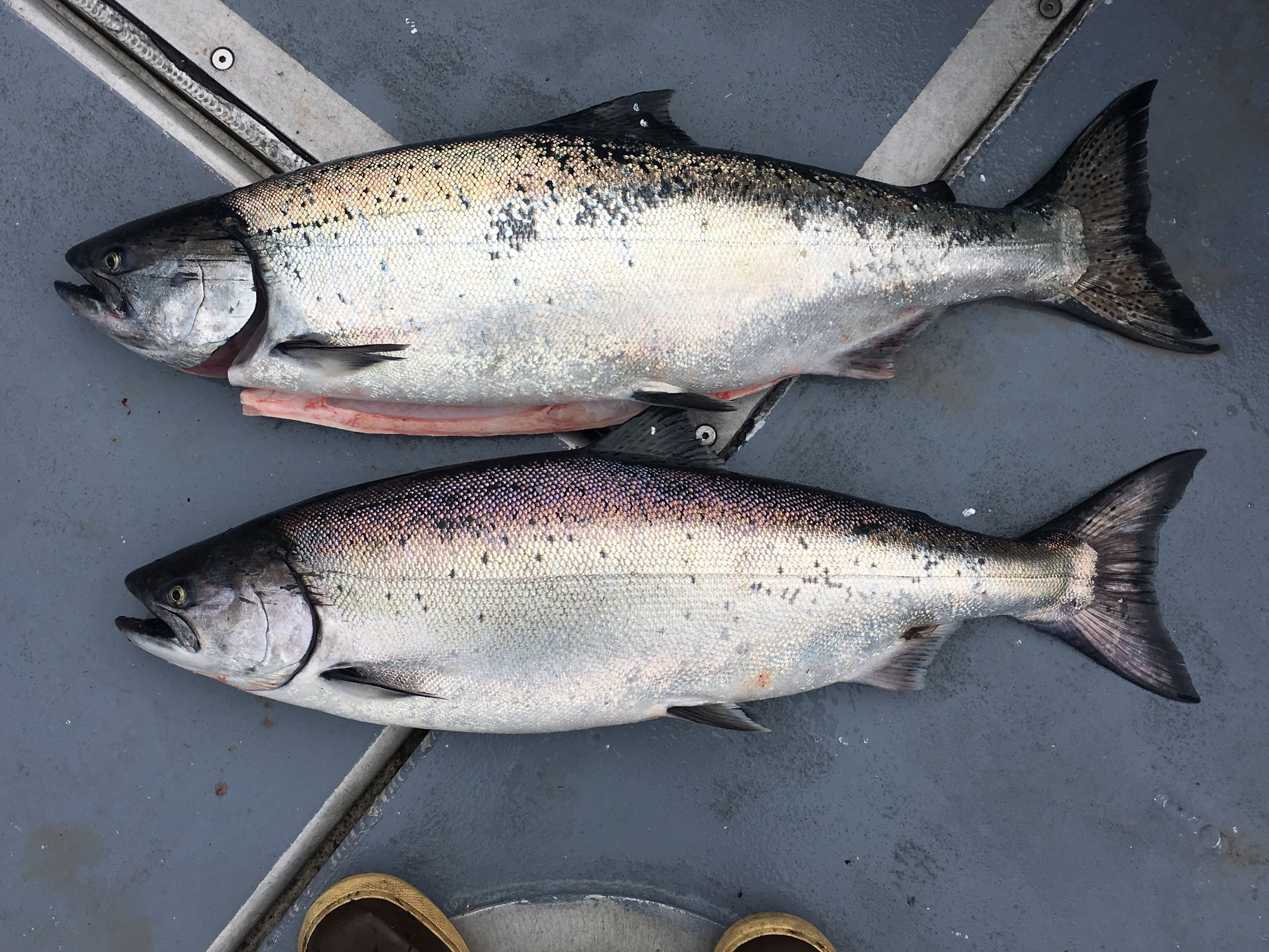
Ocean-caught Chinook salmon

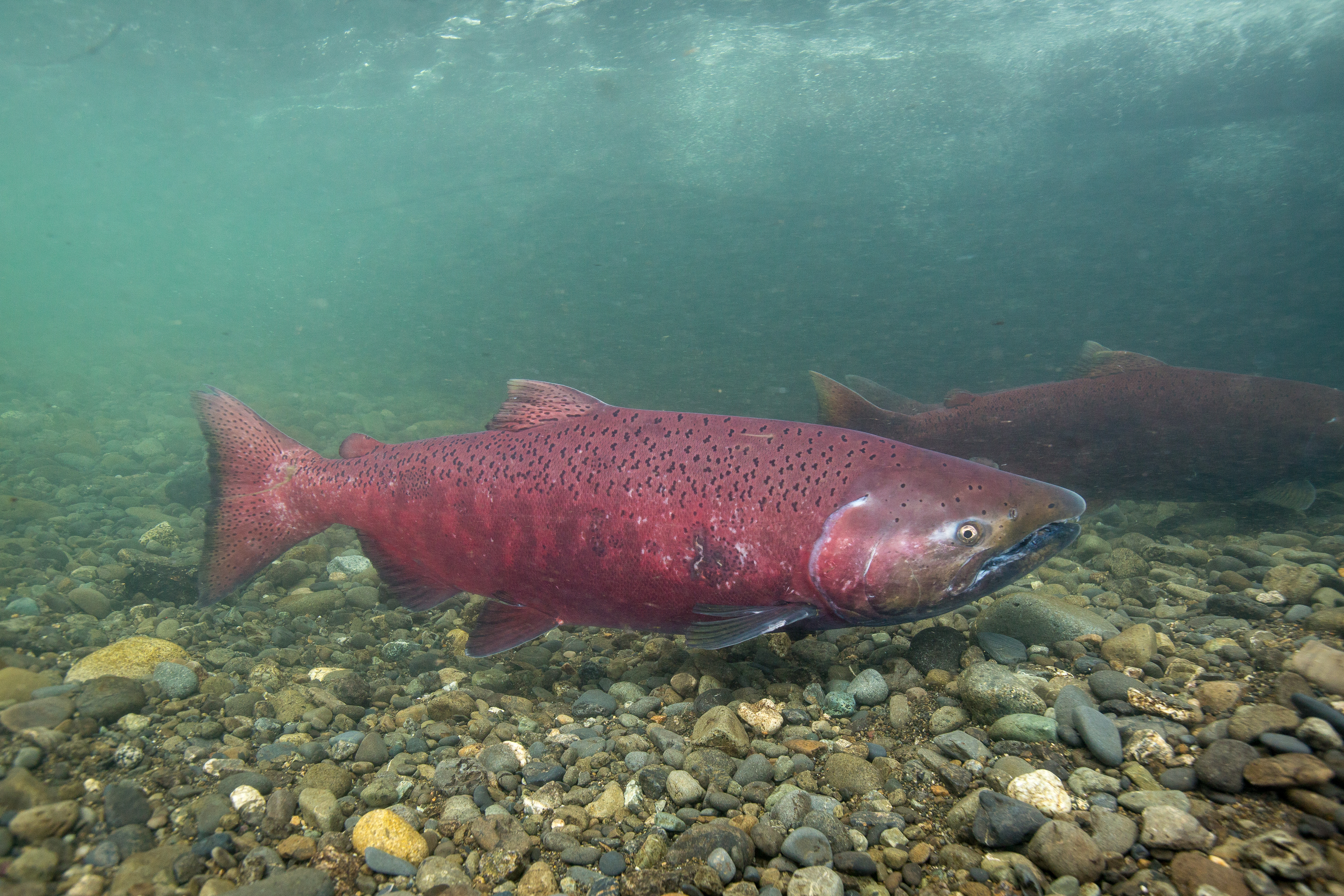
Breeding colours, Russian River (Alaska)

== Life cycle ==
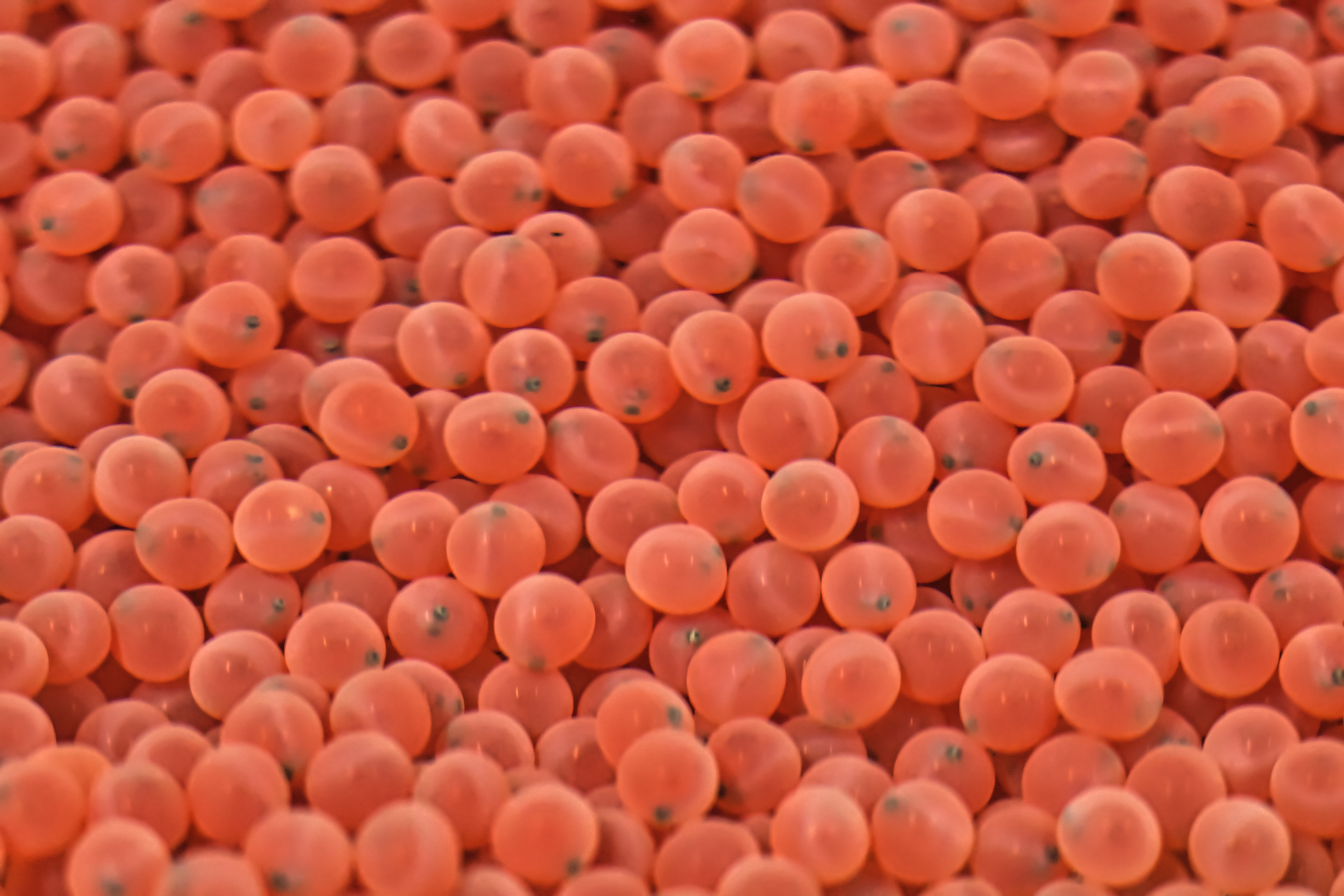
Fertilized Chinook eggs

Chinook, like many other species of salmon, are considered euryhaline, and thus live in both saltwater and freshwater environments throughout their life. Once hatched, salmon spend one to eight years in the ocean (averaging from three to four years) before returning to their home rivers to spawn. The salmon undergo radical morphological changes as they prepare for the spawning event ahead. Salmon lose the silvery blue they had as ocean fish, and their color darkens, sometimes with a radical change in hue. Salmon are sexually dimorphic, and the male salmon develop canine-like teeth, and their jaws develop a pronounced curve or hook called a "kype". Studies have shown that larger and more dominant male salmon have a reproductive advantage as female Chinook are often more aggressive toward smaller males.

Chinook spawn in larger and deeper waters than other salmon species and can be found on the spawning redds (nests) from September to December. The female salmon may lay her eggs in four to five nesting pockets within a redd. After laying eggs, females guard the redd from four to 25 days before dying, while males seek additional mates. Chinook eggs hatch 90 to 150 days after deposition, depending upon water temperature. Egg deposits are timed to ensure the young salmon fry emerge during an appropriate season for survival and growth. Fry and parr (young fish) usually stay in fresh water for 12 to 18 months before traveling downstream to estuaries, where they remain as smolts for several months. Some Chinook return to fresh water one or two years earlier than their counterparts and are referred to as "jack" salmon. "Jack" salmon are typically less than 60 cm (24 in) long but are sexually mature.

Chinook salmon (male)

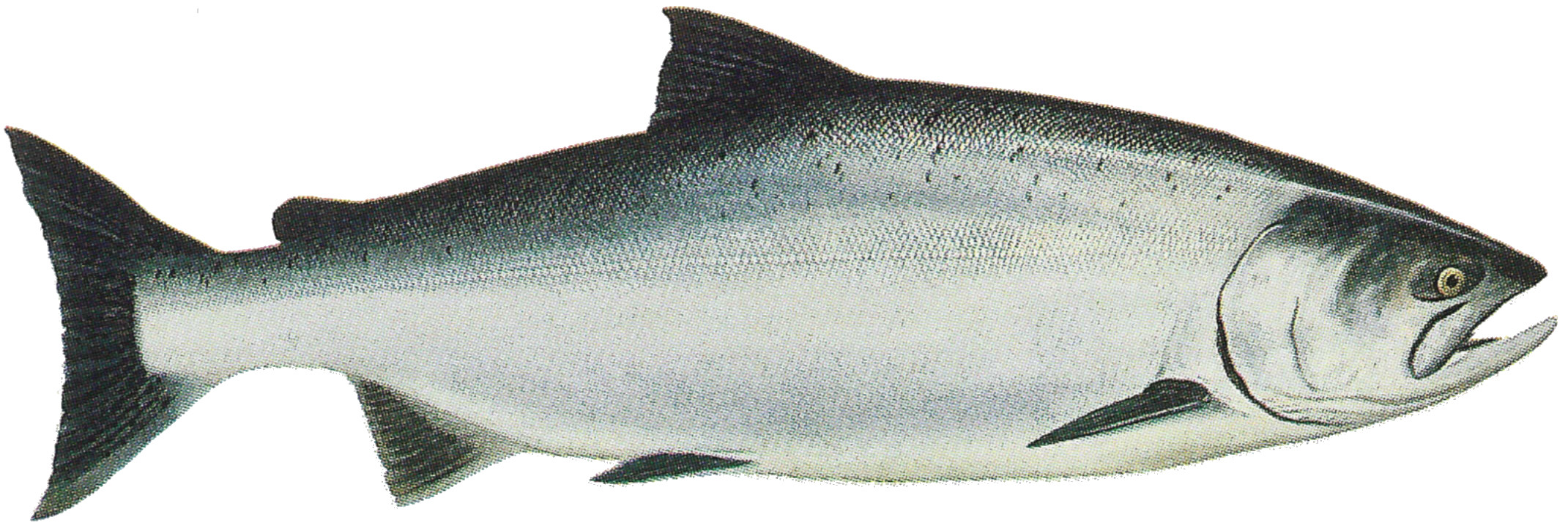
Ocean-phase

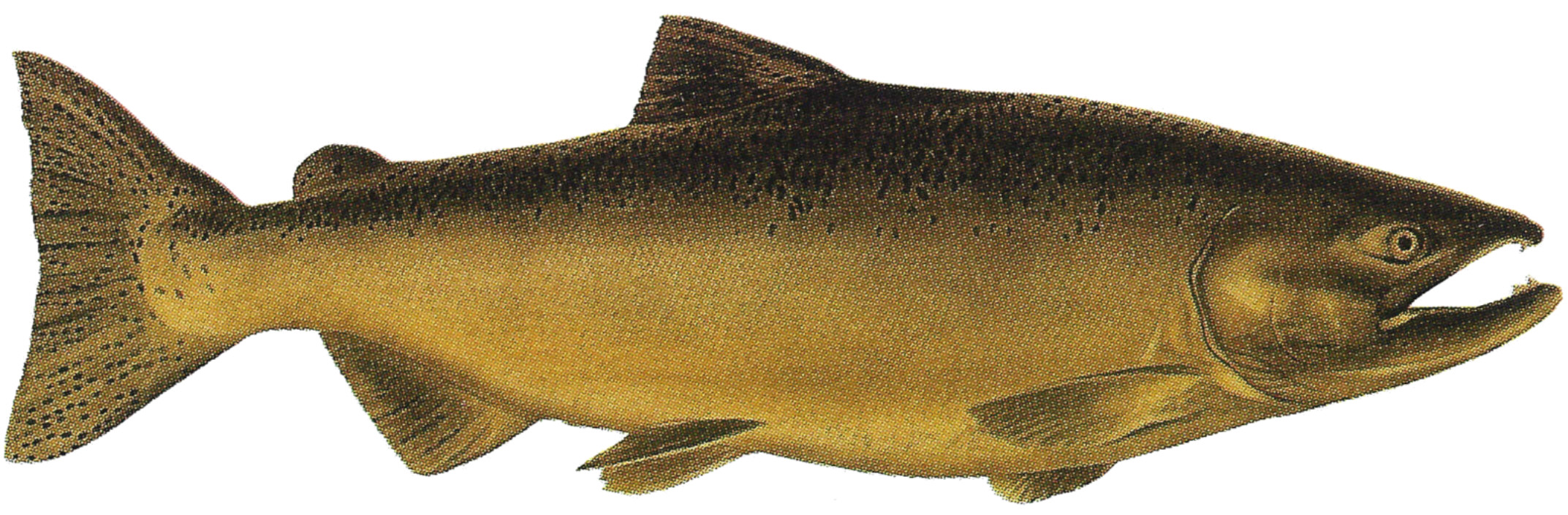
Spawning phase, showing more curved jaws and change in colour

The Yukon River has the longest freshwater migration route of any salmon, over 3,000 km (1,900 mi) from its mouth in the Bering Sea to spawning grounds upstream of Whitehorse, Yukon. Since Chinook rely on fat reserves for energy upon re-entering fresh water, commercial fish caught here are highly prized for their unusually high levels of heart-healthy omega-3 fatty acids. However, the high costs of harvest and transport from this rural area limits its affordability. The highest elevation Chinook spawn is in the Middle Fork and Upper Salmon River in Idaho. These fish travel over 2,100 m (7,000 ft) in elevation, and over 1,400 km (900 mi), in their migration through eight dams and reservoirs on the Columbia and Lower Snake Rivers.

Chinook eat amphipods and other crustaceans and insects while young, and primarily other fish when older. Young salmon feed in streambeds for a short period until they are strong enough to journey out to the ocean and acquire more food. Chinook juveniles divide into two types: ocean-type and stream-type. Ocean-type Chinook migrate to salt water in their first year. Stream-type salmon spend one full year in fresh water before migrating to the ocean. After a few years in the ocean, adult salmon, then large enough to escape most predators, return to their natal streambeds to mate. Chinook can have extended lifespans, in which some fish spend one to five years in the ocean, reaching age eight. More northerly populations tend to have longer lives.

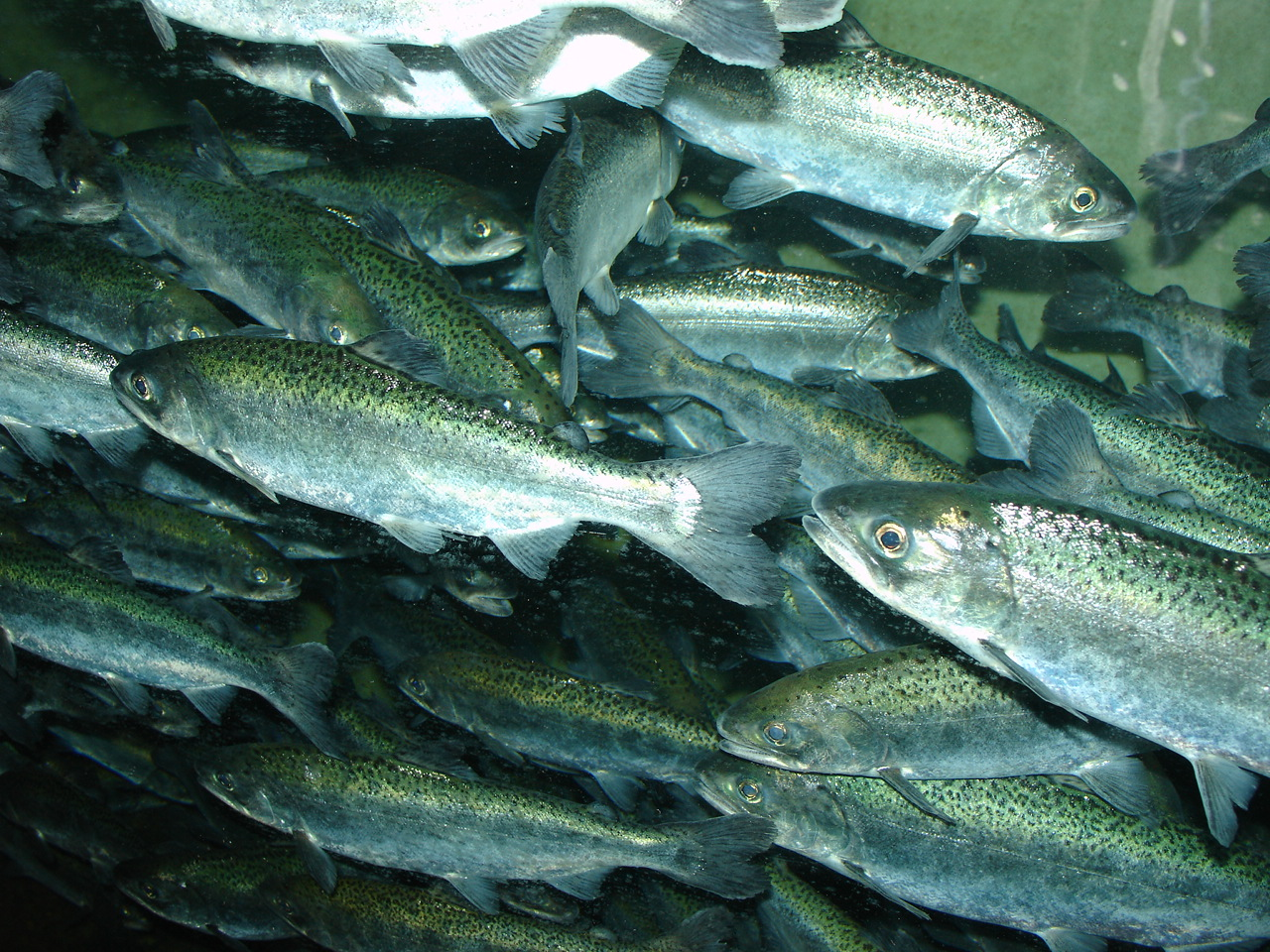
Chinook salmon school

Salmon need suitable spawning habitat. Clean, cool, oxygenated, sediment-free fresh water is essential for egg development. Chinook use larger sediment (gravel) sizes for spawning than other Pacific salmon. Riparian vegetation and woody debris help juvenile salmon by providing cover and maintaining low water temperatures.

Chinook also need healthy ocean habitats. Juvenile salmon grow in clean, productive estuarine environments and gain the energy for migration. Later, they change physiologically to live in salt water. They rely on eelgrass and seaweeds for camouflage (protection from predators), shelter, and foraging habitat as they make their way to the open ocean. Adult fish need a rich, open ocean habitat to acquire the strength needed to travel back upstream, escape predators, and reproduce before dying. In his book King of Fish, David Montgomery writes, "The reserves of fish at sea are important to restocking rivers disturbed by natural catastrophes." Thus, it is vitally important for the fish to reach the oceans to grow into healthy adult fish to sustain the species without being impeded by man-made structures such as dams.

The bodies of water for salmon habitat must be clean and oxygenated. One sign of high productivity and growth rate in the oceans is the level of algae. Increased algal levels lead to higher levels of carbon dioxide in the water, which transfers into living organisms, fostering underwater plants and small organisms, which salmon eat. Algae can filter high levels of toxins and pollutants. Thus, it is essential for algae and other water-filtering agents not to be destroyed in the oceans because they contribute to the well-being of the food chain.

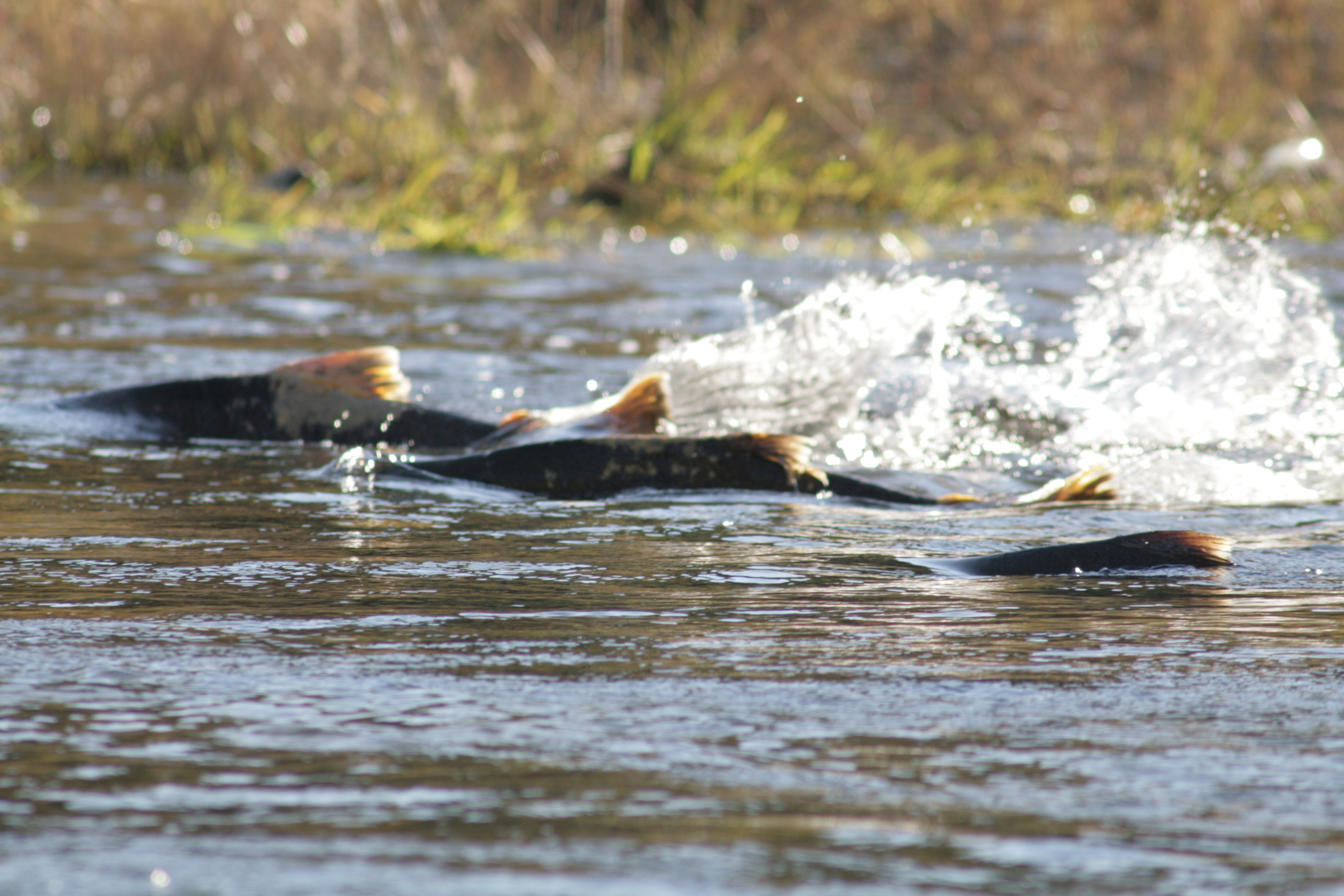
Chinook salmon moving upstream

With some populations endangered, precautions are necessary to prevent overfishing and habitat destruction, including appropriate management of hydroelectric and irrigation projects. If too few fish remain because of fishing and land management practices, salmon have more difficulty reproducing. When one of these factors is compromised, affected stock can decline. One Seattle Times article states, "Pacific salmon have disappeared from 40 percent of their historic range outside Alaska," and concludes it is imperative for people to realize the needs of salmon and try not to contribute to destructive practices that harm salmon runs.

In the Pacific Northwest, the summer runs of especially large Chinook once common (before dams and overfishing led to declines) were known as June hogs.

A Chinook's birthplace and later evolution can be tracked by looking at its otolith (ear) bone. The bone can record the chemical composition of the water the fish had lived in, just as a tree's growth rings provide hints about dry and wet years. The bone is built with the chemical signature of the environment that hosted the fish. Researchers were able to tell where different individuals of Chinook were born and lived in the first year of their lives. Testing was done by measuring the strontium in the bones. Strontium can accurately show researchers the exact location and time of a fish swimming in a river.

== Fishing industry ==
Capture (blue) and aquaculture (green) production of Chinook salmon (Oncorhynchus tshawytscha) in thousand tonnes from 1950 to 2022, as reported by the FAO

=== Wild capture ===
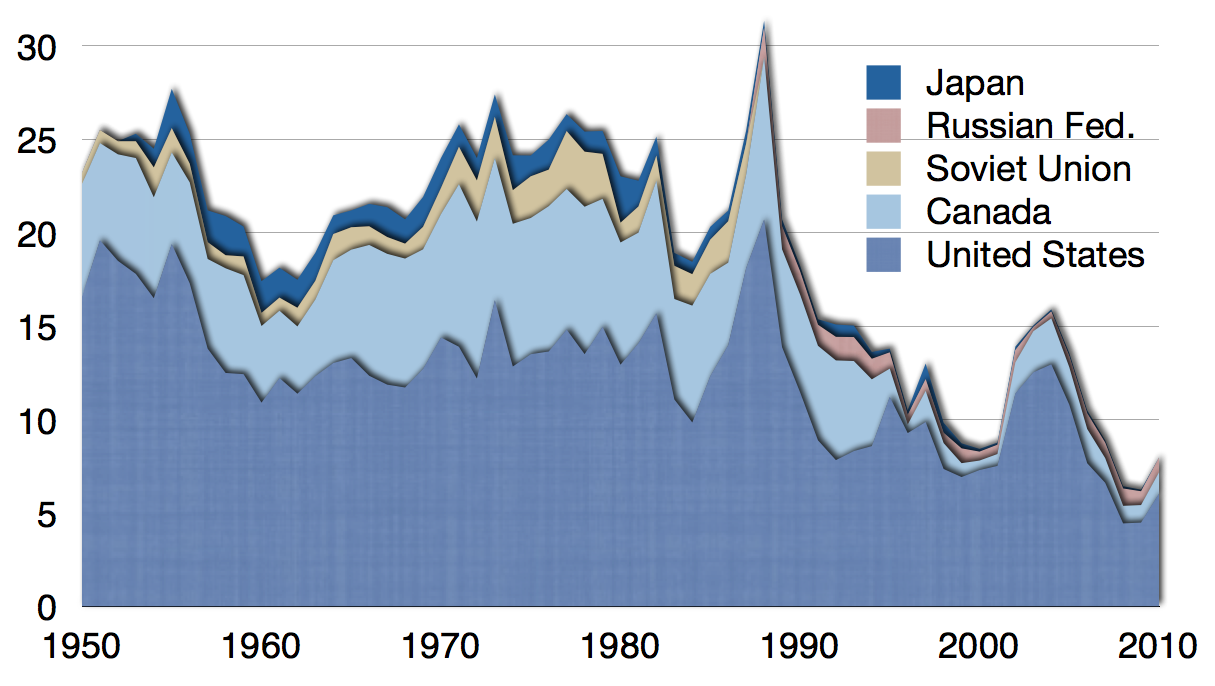
Wild capture in thousand tonnes as reported by the FAO, 1950–2010

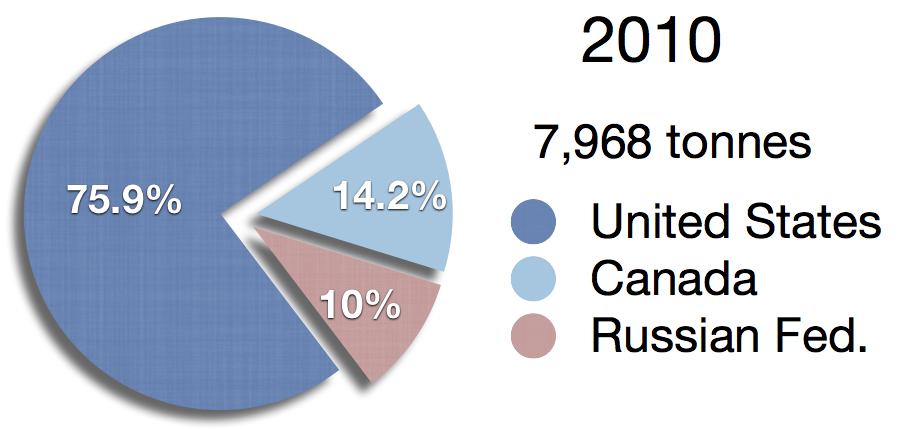
Wild capture as reported by the FAO for 2010

The total North Pacific fisheries harvest of the Chinook salmon in 2010 was some 1.4 million fish, corresponding to 7,000 tonnes; 1.1 million of the fish were captured in the United States, and others were divided between Canada and Russia. The share of Chinook salmon from the total commercial Pacific salmon harvest was less than 1% by weight and only about 0.3% of the number of fish. The trend has been down in the captures compared to the period before 1990, when the total harvest had been around 25,000 tonnes. Global production has, however, remained at a stable level because of increased aquaculture.

=== Aquaculture ===
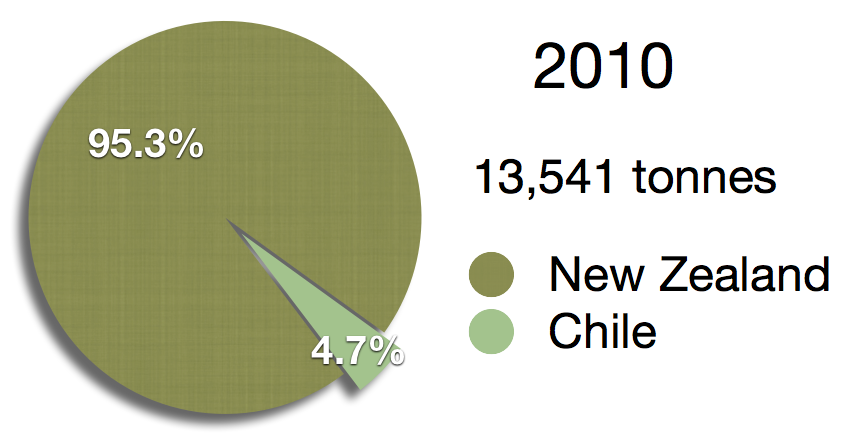
Aquaculture production as reported by the FAO for 2010

The world's largest producer and market supplier of Chinook salmon is New Zealand. In 2009, New Zealand exported 5,088 tonnes (5,609 short tons) of Chinook salmon, marketed as king salmon, equating to a value of NZ$61 million in export earnings. For the year ended March 2011, this amount had increased to NZ$85 million. New Zealand accounts for about half of the global production of Chinook salmon, and about half of New Zealand's production is exported. Japan is New Zealand's largest export market, with stock also being supplied to other countries of the Pacific Rim, including Australia.

Farming of the species in New Zealand began in the 1970s when hatcheries were initially set up to enhance and support wild fish stocks, with the first commercial operations starting in 1976. After some opposition against their establishment by societal groups, including anglers, the first sea cage farm was established in 1983 at Big Glory Bay in Stewart Island by British Petroleum NZ Ltd. Today, the salmon are hatched in land-based hatcheries (several of which exist) and transferred to sea cages or freshwater farms, where they are grown out to the harvestable size of 3–4 kilograms (7–9 pounds). The broodstock for the farms is usually selected from existing farm stock or sometimes sourced from wild populations. Eggs and milt are stripped manually from sexually mature salmon and incubated under conditions replicating the streams and rivers where the salmon would spawn naturally (at around 10–12 °C or 50–54 °F). After hatching, the baby salmon are typically grown to the smolt stage (around six months of age) before they are transferred to the sea cages or ponds. Most sea cage farming occurs in the Marlborough Sounds, Stewart Island, and Akaroa Harbour, while freshwater operations in Canterbury, Otago, and Tasman use ponds, raceways, and hydro canals for grow-out operations. Low stocking densities, ranging between less than 1 kg/m^{3} and around 25 kg/m^{3} (depending on the life stage of the salmon), and the absence of disease in the fish mean New Zealand farmers do not need to use antibiotics or vaccines to maintain the health of their salmon stocks. The salmon are fed food pellets of fish meal specially formulated for Chinook salmon (typical proportions of the feed are: 45% protein, 22% fat, and 14% carbohydrate plus ash and water) that contain no steroids or other growth enhancers.

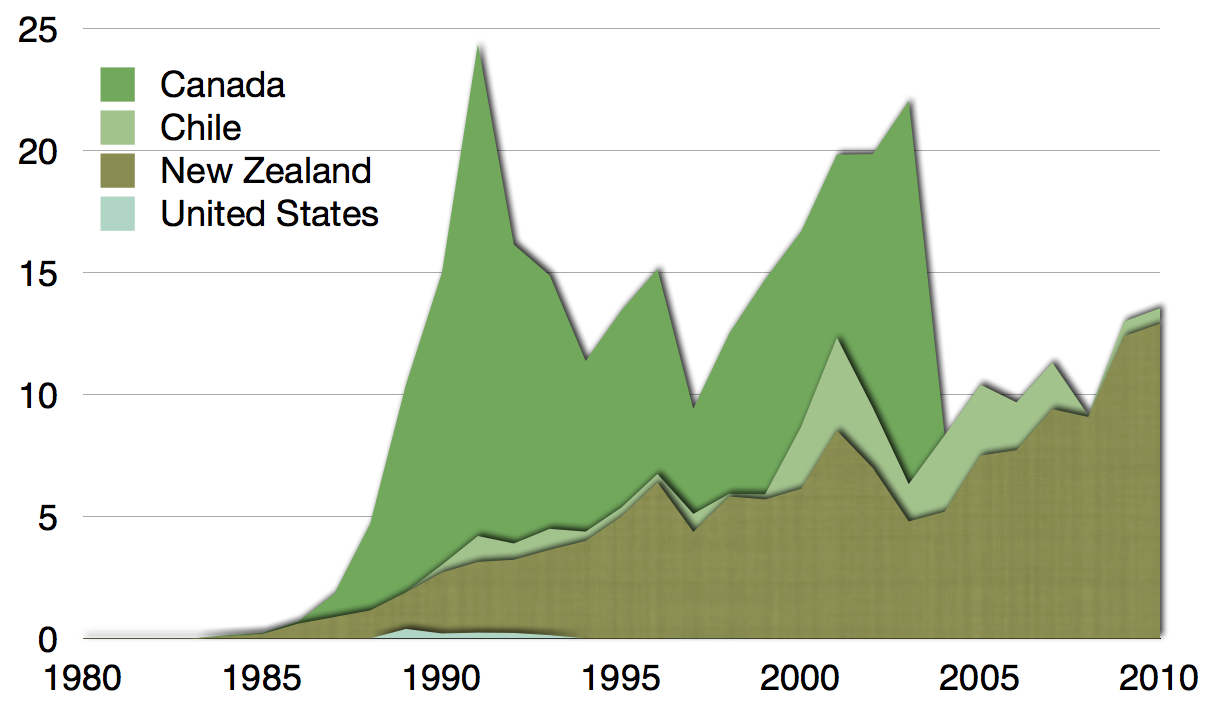
Aquaculture production in thousand tonnes as reported by the FAO, 1980–2010

Regulations and monitoring programmes ensure salmon are farmed in a sustainable manner. The planning and approval process for new salmon farms in New Zealand considers the farm's potential environmental effects, its effects on fishing activities (if it is a marine farm), and any possible cultural and social effects. In the interest of fish welfare, a number of New Zealand salmon farming operations anaesthetise salmon before slaughter using Aqui-S™, an organically based anaesthetic developed in New Zealand that is safe for use in food and that has been favourably reported on by the British Humane Slaughter Association. In recognition of the sustainable, environmentally conscious practices, the New Zealand salmon farming industry has been acknowledged as the world's greenest by the Global Aquaculture Performance Index.

Chile is the only country other than New Zealand currently producing significant quantities of farmed Chinook salmon. The United States has not produced farmed Chinook in commercial quantities since 1994. In Canada, most commercial Chinook salmon farming ceased by 2009.

=== Management ===
==== Pacific coast ====
Fisheries in the U.S. and Canada are limited by impacts to weak and endangered salmon runs. Nine populations of Chinook salmon are listed under the U.S. Endangered Species Act (ESA) as either threatened or endangered. In the Snake River, Spring/Summer Chinook and Fall Chinook are ESA listed as Threatened. The fall and late-fall runs in the Central Valley population in California is a U.S. National Marine Fisheries Service (NMFS) species of concern.

The Center for Biological Diversity and Pacific Rivers, a conservation advocacy group, are currently petitioning for an ESA listing on Chinook in several river basins in Washington state, including the Chehalis, Quinault, Queets, Hoh and Quillayute. The petition, filed in 2023, focuses on spring-run Chinook, the region's most vulnerable salmon population.

In April 2008, commercial fisheries in both Oregon and California were closed in response to the low count of Chinook salmon present because of the collapse of the Sacramento River run, one of the biggest south of the Columbia. In April 2009, California again canceled the season. The Pacific Fishery Management Council's goal for the Sacramento River run is an escapement total (fish that return to freshwater spawn areas and hatcheries) of 122,000–180,000 fish. The 2007 escapement was estimated at 88,000, and the 2008 estimate was 66,000 fish. Scientists from universities and federal, state, and tribal agencies concluded the 2004 and 2005 broods were harmed by poor ocean conditions in 2005 and 2006, in addition to "a long-term, steady degradation of the freshwater and estuarine environment." Such conditions included weak upwelling, warm sea surface temperatures, and low densities of food.

In Oregon, the 2010 spring Chinook run was forecast to increase by up to 150% over 2009 populations, growing from 200,000 to over 500,000, making this the largest run in recorded history. Lower temperatures in 2008 North Pacific waters brought in fatter plankton, which, along with greater outflows of Columbia River water, fed the resurgent populations. The Oregon Department of Fish and Wildlife estimated 80% were hatchery-born. Chinook runs in other habitats have not recovered proportionately.

In April 2016, Coleman National Fish Hatchery outside of Red Bluff, California, released 12 million juvenile Chinook salmon, with many salmon being tagged for monitoring. The release was done in hopes of helping restore the salmon population of Battle Creek.

In June 2021, the California State Water Resources Control Board approved a plan by the United States Bureau of Reclamation to release water from Lake Shasta for irrigation use, which "significantly" increased the risk of extinction of winter-run Chinook in the Sacramento River.

In an effort to restore the fish habitat of the Klamath River, four dams on the Klamath (Iron Gate Dam, Copco No 2 Dam, Copco No 1 Dam, and John C. Boyle Dam) were removed by the end of 2024. Klamath River Renewal Corporation (KRRC), who is in charge of the operation, cited the adverse effects of the dams on fish survivability and the blockage of fish habitat as major reasons for removal. In June 2023, Copco 2 Dam was torn down. In addition to dam removal, KRRC is also conducting efforts to revegetate certain areas in the watershed with trees and native grasses. The Oregon Department of Fish and Wildlife(ODFW), in cooperation with members of the Klamath and Yurok tribes, also finalized a two-phase plan to re-establish wild Chinook and other anadromous fishes in the Upper Klamath Basin. As of December 2022, the plan is in its monitoring phase, in which ODFW are studying 10,000 hatchery-born spring-run Chinook released in certain tributaries of Upper Klamath Lake.

==== Lake Michigan ====
Introduced Chinook salmon in Lake Michigan are sought after by tourists enjoying chartered fishing trips. A 2016 survey of Wisconsin anglers found they would, on average, pay $140 for a trip to catch Chinook salmon, $90 for lake trout, and $180 for walleye. Should the Chinook salmon fishery collapse and be replaced with a native lake trout fishery, the economic value would decrease by 80%.

== Recent data ==
Since the later 1970s, the size and age range of Chinook salmon have been declining according to studies along the northwest Pacific coast from Alaska to California for the years of 1977 to 2015 which examined about 1.5 million Chinook salmon. Ocean-5 Chinook (which means the fish has spent five years in the ocean) have declined from being up to 3–5% of the population to being almost none. Ocean-4 chinook are also seeing a rapid decline in their population. This means that Chinook are not living as long as they used to. This trend has mostly been seen in Alaska, but also Oregon and Washington.

New trends have also been seen regarding the size of Ocean-1, 2, 3, 4, and 5 from 1975 to 2015. The size of Chinook who have spent one and two years in the ocean has been rising, while the size of Chinook of three to five years has been declining. The size increase was seen mainly in hatchery fish, not wild, and hatchery fish were often larger than wild, but the decrease was seen in both types of populations. Factors have been discovered that have influenced the size of the Chinook. They include, but are not limited to, the years they spent in fresh water before migrating to the ocean, the time of year they were caught, which season run they participated in, and where they were caught. However, what is causing these negative trends is still not fully known or researched. Some possibilities can be climate change, pollution, and fishing practices.

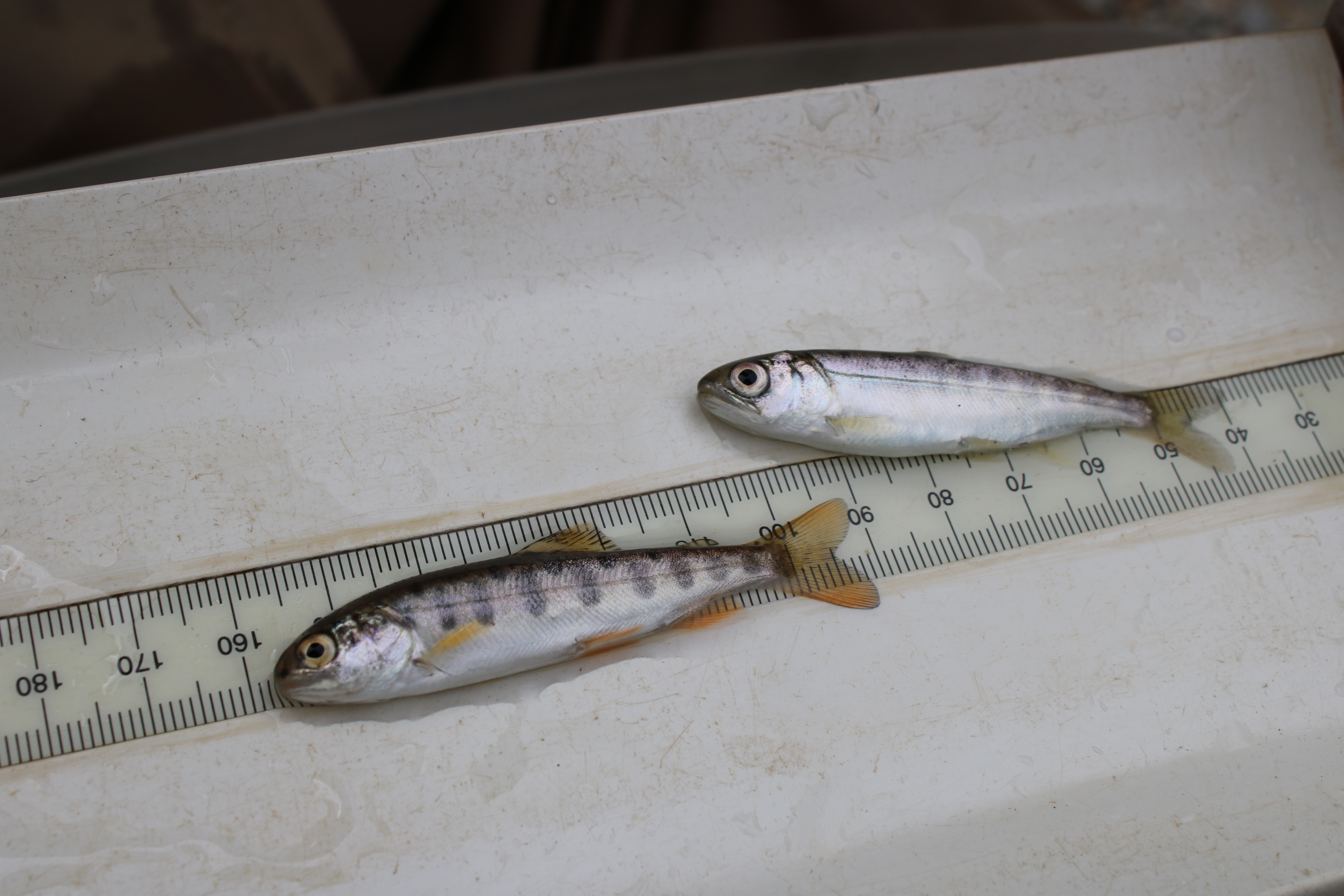
Juvenile Chinook salmon being measured for research

In California specifically, Chinook populations in the rivers have been declining. Chinook that are migratory are already more vulnerable, and the California drought made them even more vulnerable. A study was done specifically on the California Delta over three years, and it was discovered that the Chinook salmon had a low survival rate for different reasons, and as a result, the Chinook salmon population here has been on a decline. Some of the factors affecting the populations include the route used during migration, drought conditions, the amount of snowmelt, and infrastructure that affects the flow of water (such as dams and levees). Each of these factors has significantly impacted Chinook survival rates, as most have made it more challenging for Chinook to travel from their spawning grounds to the ocean and back. The fluctuation of water depth as well as temperature have made this more challenging, and as a result, Chinook populations are declining. Which rivers or streams the Chinook are in highly impacts their survival rates, as some, like the Chinook in the Fraser River, only have a 30% survival rate. More studies and actions are needed for there to be an impact on the survival rates of the Chinook. Due to many of these reasons, the National Wildlife Federation has listed Chinook populations as endangered or threatened.

== Cultural aspects ==
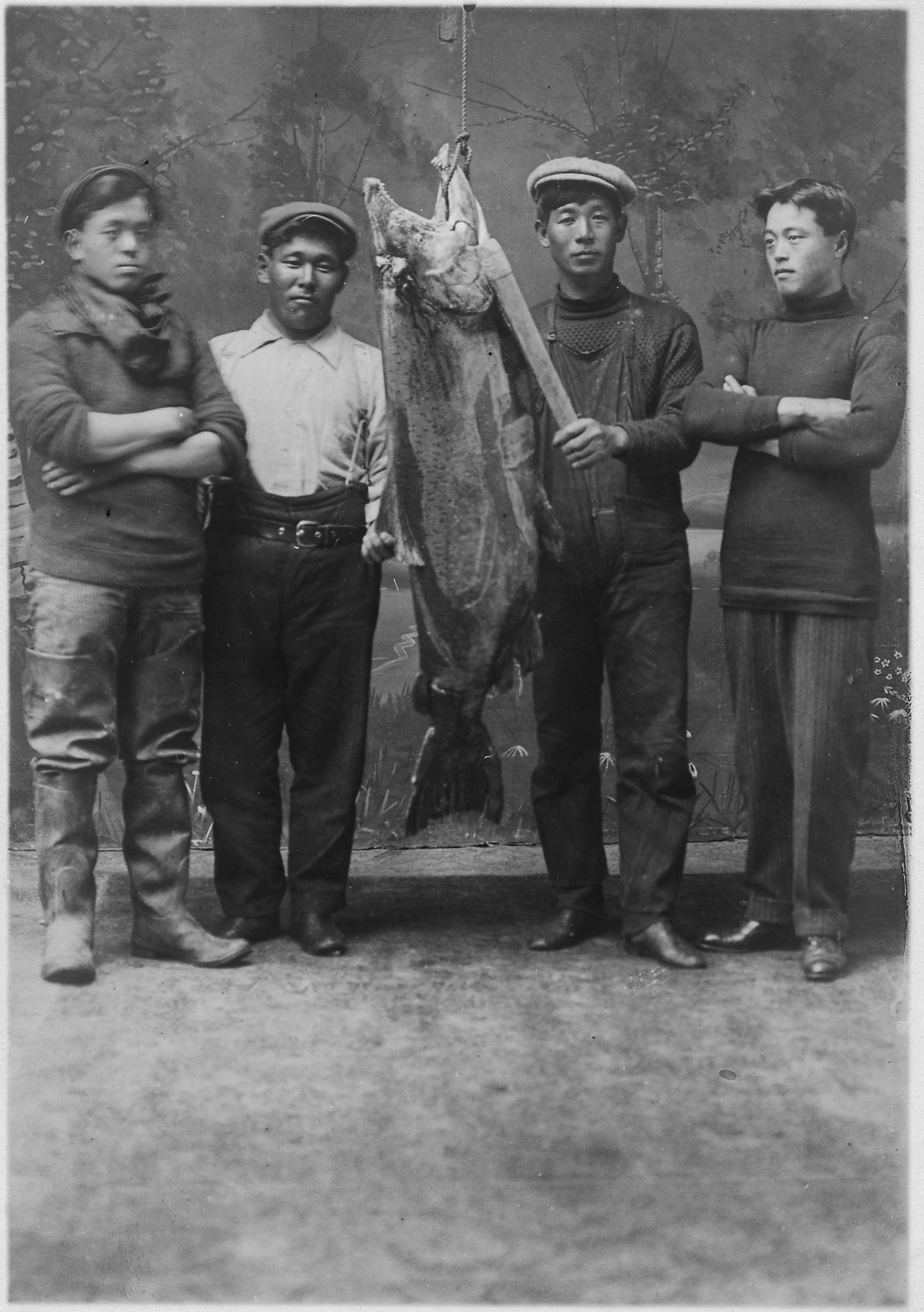
Cannery workers from Metlakatla (Note: This may be either Metlakatla, Alaska, or Metlakatla, British Columbia. The uncredited photograph is from the collection of Henry Wellcome, which includes images from both communities.) with a large chinook

The Chinook salmon is spiritually and culturally prized among certain First Nations peoples. For tribes on the Northwest coast, salmon are an important part of their culture for spiritual reasons and food. Many celebrate the first spring Chinook caught each year with "first-salmon ceremonies." While salmon fishing, in general, remains economically important for many tribal communities, the Chinook harvest is typically the most valuable. The relationship to salmon for the tribes in this area is similar to how other tribes relied more on buffalo for food, as they have many legends and spiritual ties to them.

Chinook salmon were described and enthusiastically eaten by the Lewis and Clark Expedition. Lewis wrote that, when fresh, they tasted better than any other fish he had ever eaten. They did not particularly like dried or "pounded" salmon. Lewis and Clark knew about Pacific salmon but had never seen one. The Western world had known about Pacific salmon since the late 18th century. Maritime fur traders and explorers, such as George Vancouver, frequently acquired salmon by trade with the indigenous people of the Northwest coast. Lewis and Clark first encountered Chinook salmon as a gift from Chief Cameahwait, on August 13, 1805, near Lemhi Pass. Tasting it convinced Lewis they had crossed the continental divide.

In Oregon, many Native American tribes, including the Klamath tribes and the Yurok Tribe, have lived along the Klamath river, and the Chinook salmon have been an important part of their lives, spiritually and physically. An Indian legend of a tribe on the Klamath river describes how the construction of the dam has hurt the fish population and that the impact on them has gone unnoticed, and the destruction of the dam is what has brought back their food supply and made them happy again. The Klamath tribe had a similar legend that has illustrated the importance of not messing up the Chinook salmon migration. The legend described three Skookums which can be related to the three dams on the Klamath river in California. It has been known that the creation of dams has negatively impacted the lives of many Native American Indians by disrupting their food supply and the flow of water. The impact on the salmon migration has been seen by not only tribal members but others as well, and as a result, progress is slowly being made to help restore the salmon habitats along the river. Many tribes, including the Hoopa Valley Tribe, Karuk Tribe, Yurok Tribe, and the Shasta Indian Nation, voiced support for the removal of dams on the Klamath River. Representatives of the Shasta Indian Nation claimed that the construction of Copco No 1 Dam caused the submerging of sites significant to them, including burial grounds. Un-Dam the Klamath, supported by the Karuk and Yurok Tribes, is one of the major campaigns advocating for the Klamath dam removals, which started deconstruction in 2023.

Other tribes, including the Nuxalk, Kwakiutl, and Kyuquot, relied primarily on Chinook to eat. Known as the "king salmon" in Alaska for its large size and flavorful flesh, the Chinook is the state fish of this state, and of Oregon.
