= Kyuquot Sound =

Sound in British Columbia, Canada

Coordinates: 50°03′00″N 127°15′00″W

Kyuquot Sound is a complex of coastal inlets, bays and islands on northwestern Vancouver Island in the Canadian province of British Columbia.

The sound is named after the Kyuquot people, who are of the Nuu-chah-nulth peoples by culture and language (incorrectly known as "Nootka"). Their local government, based at Kyuquot, is the Kyuquot/Cheklesahht First Nation which is a member of the Nuu-chah-nulth Tribal Council.

== Geography ==
Kyuquot Sound has main arms that branch out into the interior of Vancouver Island. Numerous islands can be found within the sound, the largest of which are Union Island, Hohoae Island, Moketas Island, Whiteley Island, and Surprise Island. Rugged Point Marine Provincial Park lies to the southern end of the sound while Tahsish-Kwois Provincial Park protects one of the northern arms.

== See also ==
- Brooks Peninsula Provincial Park
- British Columbia Coast
- Quatsino Sound
- Nootka Sound
- Clayoquot Sound
- Barkley Sound
