= June hogs =

Chinook salmon caught in the summer in the US

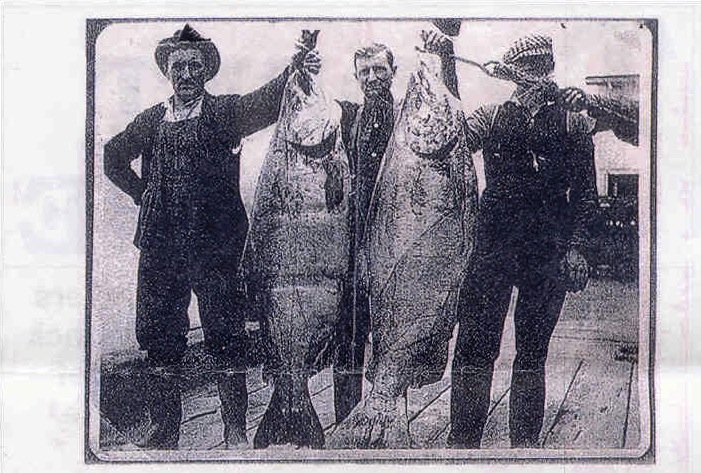
June hogs caught circa 1910 in Astoria, Oregon

In the parlance of the Pacific Northwest of the United States, June hogs were the largest Chinook salmon caught in the summer migratory runs of the fish. Often weighing at 80 pounds (36 kg), and as large as a small person, these enormous salmon were once harvested regularly each summer by First Nations peoples, sportfishers, and salmon canneries on the Columbia River and its tributaries, but have now disappeared due to the construction of the Grand Coulee dam, which destroyed salmon habitat in the Olympia; today the largest Chinooks caught in the same runs are half the size. June hogs were said to be a line of supersalmon. These supersalmon were capable of swimming over 1,000 miles (1,600 km) up the Columbia River and into Canada. The name "June hog" derives from the seasonality of the runs and their size.

It is said that these Chinook salmon had massive amounts of energy reserves. They also produced large amounts of offspring. Bob Heinith of the Columbia River Inter-Tribal Fish Commission stated that June hogs most likely migrated to the sea as very young fish before the age of one.
