= Rugged Point Marine Provincial Park =

Canadian provincial park

Rugged Point Provincial Park
- IUCN category II (national park)
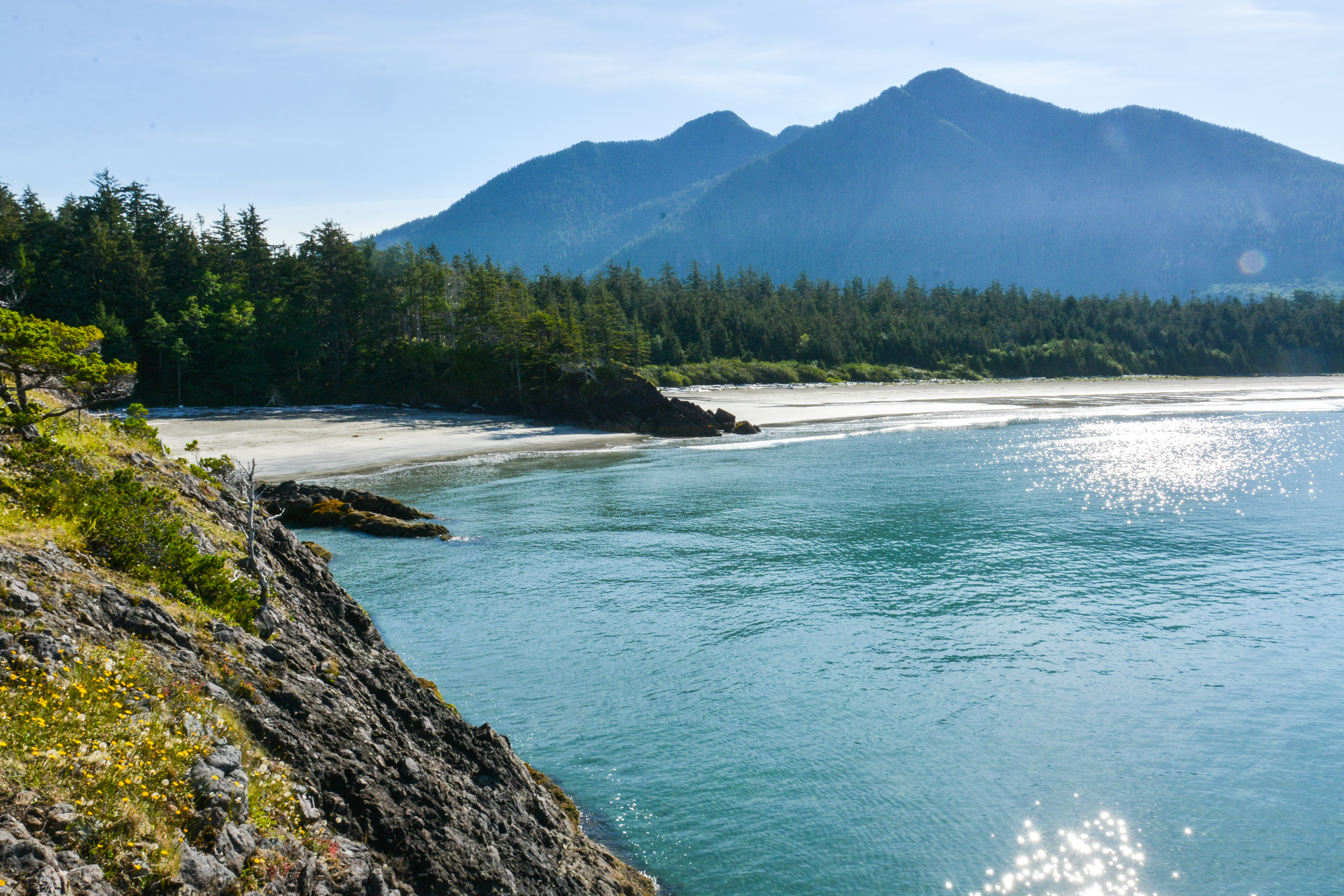
- Panoramic view

- Location within Vancouver Island Location within British Columbia
- Interactive map of Rugged Point Provincial Park
- Location: British Columbia, Canada
- Nearest city: Zeballos
- Coordinates: 49°57′57″N 127°14′31″W
- Area: 3.49 km^{2} (1.35 sq mi)
- Established: August 10, 1989
- Governing body: BC Parks

Rugged Point Marine Provincial Park is a provincial park in British Columbia, Canada, located at the southeast entrance to Kyuquot Sound on the west coast of Vancouver Island. It is remote and largely visited by kayakers.
