= Big Bunsby Marine Provincial Park =

Provincial park in British Columbia, Canada

- IUCN category II (national park)
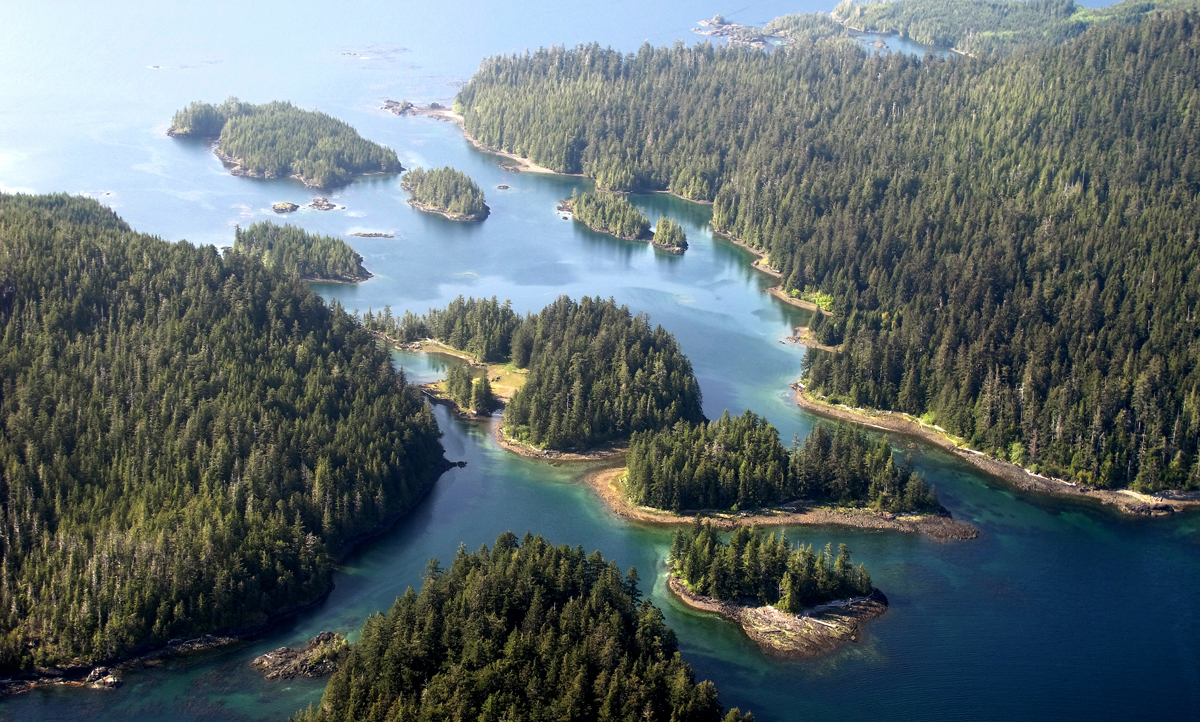
- Islands of Big Bunsby

- Location within Vancouver Island Location within British Columbia
- Interactive map of Big Bunsby Marine Provincial Park
- Location: Checleset Bay, British Columbia
- Coordinates: 50°06′09″N 127°31′50″W
- Area: 658 ha (1,630 acres)
- Designation: Marine Provincial Park
- Established: 30 April 1996
- Governing body: BC Parks

Big Bunsby Marine Provincial Park is a provincial park located on the west coast of northern Vancouver Island in British Columbia, Canada. It lies southeast of the Brooks Peninsula in Checleset Bay and is accessible only by boat.

The park is an excellent spot for observing gray whales, bald eagles, and sea otters. It covers an area of 658 hectares (1,630 acres).
