= Solander Island Ecological Reserve =

Ecological reserve in British Columbia

- IUCN category Ia (strict nature reserve)
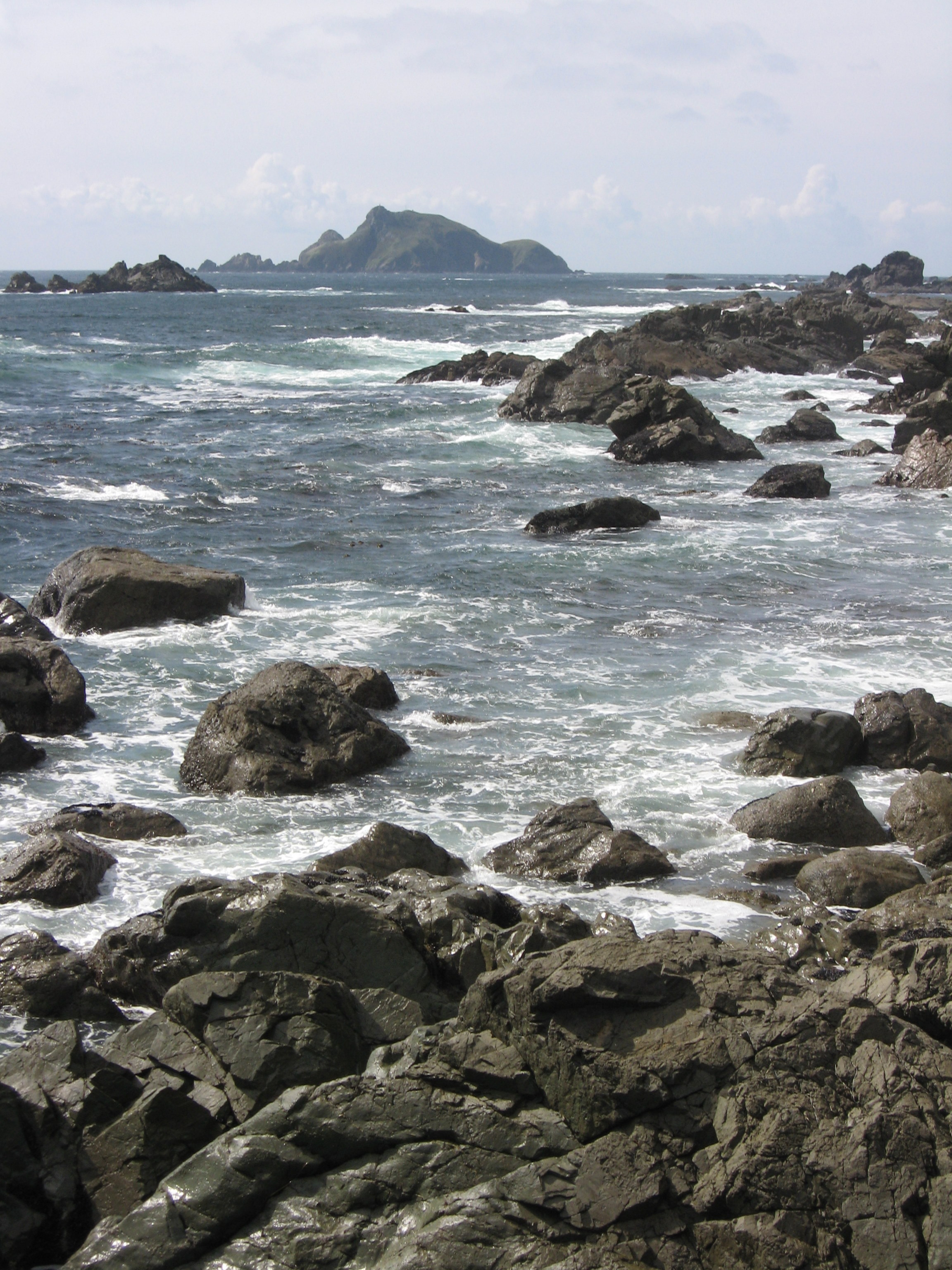
- Solander Island in the distance, seen from Brooks Peninsula

- Location within Vancouver Island Location within British Columbia
- Location: British Columbia, Canada
- Coordinates: 50°06′00″N 127°56′00″W
- Area: 7.7 ha (19 acres)
- Max. elevation: 90 metres (300 ft)
- Established: May 4, 1971
- Governing body: BC Parks

Solander Island Ecological Reserve is a 7.7 ha (19 acres) protected area on an island 1.5 km (0.9 mi) west of Brooks Peninsula Provincial Park off the northwest coast of Vancouver Island in British Columbia, Canada. It was established in 1971. The reserve is closed to the public to protect the habitat of nesting seabirds.

The island was named in honour of Daniel Carlsson Solander, similar to the Solander Islands off New Zealand. It was previously referred to as "Solander Rock" and "Split Rock". A weather station is maintained by Environment Canada.

== Ecology ==
Solander Island does not have any trees. It is covered in grass and low-growing vegetation. Plant species observed on the island include salmonberry and hairy goldfields (Lasthenia maritima), a plant of special concern in British Columbia.

Solander Island is home to numerous bird species including the tufted puffin, Leach's storm petrel, Cassin's auklet, pelagic cormorant, glaucous-winged gull and pigeon guillemot. The island is devoid of land mammals, but is used as a seasonal haul-out for Steller sea lions, California sea lions, and sea otters.
