= Refugium Range =

Mountain range in Canada

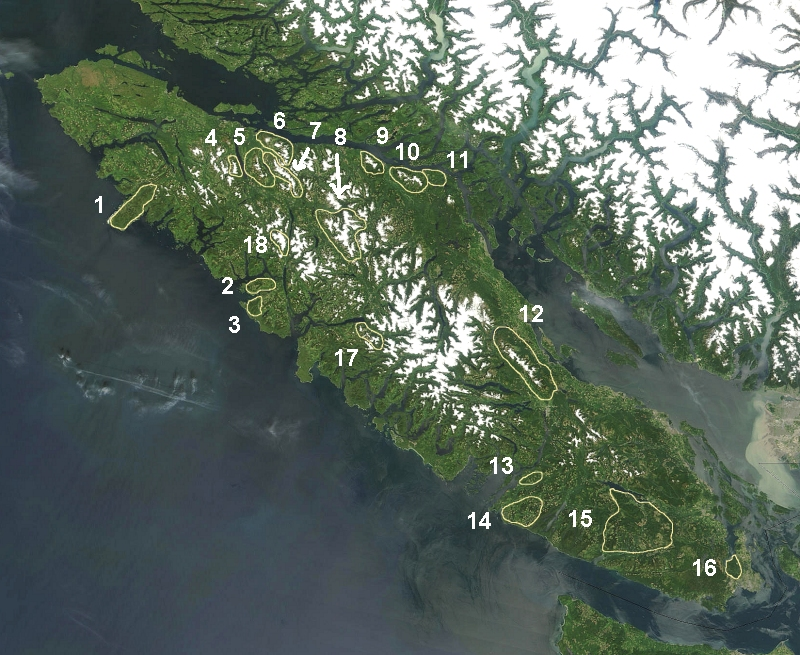
- The Refugium Range is marked 1 on map

Highest point
- Coordinates: 50°09′00″N 127°46′00″W

Geography
- Location within British Columbia
- Country: Canada
- Region: British Columbia
- Parent range: Vancouver Island Ranges

The Refugium Range is a low, small mountain range comprising the mountains/hills of the Brooks Peninsula on northern Vancouver Island, British Columbia, Canada. It has an area of 239 km^{2} (92 sq mi) and is a subrange of the Vancouver Island Ranges which in turn form part of the Insular Mountains. The range was named in 1981 by an expedition which found that peaks higher than 700 m (2,300 ft) were above the glaciers during the last ice age and are therefore a refugium with unique plants.

== See also ==
- List of mountain ranges
- Brooks Peninsula Provincial Park
- Brooks Peninsula
