= Tahsish-Kwois Provincial Park =

Provincial park in British Columbia, Canada

- IUCN category II (national park)
- Location within Vancouver Island Location within British Columbia
- Interactive map of Tahsish-Kwois Provincial Park
- Location: British Columbia, Canada
- Nearest city: Port McNeill
- Coordinates: 50°12′05″N 127°09′37″W
- Area: 109.87 km^{2} (42.42 sq mi)
- Established: July 13, 1995
- Governing body: BC Parks

Tahsish-Kwois Provincial Park is a provincial park in British Columbia, Canada. Located west of Woss Lake, it is approximately 10,829 ha. in size.
