= Brooks Peninsula Provincial Park =

Provincial park in British Columbia, Canada

M𐞥uqʷin/Brooks Peninsula Provincial Park
- IUCN category Ib (wilderness area)
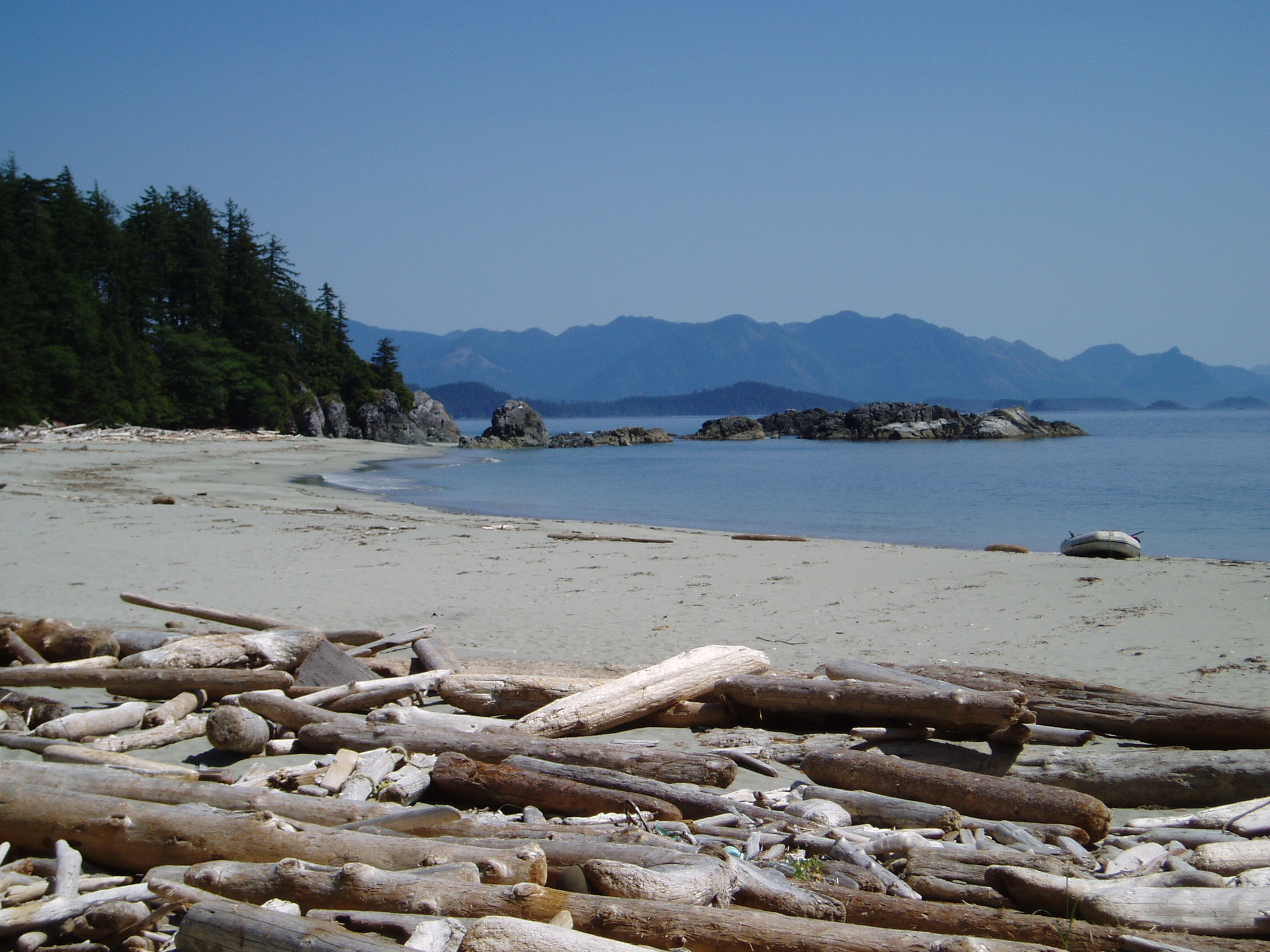
- A deserted beach on southern coast of the Brooks Peninsula

- Location within Vancouver Island Location within British Columbia
- Interactive map of M𐞥uqʷin/Brooks Peninsula Provincial Park
- Location: British Columbia, Canada
- Nearest city: Port Alice
- Coordinates: 50°08′23″N 127°47′00″W
- Area: 51,631 ha (199.35 sq mi)
- Established: December 10, 1995
- Governing body: BC Parks

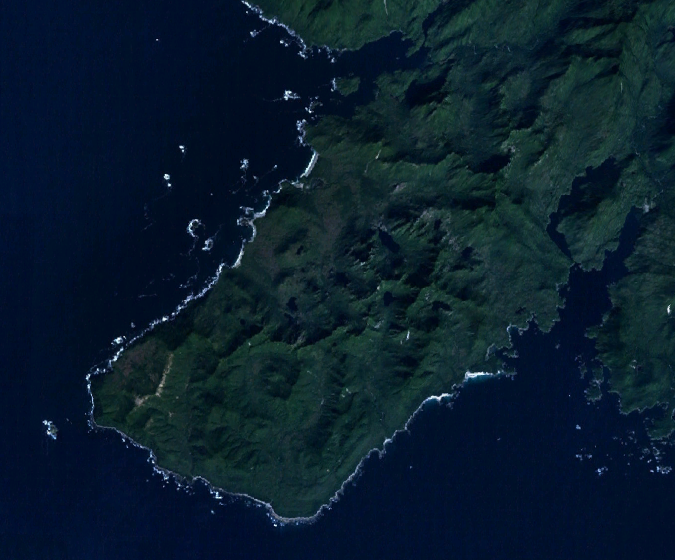
Satellite picture of the Brooks Peninsula

Parts of this article have been adapted from the BC Parks website.

M𐞥uqʷin/Brooks Peninsula Provincial Park is a provincial park located on the west coast of Vancouver Island in British Columbia, Canada.

== History ==
As a result of land-use planning for Vancouver Island, this former 28,780 hectare (71,117 acre) recreation area (established in 1986) was upgraded in 1995 to a Class 'A' Provincial Park. In addition to this upgrade, 22,851 hectares (56,466 acres) known as the Brooks-Nasparti area, has been added to the park. On July 13, 2009, the park was renamed Brooks Peninsula Provincial Park (a.k.a. M𐞥uqʷin Provincial Park) and, in 2018, M𐞥uqʷin/Brooks Peninsula Provincial Park under the guidance of the Che:k'tles7et'h' peoples.

== Geography ==
The park is 51,631 hectares (127,583 acres) in size. Brooks Peninsula is located about 20 kilometres or 12 miles southwest of Port Alice, British Columbia. Access to the park is by boat or float plane.

Brooks Peninsula juts 20 kilometres or 12 miles into the Pacific Ocean and has a rugged and varied coastline, with long fjords and sandy beaches. The inland is seldom-explored and densely wooded with mostly old growth forest.

The highest point is a sub-peak of Snowsaddle Mountain at 1,143 metres or 3,750 feet elevation. Mountains in the park, known as the Refugium Range, include Klaskish (963 metres or 3,159 feet), Nunatak (930 metres or 3,051 feet), and Doom (787 metres or 2,582 feet). Peaks in the area higher than 700 metres or 2,300 feet were above the glaciers during the last ice age and are therefore a refugium with unique plants.

== Conservation ==
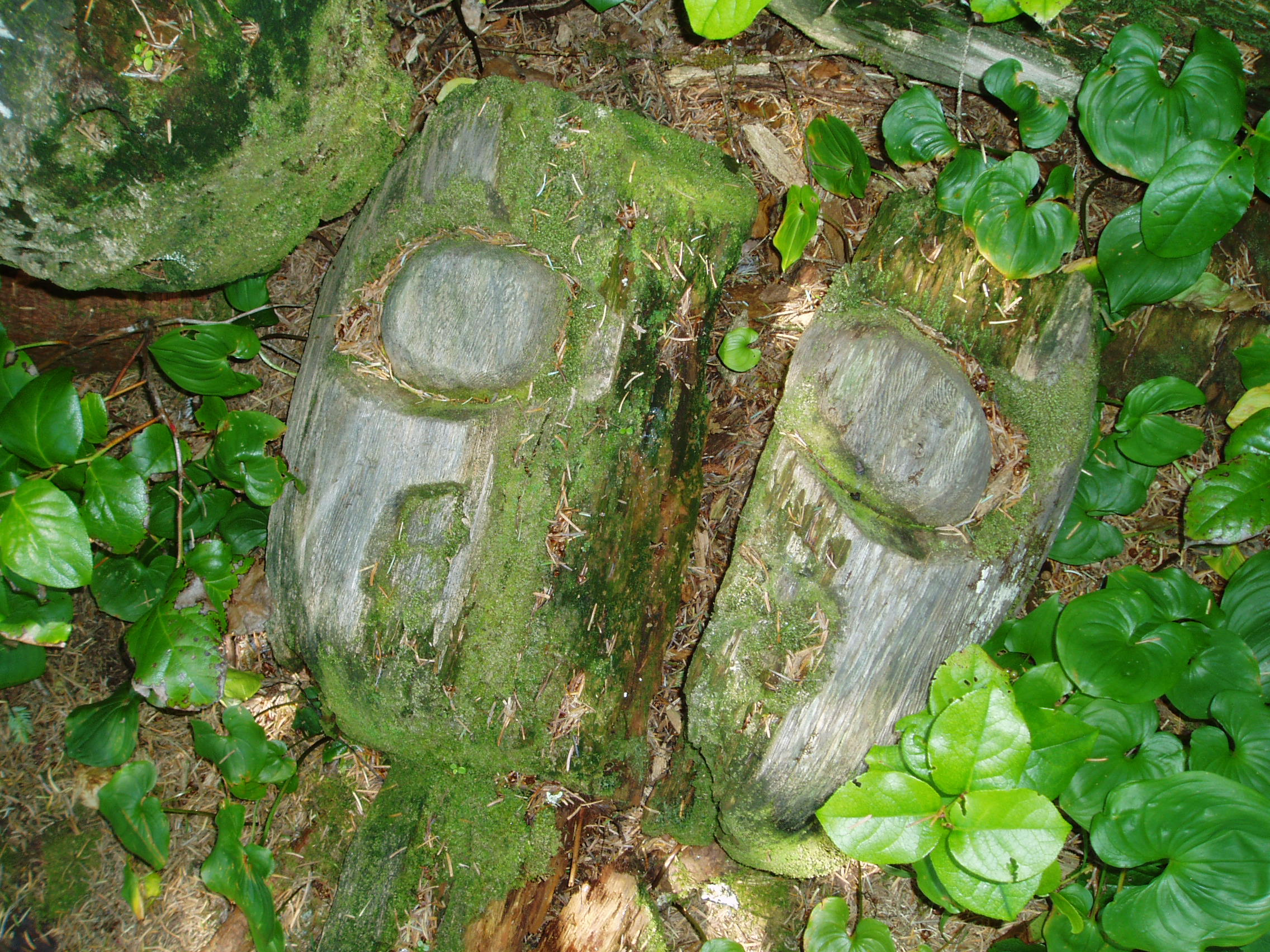
Fallen totem pole near Battle Bay

Unaffected by the last ice age, Brooks Peninsula is considered a unique geologic feature. As a result, the geology of the peninsula is different from that of the rest of Vancouver Island and many rare plant communities exist, providing unparalleled opportunities for scientific study. This remote wilderness area includes an extensive, wild ocean coastline, long sheltered inlets, rugged mountains, pristine estuaries with high waterfowl and fishery values and high biodiversity values associated with old-growth forests. The Brooks-Nasparti addition encompasses the entire watershed of the Nasparti River and streams draining into Johnson Lagoon, the west-facing slopes along Nasparti Inlet, the Power River and Battle Creek watersheds and the Mount Seaton area

The park preserves the peninsula's pristine wilderness landscape, which contains the Refugium Range of the Vancouver Island Ranges and Coastal Western Hemlock biogeoclimatic zone.

== Cultural heritage ==
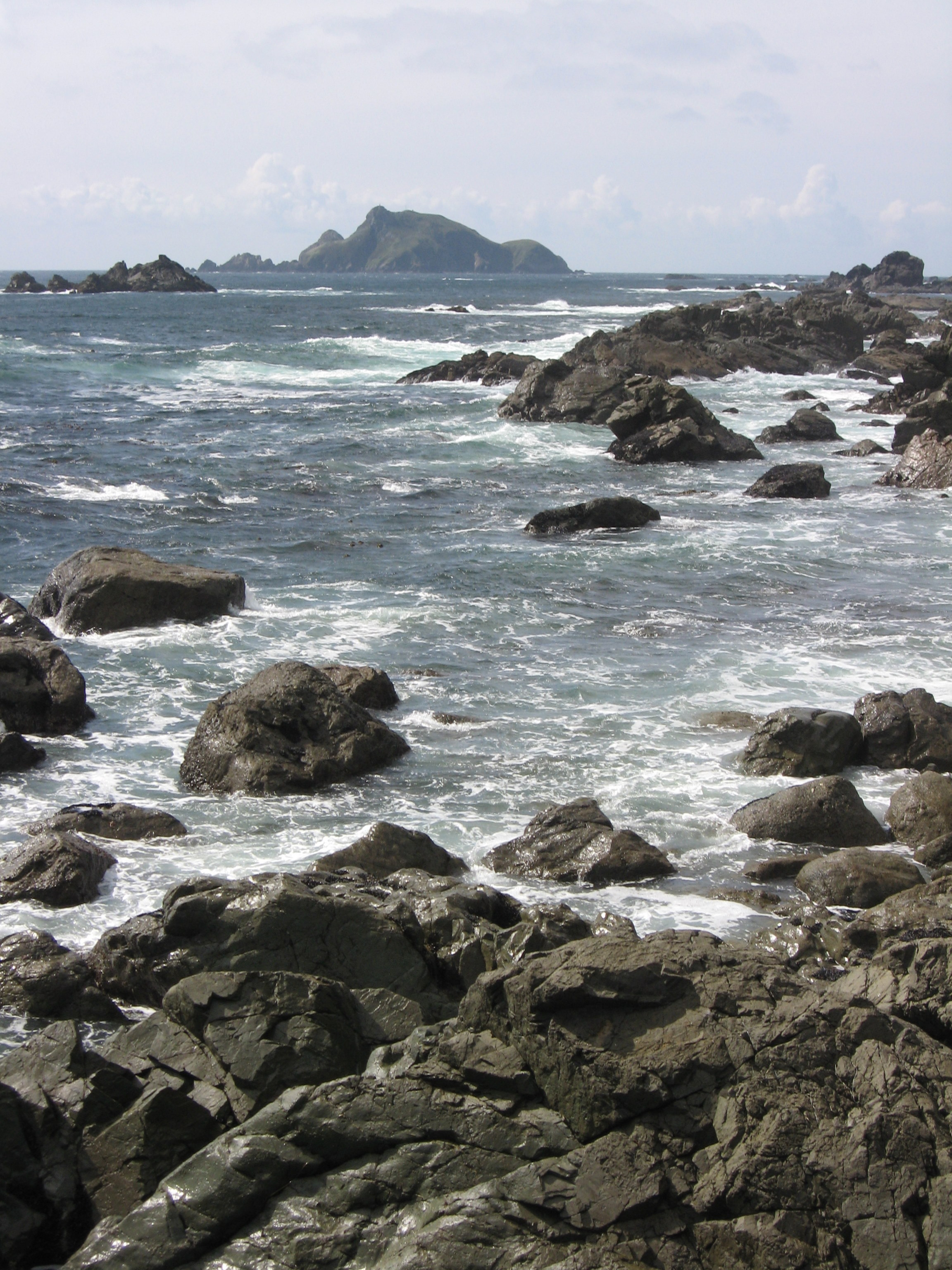
Solander Island Ecological Reserve, as seen from the western tip of Brooks Peninsula

The park is located within the traditional territory of the peoples comprising today's Kyuquot/Cheklesahht and Quatsino First Nations band governments. Battle Bay in the southern portion of the park is rich in First Nations cultural history. Many battles were fought at this location in order to retain control of this prosperous area. First Nations reserves located adjacent to the southern portion of Brooks Peninsula Provincial Park are not for recreational use. Visitors are encouraged to contact the Kyuquot/Cheklesahht First Nation band office in Kyuquot prior to exploring Brooks Peninsula.

== Recreation ==
Brooks Peninsula is infrequently visited; its surrounding waters however provide superb kayaking and canoeing. It is entirely undeveloped and has no marked trails and no facilities, although in some locations ocean debris is placed at known trail heads.

Camping is permitted anywhere in the park, but made complicated due to the remoteness, difficulty of access, and lack of facilities.

Nearby Solander Island is an Ecological Reserve and access is prohibited.

== Gallery ==
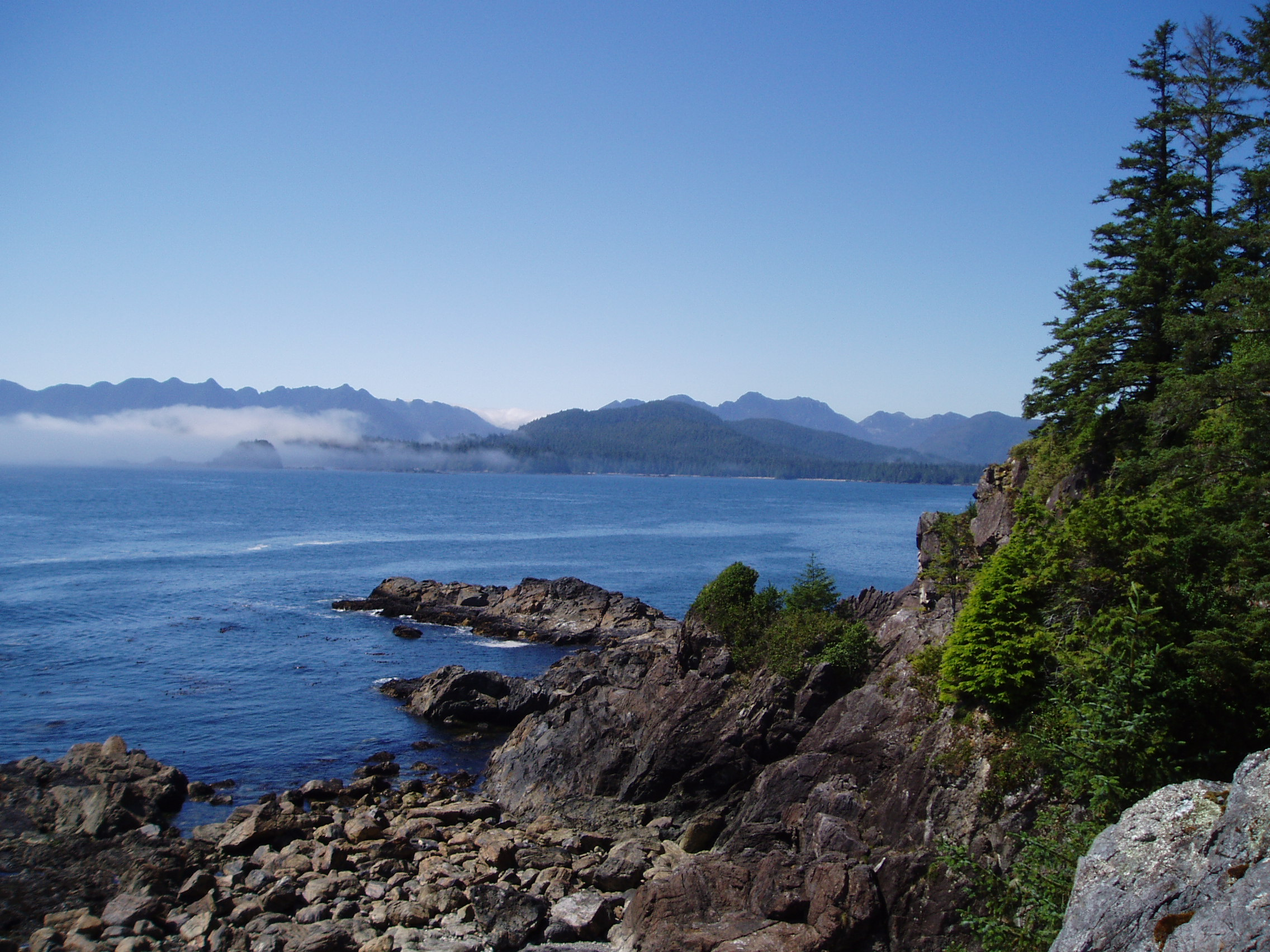
Brooks peninsula from the Bunsby Islands, looking north

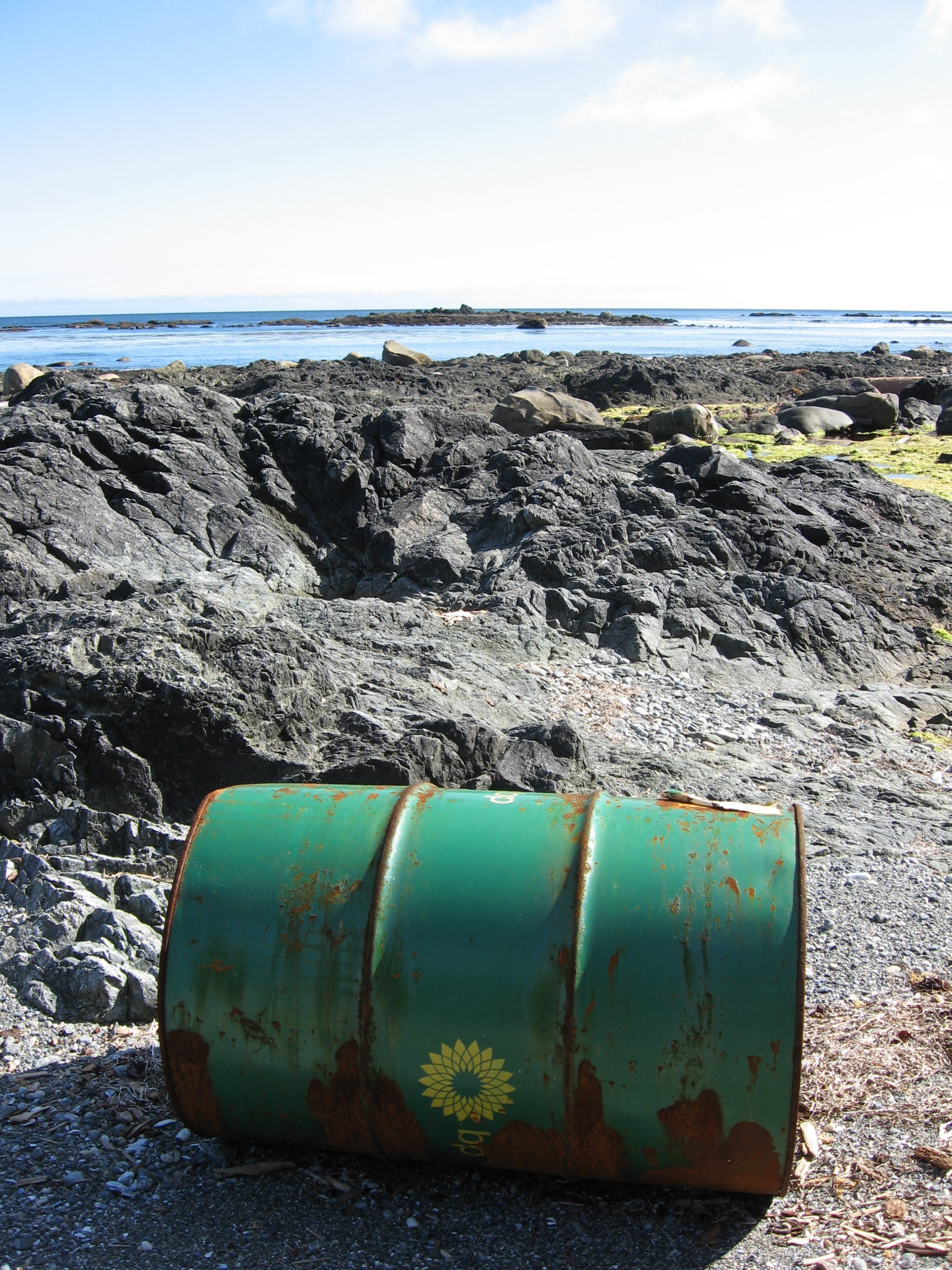
A barrel washed up on the shore, an example of the widespread ocean litter on the peninsula.

== See also ==
- List of British Columbia Provincial Parks
- List of Canadian provincial parks
