= Kyuquot/Cheklesahht First Nation =

Nuu-chah-nulth band government in British Columbia, Canada

Ka:'yu:'k't'h'/Che:k:tles7et'h' First Nations Band No. 638
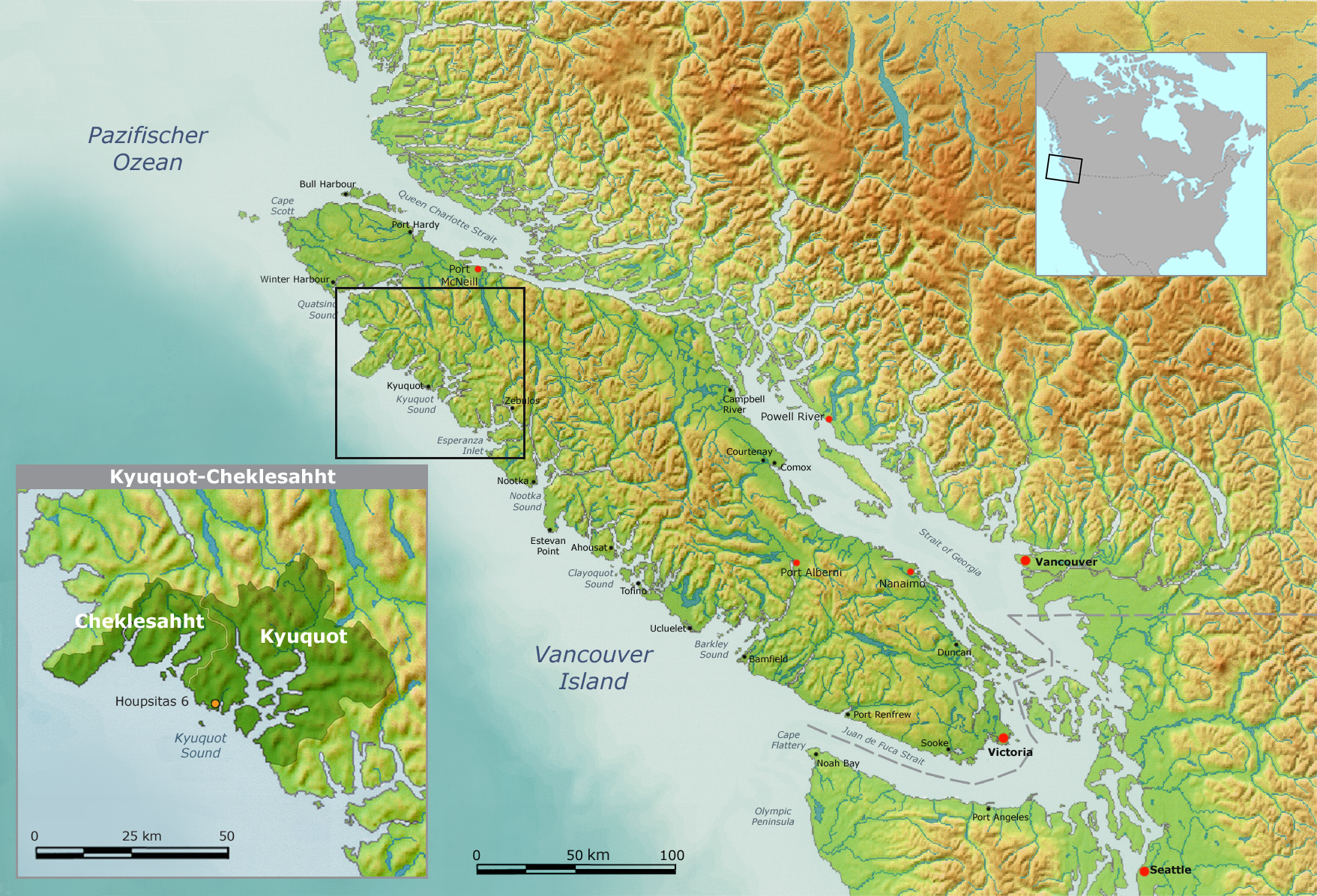
- Map of the traditional territory of the KCFN
- People: Nuu-chah-nulth
- Treaty: Maa-nulth First Nations Treaty
- Headquarters: Kyuquot
- Province: British Columbia

Population (2024)
- On reserve: 164
- On other land: 21
- Off reserve: 397
- Total population: 582

Tribal Council
- Maa-nulth First Nations

Website
- kyuquotbc.ca

The Ka:'yu:'k't'h'/Che:k:tles7et'h' First Nation (KCFN; or Kyuquot/Checleseht) is a modern treaty government located on the west coast of Vancouver Island in British Columbia, Canada. It is a member of the Maa-nulth Treaty Society and the Nuu-chah-nulth Tribal Council.

Before 1951, both the Kyuquot First Nation and the Cheklesath First Nation were separately managed and funded by the then Department of Indian and Northern Affairs. The Cheklesath people were very few in numbers and were not receiving adequate funding for housing and infrastructure from the federal government's Department of Indian and Northern Affairs.

The Chekleset chiefs and elders met with the Kyuquot chiefs and elders to ask if their people could live amongst the Kyuquot people. The Kyuquot chiefs and elders agreed to allow the Cheklesath to live on Č'axwataqt (Mission Island), but were not granted any rights in Kyuquot affairs. They were to remain a separate nation until conditions warranted their return to their own territory.

In 1962, the Kyuquot and the Cheklesath bands amalgamated.

As part of the Maa-nulth Treaty Society, they were one of five signatories to the Maa-nulth First Nations Treaty, which came into effect in 2011, making them a self-governing First Nation.

== See also ==
- Checleset Bay
- Kyuquot, British Columbia
- Kyuquot Sound
- Nuu-chah-nulth
- Nuu-chah-nulth language
