= Northwest Passage Drive Expedition =

The Northwest Passage Drive Expedition (NWPDX) (2009–2011)

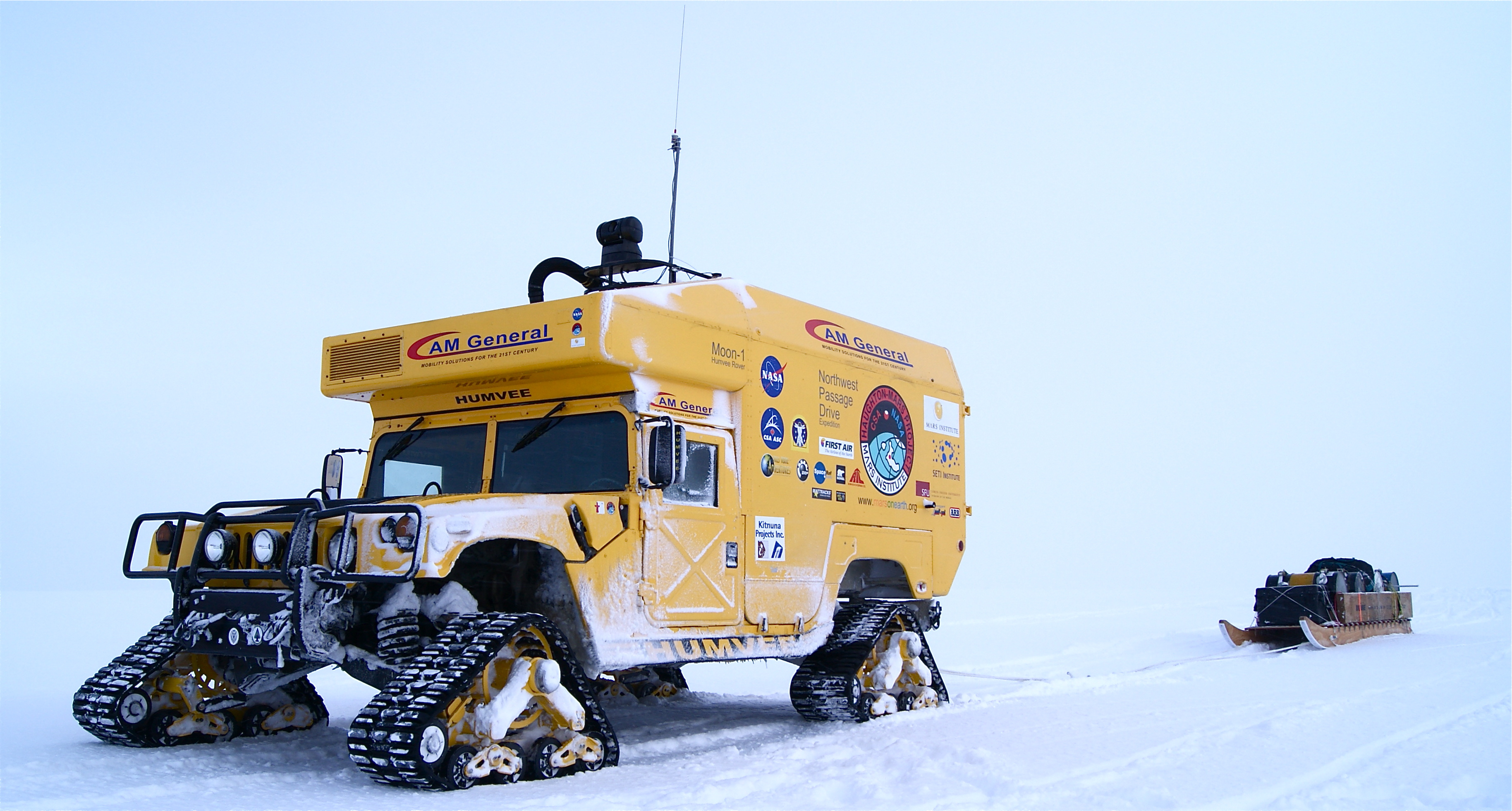
The HMP Okarian during the NWPDX.

The Northwest Passage Drive Expedition (NWPDX) (2009–2011) was a multi-stage vehicular expedition from the North American mainland to Devon Island in the high Arctic, by way of the Northwest Passage. The expedition was led by planetary scientist Pascal Lee. Although the expedition was primarily logistical and was not intended to be a high fidelity simulation of a crewed pressurized rover traverse on the Moon or Mars, it was the first long-distance road trip dedicated to planetary exploration studies and provided important lessons for planning future long-range vehicular traverses off Earth. The expedition was also the first crossing of the Northwest Passage in a road vehicle. The first stage of the expedition, NWPDX-2009, established a record for the longest distance driven continuously on sea-ice in a road vehicle: 496 km (308 mi).

The expedition’s main objective was to deliver the Mars Institute's HMP Okarian rover (a.k.a. Moon-1 Humvee Rover), a modified Humvee serving as a planetary pressurized rover simulator, from the North American mainland to the Haughton-Mars Project Research Station on Devon Island. Once delivered, the HMP Okarian would be used for research - through simulations of planetary excursion missions - to plan future human Moon and Mars exploration. The Northwest Passage Drive Expedition was proposed by HMP principal investigator Pascal Lee when rover operations on Devon Island using the HMP’s first Humvee alone, the Mars-1, proved too risky, and a second Humvee (the HMP Okarian) became needed at the HMP site.

The expedition’s secondary objectives were scientific: to measure the thickness of the sea-ice along the Northwest Passage to document Climate change in the Arctic; to quantify the potential microbial forward contamination of future pressurized rover traverses on the Moon and Mars; and to study the logistics of planning and implementing pressurized rover traverses on the Moon and Mars.

The expedition was supported by NASA, the Mars Institute, and the SETI Institute. Other government agencies (Air National Guard, Canadian Space Agency, Nunavut Research Institute, Polar Continental Shelf Project, and others) and private partners (AM General, Bombardier Recreational Products, Mattracks Inc., First Air, and others) provided additional support.

== Overview ==
The Northwest Passage Drive Expedition took place in three stages over the course of three arctic field seasons, departing Kugluktuk on the North American mainland in April 2009, and ending at the Haughton-Mars Project Research Station on Devon Island in July 2011. The three stages of the expedition are designated NWPDX-2009, NWPDX-2010, and NWPDX-2011.

The NWPDX-2009 expedition departed Kugluktuk on 10 April 2009, and reached Cambridge Bay on Victoria Island on 17 April 2009. The HMP Okarian was then flown by the US Air National Guard from Cambridge Bay to Resolute Bay on Cornwallis Island in May 2009. The NWPDX-2010 expedition departed Resolute Bay on 5 May 2010, and reached the West coast of Devon Island on 16 May 2010. The NWPDX-2011 expedition departed the West coast of Devon Island on 18 July 2011, and reached the HMP Research Station on 20 July 2011. The NWPDX-2009 and 2010 expeditions consisted of the HMP Okarian equipped with tracks, and two snowmobiles, each vehicle towing a qamutiik sled loaded with equipment and supplies. The NWPDX-2011 expedition consisted of the HMP Okarian on wheels, escorted by two all-terrain vehicles or quad bikes.

== Preparations ==
Initial planning of the expedition took place in 2008 and 2009. The HMP Okarian was originally a military ambulance Humvee on loan from AM General to Hollywood where it was featured in many films and TV shows, notably in The Rock (1996). When the Northwest Passage Drive Expedition project was approved, the vehicle was called back to the AM General factory to be refurbished and modified to become the HMP Okarian.

== Journey ==
=== NWPDX-2009 ===
The 2009 campaign was led by Lee and included geologist and explorer John Schutt as expedition navigator and field guide, arctic expert Joe Amarualik as expedition scout, vehicle engineer Jesse Weaver as expedition technician, and documentary filmmaker Mark Carroll as cameraman. The expedition departed Kugluktuk on 10 April 2009 but soon encountered difficulties with weather and thick snow cover on the sea-ice which slowed down progress and increased fuel consumption. On 15 April 2009, the HMP Okarian was almost lost in an ice lead incident, but was successfully salvaged by the expedition team. The expedition reached Cambridge Bay on 17 April 2009. The HMP Okarian was subsequently airlifted by the US Air National Guard from Cambridge Bay to Resolute Bay in May 2009.

=== NWPDX-2010 ===
The 2010 campaign was led by Lee and included the same team members as the NWPDX-2009 expedition, plus filmmaker Jean-Christophe Jeauffre as documentary film director. The expedition departed Resolute Bay on 5 May 2010 but the HMP Okarian soon experienced a series of mechanical problems, including the breakage of critical parts on 6 May 2010 and again on 13 May 2010. The expedition was ultimately completed when Lee sent Amarualik back to Resolute Bay solo by snowmobile to retrieve a replacement part, and later Schutt and Weaver to the HMP Research Station on Devon Island, also by snowmobile, to scavenge a replacement part from the Mars-1 Humvee Rover. The expedition, including the HMP Okarian, eventually reached the west coast of Devon Island on 16 May 2010, at a location subsequently named Humvee Beach.

=== NWPDX-2011 ===
The 2011 campaign was led by Lee and included space engineer Robert Mueller of NASA Kennedy Space Center as navigator, vehicle engineer Jesse Weaver as expedition technician, and filmmaker Jody Shapiro as cameraman. The expedition departed Humvee Beach on 18 July 2011, and reached the HMP Research Station on 20 July 2011.

== Accomplishments ==
Although the expedition experienced a number of challenges, including an instance where the HMP Okarian was almost lost in a sea-ice lead, it was successful in achieving its primary goal of safely delivering the rover to the Haughton-Mars Project Research Station on Devon Island. The expedition was also successful in meeting its secondary goal of collecting new data relating to the planning and implementation of future long-range crewed pressurized rover traverses on the Moon and Mars, including the first field study of the risk of forward contamination during future crewed rover operations. While the HMP Okarian experienced a series of mechanical problems during its journey, some requiring that crew members be dispatched to retrieve spare parts and supplies, all such retrievals and repairs were carried out by the expedition crew alone, as a crew on the Moon or Mars would need to were it stranded some distance away from a base or a cache of supplies.

Ancillary to its main goals, the expedition achieved the first crossing of the Northwest Passage in a road vehicle. The first stage of the expedition, NWPDX-2009, established a record for the longest distance driven continuously on sea-ice in a road vehicle: 496 km (308 mi).

== Outreach ==
=== Okarian Name ===
The HMP Okarian was originally named Moon-1 Humvee Rover and painted yellow, to distinguish it from the red-colored Mars-1 Humvee Rover already is use on the Haughton-Mars Project. The Moon-1 was subsequently renamed Okarian, in reference to the Okarians imagined by Edgar Rice Burroughs in The Warlord of Mars, a race of Yellow Martians who migrated to the North Pole of Mars and lived there in domed cities.

=== Passage To Mars ===
The Northwest Passage Drive Expedition is captured in the documentary film Passage to Mars (2016), directed by Jean-Christophe Jeauffre, and narrated by Zachary Quinto as Pascal Lee.

== See also ==
- Haughton-Mars Project
- Lead (sea ice)
- Mars
- Mars Institute
- Northwest Passage
- Pascal Lee
