= Schutt =

Schutt is a surname. Alternative spellings are Schütt and Schuett. People with these names include:

== Schutt ==
- Arthur Schutt (1902–1965), American jazz pianist and arranger
- Christine Schutt (born 1948), American novelist and short story writer
- Debra Schutt (born 1955), American set decorator
- Ellen Isham Schutt (1873–1955), American botanical illustrator
- George Schutt (1833–?), Union Navy sailor in the American Civil War
- Helen Macpherson Schutt (1874–1951), Australian philanthropist
- John Schutt (born 1948), American mountaineer, geologist, and explorer
  - Schutt Glacier, Antarctic glacier named after him
- Kate Schutt (born 1975), American singer and songwriter
- Megan Schutt (born 1993), Australian cricketer
- Rod Schutt (born 1956), Canadian ice hockey player
- Scott Schutt (born 1963), American football player
- Stephen D. Schutt (born 1954), American college president
- Will Schutt (born 1981), American poet

== Schütt ==
- Eduard Schütt (1856–1933), Russian composer, pianist, and conductor
- Günther Schütt (1918–1996), German rower
- Roland Schütt (1913–2005), Swedish author

== Schuett ==
- Dianne Schuett, American politician
- Gordon W. Schuett (born 1957), American evolutionary biologist and herpetologist

== See also ==
- Schut, a Dutch surname
- Schutte, a Dutch and German surname
- Schutt, Ontario, small town in NE Ontario
- Schutt Sports, American sports equipment company
