= Darlene Lim =

NASA geobiologist and exobiologist

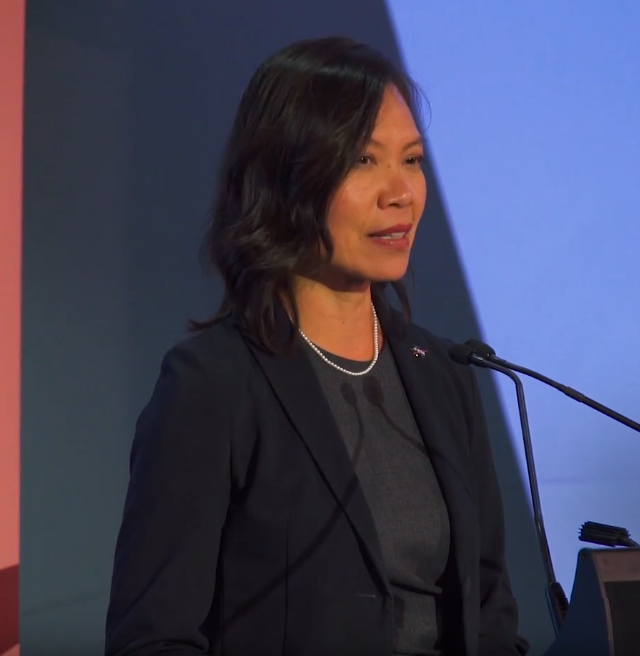
- Lim in 2019
- Born: Kingston, Ontario, Canada
- Education: Queen's University at Kingston (BS); University of Toronto (MS, PhD)
- Known for: NASA analog research
- Scientific career
- Fields: Geobiology
- Workplaces: NASA Ames Research Center, Silicon Valley, California
- Doctoral advisor: Marianne Douglas
- Other academic advisors: John Smol
- Website: www.darlenelimology.com

External media

Audio
- "Darlene Lim", Science Friday
- "Darlene Lim, SHAD '89 & AMES Research Center Scientist on CHML"

Video
- "Dr. Darlene Lim – Geobiologist, NASA Ames – 20th Annual International Mars Society Convention"
- "Darlene Lim – Looking For Life On Mars", IdeaCity2004

Darlene Sze Shien Lim is a NASA geobiologist and exobiologist who prepares astronauts for scientific exploration of the Moon, Deep Space and Mars. Her expertise involves Mars human analog missions, in which extreme landscapes like volcanoes and Arctic deserts serve as physical or operational substitutes for various planetary bodies. She has become a leading public figure for Mars exploration, having presented her missions publicly at academic institutions and public events around the world. She has also discussed her work for various media groups such as NPR, The New York Times, and The Washington Post.

== Background ==
Lim is a first-generation Canadian; her parents emigrated from Singapore and she was born in Kingston, Ontario. She grew up "spending time in the Canadian Rockies, and watching Jacques Cousteau on TV." She studied biology at Queen's University at Kingston as an undergraduate, and graduated in 1994. She credited Professor John P. Smol for igniting her interest in limnology, the study of lakes and ponds.

Lim subsequently completed a master's and doctoral degree in geology at the University of Toronto in 1999 and 2004 respectively. She was already working on NASA-sponsored projects such as the Haughton–Mars Project, which involved studying the Arctic craters as simulated Martian environments. She became a postdoctoral researcher with Christopher McKay at NASA Ames in 2004, and later became a NASA staff scientist and project leader.

== Public outreach ==
=== In popular media ===
Lim has completed dozens of radio interviews with the CBC throughout her PhD. From 2008 to 2009, Lim's work was part of POLAR-PALOOZA: Stories from a Changing Planet, a traveling exhibit sponsored by the NSF and NASA. She was the lead guest on the NASA Ames podcast in 2016. A profile of her Mars-simulation colony in Hawaiʻi (BASALT) appeared in the Chicago Tribune. Lim appeared on the SAGANet/SpaceTV Ask an Astrobiologist! streaming program in 2017. She appeared twice on the Science Friday radio hour in 2018, contributing a 25-minute segment about undersea volcanic exploration tuned in to by over a million listeners. Lim participated in the Frontiers for Life in Space panel at the MIT Media Lab. She was a judge in the HP "Home Mars" VR competition in 2018. In 2019, she presented the opening lecture of the newly renamed Solar System Exploration Research Virtual Institute (SSERVI). She gave a 2025 public lecture on human-robotic exploration in the Silicon Valley Astronomy Lecture Series.

=== Volunteer service ===
Lim serves on the Ocean Exploration Advisory Board of NOAA. She served as a Scientist-in-Residence at the government of Canada's "Marsville" program from 2000 to 2002. From 2009 to 2015, she served as co-chair of the Mars Exploration Program Analysis Group Goal IV (Prepare for Human Exploration). Lim founded the Haven House Family Shelter STEM Explorer's Speaker series, which enabled NASA and academic researchers to conduct education and outreach programs with shelter-based children in the San Francisco Bay Area.

== Research and exploration ==
Lim has taken a decidedly nontraditional path, choosing government labs and public-facing space research over a traditional academic career. As an exobiologist, Lim has explored extreme environments worldwide, from Hawaiʻi and Florida to the Arctic and Antarctic. By studying extreme habitats on earth, researchers like Lim hope to gain insights into conditions that human explorers might face on Mars or other planets. The physical, mental, and operational demands involved in real field science and exploration, under extreme conditions, are comparable to those involved in space exploration missions, giving astronauts an opportunity to train as field scientists and develop and test team protocols and technology.

In 2000, Lim was an inaugural crew member in the first-ever Mars simulated colony in the Arctic, the Flashline Mars Arctic Research Station (FMARS). She participated at the simulated base at Haughton impact crater on Devon Island, Nunavut in both 2000 and 2001.

In 2004, Lim established the Pavilion Lake Research Project in British Columbia, Canada, to study chemical and biological characteristics of microbial geologic formations underwater. She extrapolates from limnological and paleolimnological investigations of bodies of water in the Canadian High Arctic to Holocene climate change and to potential paleolake regions on the surface of Mars. In a 2017 interview, newly minted astronaut Zena Cardman specifically credited Lim, who gave her an opportunity to work at Pavilion Lake, with sparking her interest in NASA exobiology projects.

Lim is the Principal Investigator of SUBSEA, a biogeochemical analogue study for life on other planets. Lim has been a principal investigator in the 2018 Lōʻihi Seamount Expedition on the Exploration Vessel Nautilus, exploring an underwater volcano near the Big Island of Hawaiʻi. The work is supported by the Ocean Exploration Trust, as part of an initiative of Robert Ballard to explore and map the deep ocean. This work examines science related to future robotic exploration of Europa and Enceladus, two Solar System moons with potentially habitable environments. SUBSEA also studies ocean exploration as an analog to future human spaceflight concepts such as Low Latency Telerobotics.

In 2018, Lim and colleague Jennifer Heldmann scouted extreme environments in Iceland in anticipation of a new mission kick-off in 2019. The preparations are being made to support possible missions that could send people to the Moon and to Mars in 2030.

== Awards and honors ==
- 1989: SHAD Fellow
- 2003: Dimitris N. Chorafas Foundation Best Doctoral Thesis of the Year
- 2005: National Geographic Research and Exploration grantee (PLRP)
- 2013: WIRED Magazine "Smart List"
- 2014: NASA Ames Honor Award for Group Achievement, PLRP
- 2018: Keynote speaker, Women in Space conference
- 2019: Air & Space Award, Women of Discovery Awards, WINGS WorldQuest
