= Mattracks Inc. =

American continuous track manufacturer

- Industry: Manufacturing
- Founded: 1995
- Founder: Glen Brazier (CEO)
- Headquarters: Karlstad, Minnesota
- Website: http://www.mattracks.com

Mattracks is an American continuous track manufacturer. It specializes in rubber track conversion systems for wheeled vehicles.

== Products ==
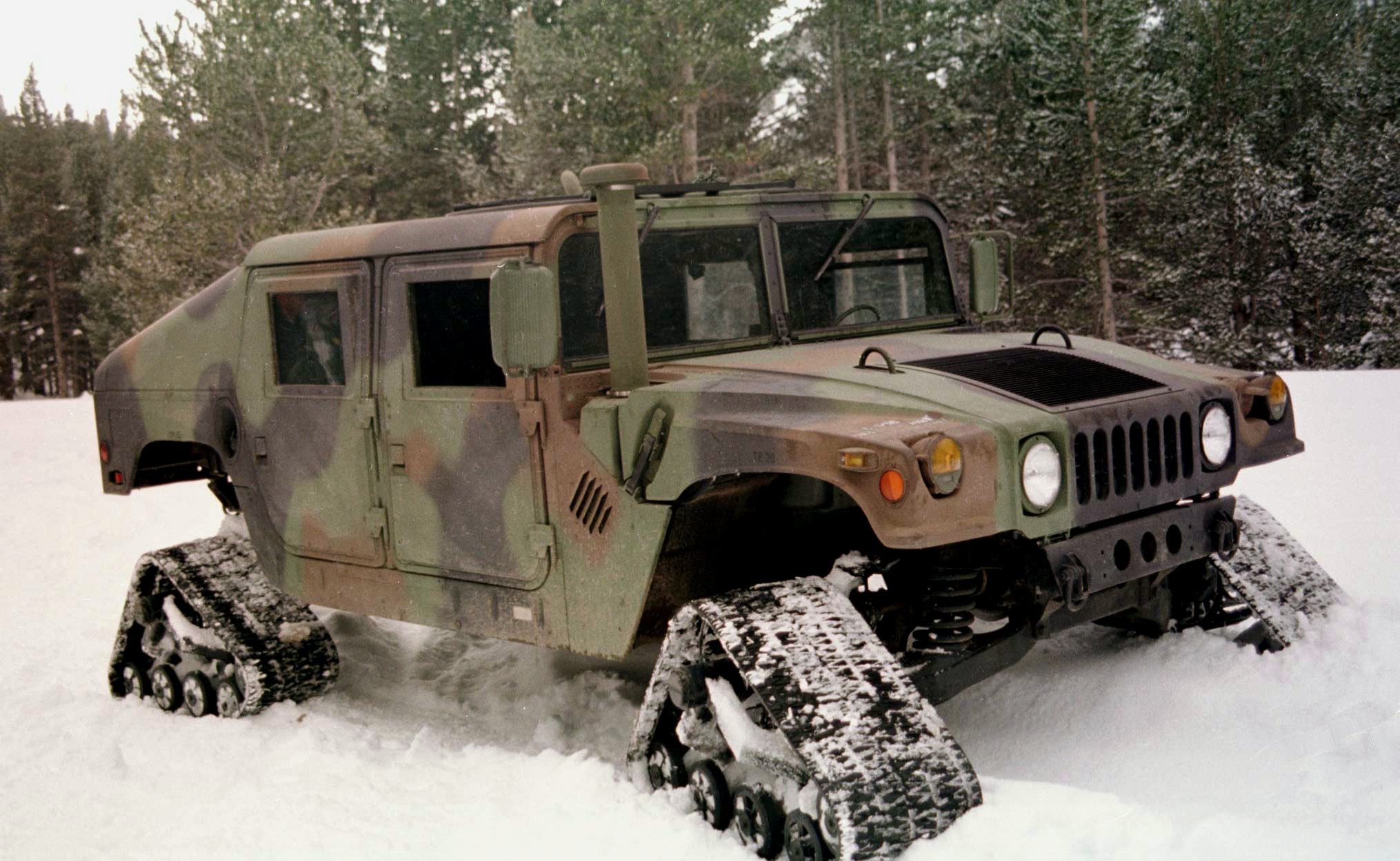
At the Bridgeport, California Mountain Warfare Training Center in March 1997, a test Humvee drives through the snow, equipped with Mattracks treads.

Mattracks on an aerial work platform

The rubber track system is a bolt-on independent unit that takes the place of individual vehicle wheels. One or two people with hand tools and a floor jack can install the entire Mattracks system.

Mattracks also produces a motorized snowboard called the Powerboard.

== History ==
Mattracks was started by Glen Brazier. The company developed out of a drawing by his 11-year-old son, Matt, in which tracks took the place of a truck's tires. The tracks first went on sale in 1994.

The rubber track conversion system was first manufactured in Thief River Falls, Minnesota in 1992. Later, production was moved to its current location in the community of Karlstad, Minnesota. Mattracks, Inc. was incorporated in 1995.

In 2002, Mattracks launched the LiteFoot ATV track conversion systems, adding to the Mattracks rubber track conversion product lineup.

Since 1994, Mattracks has created 72 different models of tracks that can go on four-wheel drive vehicles, ATVs, tractors, and trailers. The tracks are used for recreation, work, commercial and agricultural applications. Mattracks can equip most 4 wheel drive vehicles from a small ATV to trucks up to 25,000 lbs.

== Uses ==
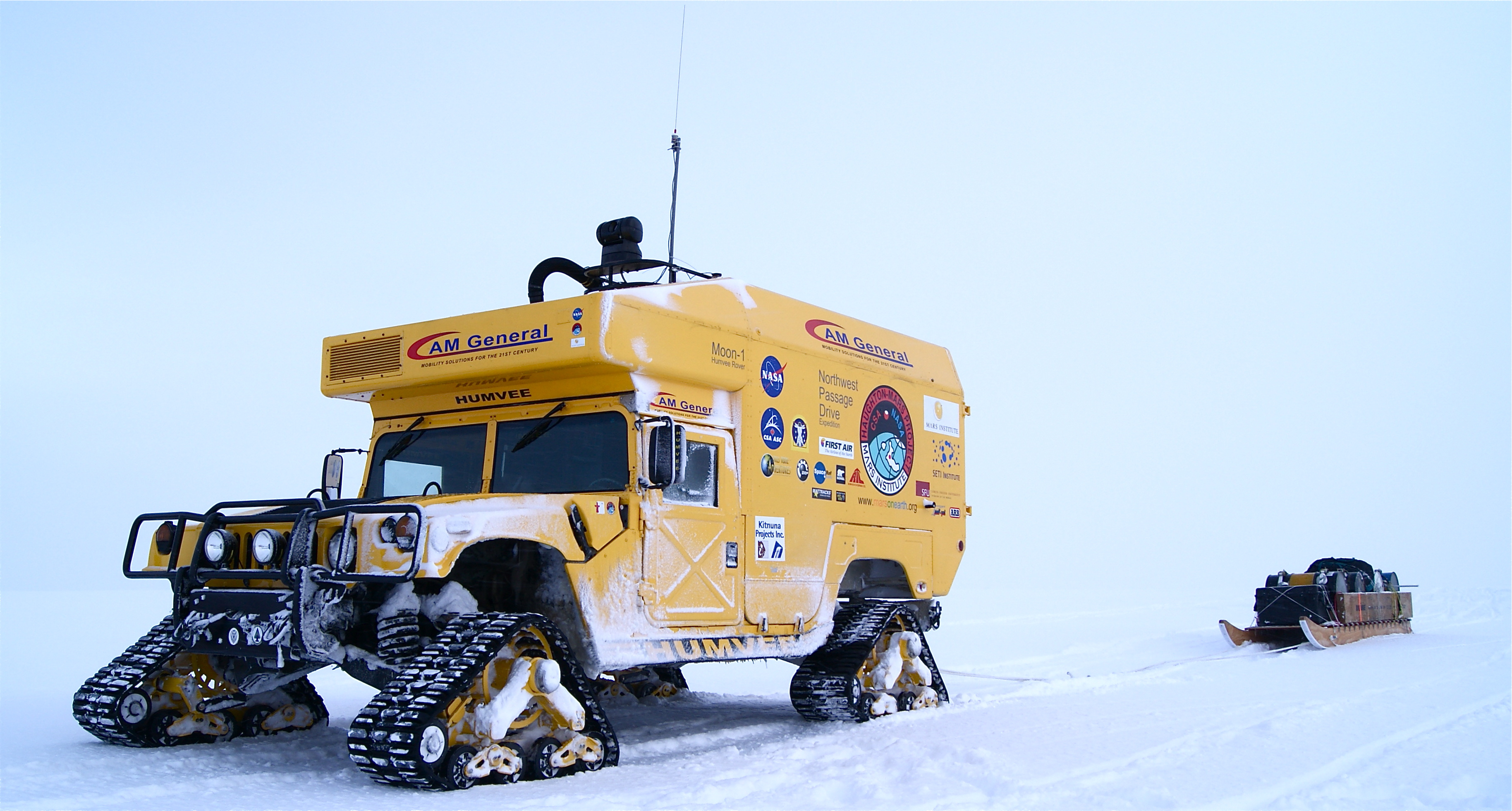
The Mars Institute "HMP Okarian" Humvee with Mattracks during the Northwest Passage Drive Expedition (2009-2011).

Mattracks have been used for a variety of applications, both for work and recreational purposes. Mattracks equipped vehicles have been used to travel over difficult terrain. The track systems have been put to work in industries including agricultural, law enforcement, search and rescue, emergency services and government agencies. Mattracks equipped the Mars Institute's "HMP Okarian" Humvee on the Northwest Passage Drive Expedition. Mattracks are sold worldwide.

== See also ==
- LiteFoot ATV
- Humvee
- Snow coach
- Ford Expedition
- Northwest Passage Drive Expedition
