= Flag of Mars =

Flag or flag design that represents the planet Mars

A flag of Mars is a concept of a possible flag design, meant to symbolize the planet Mars or to represent a fictional Martian government, in works of fiction.

== Proposed flags ==
=== Thomas O. Paine's design ===
A flag design showing Mars as a way station between Earth and the stars

Thomas O. Paine, who served as the third Administrator of NASA, designed a Mars flag in 1984. Paine's Mars flag includes a sliver of Earth on the lower fly side corner of the flag "as a reminder of where we came from, and a star near to the other side, to remind us of where we are going. In the center of the field is a representation of the Mars planet symbol, with its arrow pointing out to the star, acknowledging that Mars is not our destination, merely a way station on a journey that has no ending".

Paine's flag design was illustrated by artist Carter Emmart. That illustration was published on the cover of a periodical titled The Planetary Report. According to Emmart, Paine "created the Mars flag as an award to the person or organization that he felt had contributed most to advancing the human exploration of Mars".

On November 12, 2005, Ray Bradbury received a Mars flag as a part of the "Thomas O. Paine Award for the Advancement of Human Exploration of Mars". The award was presented to Bradbury during The Planetary Society's 25th Anniversary Awards Dinner.

=== Pascal Lee's design ===
Pascal Lee's tricolor flag for Mars

Pascal Lee, a former NASA research engineer designed a tricolor flag for Mars in 1999. It was flown into space on STS-103 by astronaut John M. Grunsfeld. The sequence of colors, from red, to green, and finally blue, represent the transformation of Mars from a lifeless planet to one teeming with life, as inspired by Kim Stanley Robinson's Mars trilogy of novels. It is also flown at the Flashline Mars Arctic Research Station, on behalf of the Mars Society.

== In science fiction ==
Flags of Martian and Earth factions in The Expanse

In the 1953 Chuck Jones animated cartoon featuring Daffy Duck, Duck Dodgers in the 24½th Century, the character Marvin the Martian carries a pink triangular flag with a red circle. In other depictions, the flag may be rectangular and have the letter M over the circle.

In Robert A. Heinlein's 1961 science-fiction novel Stranger in a Strange Land, a flag of Mars is hastily improvised, consisting of "the field in white and the sigil of Mars in red".

In his 1994 science-fiction novel Moving Mars, Greg Bear describes the flag of the fictional Federal Republic of Mars as follows: "red Mars and two moons in blue field above a diagonal, white below".

In the 1996 film Mars Attacks!, the flag of Mars is green with a black circle in the center, a red pyramid in the middle, and an eye on top.

In the 2011 book Leviathan Wakes by James S. A. Corey, the first part of The Expanse series, the flag of Mars is described as depicting the "lonely star, and thirty stripes". However, in the 2015 The Expanse television series, based on The Expanse novel series, the flag of the Martian Congressional Republic (the governing body that rules over the inhabitants of Mars) is divided horizontally into two equal stripes: orange on top, and black on the bottom. In the centre is placed a hollow red circle, symbolizing Mars, with a thin blue crescent attached to its left inner side, symbolizing the terraforming effort, and the limited resources of water and oxygen of the planet's population. In the top stripe, on the left of the circle, slightly above it, is placed a black dot. Accordingly, in the bottom stripe, on the right of the circle, is placed, a slightly smaller, orange dot. They symbolize the moons of the planet, Phobos and Deimos. It was created by graphic designer Jonathan Hunter.

Flag of Mars in Duck Dodgers in the 24½th Century

Marvin the Martian flag

Flag of Mars as described in Stranger in a Strange Land

The flag of the Federal Republic of Mars, as described in Moving Mars

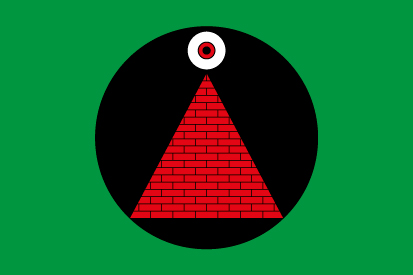
Flag from Mars Attacks!

The flag of the Martian Congressional Republic, as seen in The Expanse television series

== See also ==
- Colonization of Mars
- Human mission to Mars
- Mars Direct
- Mars to Stay
- Human outpost
- Flag of Earth
- Vexillology
