= Stepaside Knoll =

Knoll in Antarctica

Stepaside Knoll (78°13′00″S 161°24′00″E) is an ice-covered knoll rising to 1,829 metres (6,001 ft) in the north part of Stepaside Spur, between Upper Staircase and Schutt Glacier in the Skelton Glacier drainage system.
