= Flashline Mars Arctic Research Station =

Simulated Mars habitat on Devon Island, Nunavut, Canada

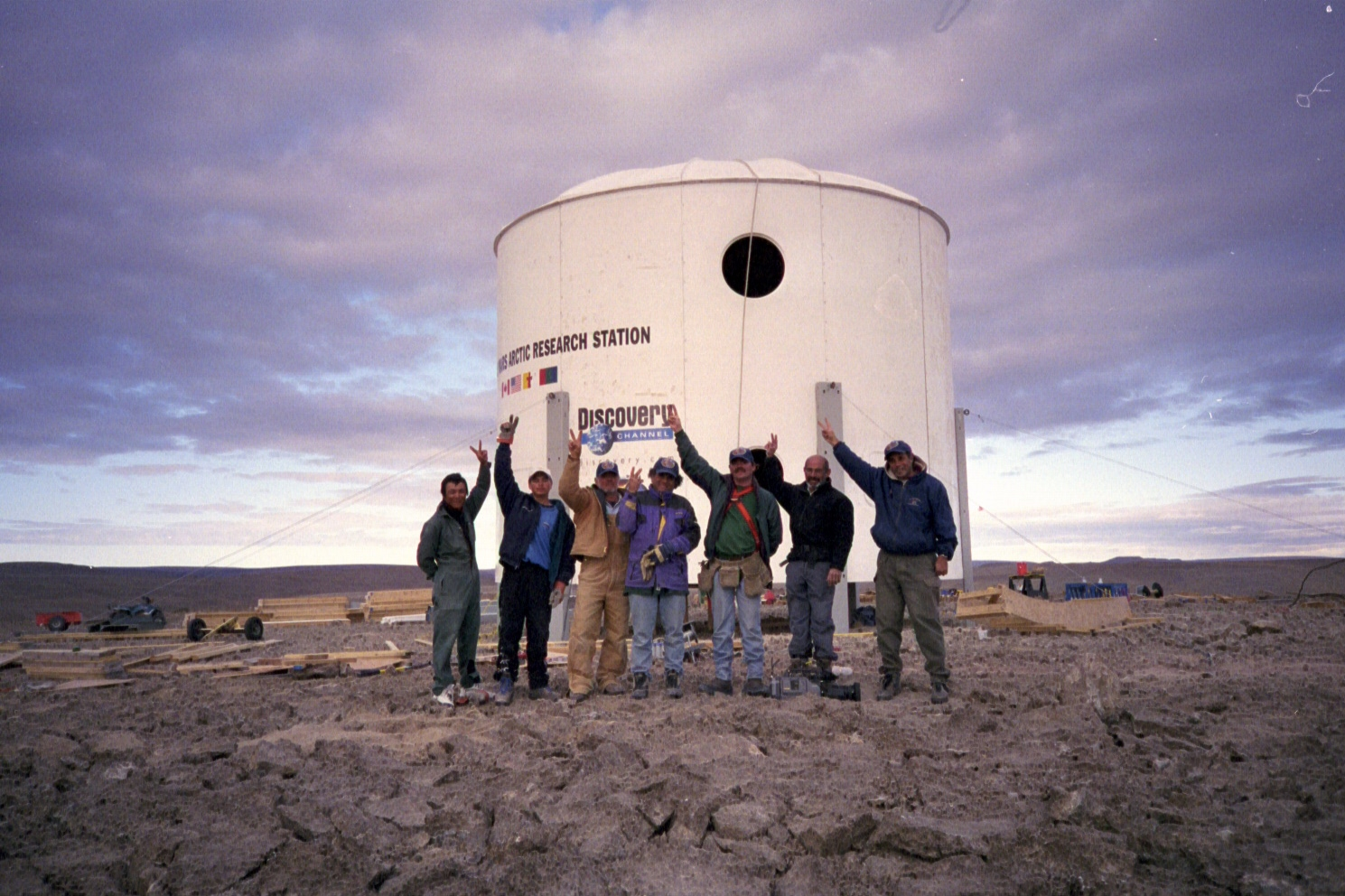
- The completed exterior of the station on July 26, 2000. From left to right are Joe Amarualik, Joannie Pudluk, John Kunz, Frank Schubert, Matt Smola, Bob Nesson, and Robert Zubrin.

- Location within Canada
- Coordinates: 75°25′52.75″N 089°49′24.19″W
- Country: Canada
- Territory: Nunavut
- Region: Qikiqtaaluk Region
- Time zone: UTC-6 (CST)
  - Summer (DST): UTC-5 (CDT)
- Website: fmars.marssociety.org

The Flashline Mars Arctic Research Station (FMARS) is the first of two simulated Mars habitats (or Mars Analog Research Stations) located on Devon Island, Nunavut, Canada, which is owned and operated by the Mars Society. The station is a member of the European Union-INTERACT circumarctic network of currently 89 terrestrial field bases located in northern Europe, Russia, US, Canada, Greenland, Iceland, the Faroe Islands, and Scotland as well as stations in northern alpine areas.

== Background ==
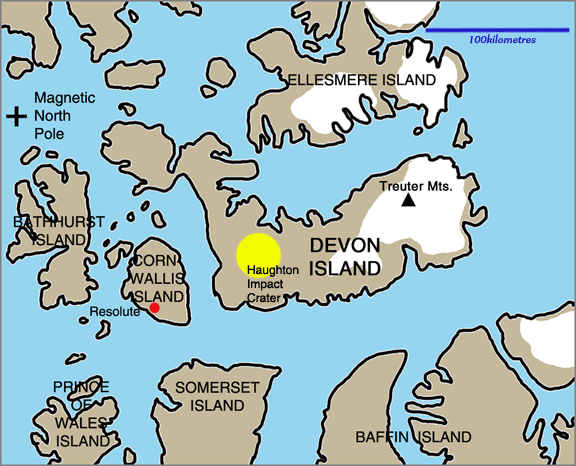
Devon Island and surroundings. Haughton crater also shown

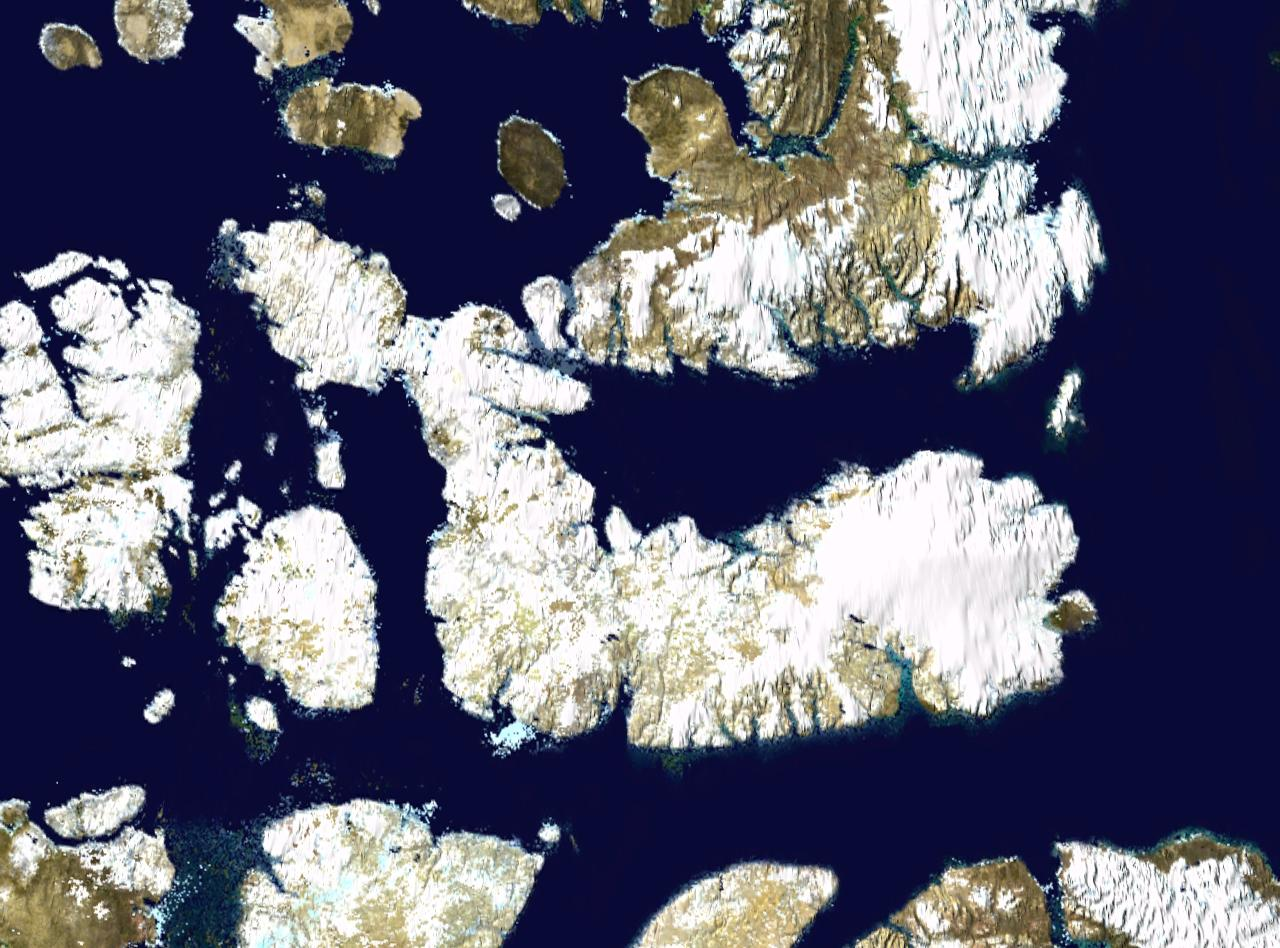
Devon island view

The station is located on Devon Island, a Mars analog environment and polar desert, approximately 165 kilometres (103 mi) north east of the hamlet of Resolute in Nunavut, Canada. The station is situated on Haynes Ridge, overlooking the Haughton impact crater, a 23 km (14 mi) diameter crater formed approximately 39 million years ago (late Eocene). The location is approximately 1,600 km (990 mi; 860 nmi) from the Geographic North Pole and approximately 1,500 km (930 mi; 810 nmi) from the Magnetic North Pole (as of 2010).

FMARS is the first research station of its kind to be built, completed in the summer of 2000.

Operated by the non-profit Mars Society, the station's mission is to help develop key knowledge needed to prepare for human Mars exploration, and to inspire the public by making real the vision of human exploration of Mars. The society uses the station to conduct geological and biological exploration under conditions similar to those found on Mars, to develop field tactics based on those explorations, to test habitat design features, tools, and technologies, and to assess crew selection protocols.

The project's final cost was US$1.3 million, raised through sponsorships with major companies. Flashline.com, an internet business, donated $175,000 and was granted the right to affix its name to the project. Other major sponsors included the Kirsch Foundation, the Foundation for the International Non-governmental Development of Space (FINDS) and the Discovery Channel (which purchased exclusive English-language TV rights to the station's activities for the first two years).

The FMARS project is one of four stations originally planned by the Mars Society as part of the Mars Analog Research Station Program. The Mars Desert Research Station (MDRS) began operation in 2002 in southern Utah. Stations to be built in Europe (European Mars Analog Research Station / EuroMARS) and Australia (Australia Mars Analog Research Station / MARS-Oz) have not progressed beyond the planning stages.

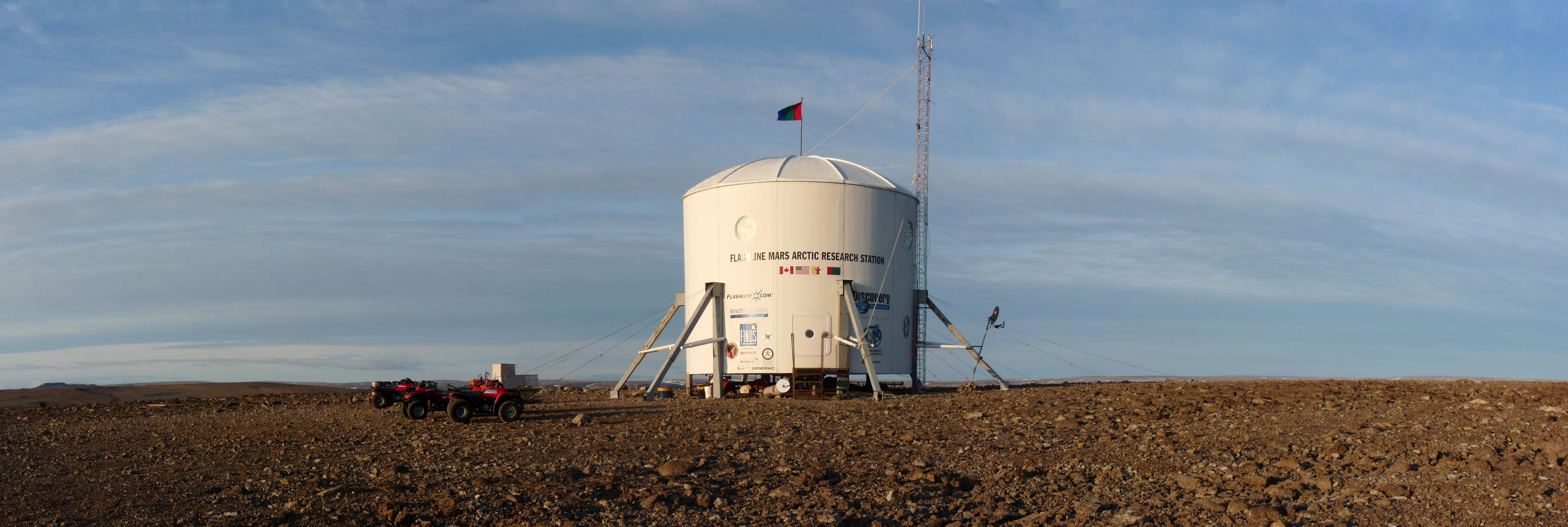
Flashline Mars Arctic Research Station (FMARS). Panorama taken in July 2009.

== Establishment of the station ==
The establishment of a human Mars exploration analog research station on Devon Island was first proposed by Pascal Lee in April 1998. The station was officially selected as the Mars Society's first project at the society's Founding Convention in August 1998.

The station was designed by architect Kurt Micheels and design engineer Wayne Cassalls in coordination with Robert Zubrin and numerous Mars Society volunteers.

Kurt Micheels and Robert Zubrin conducted a scouting expedition to Devon Island as part of the 1999 field season of NASA's Haughton Mars Project (HMP), in order to gain the information needed to plan operations and to determine an optimum site for station construction. An appropriate site was selected on a ridge overlooking the Haughton crater, which was named Haynes Ridge by Robert Zubrin in honor of the late Professor Robert Haynes of York University, a founding member of the Mars Society and seminal thinker on issues concerning the terraforming of Mars. Following this scouting expedition, Kurt Micheels was selected as the station's project manager.

The station's structure was fabricated between January 2000 and June 2000 by Infrastructures Composites International (Infracomp) under the direction of John Kunz, using a unique type of fiberglass honeycomb construction technology. The Mars Society provided Infracomp additional manpower from Mesa Fiberglass, Pioneer Astronautics and the Rocky Mountain Mars Society Chapter in order to meet the deadline for station deployment. The station's components were transported by truck to Moffett Field, California and loaded onto three C-130 aircraft operated by the U.S. Marine Corps 4th Air Delivery Battalion. The first C-130 departed Moffett Field headed for the arctic on July 1, 2000.

On July 3, 2000, the three C-130s, Kurt Micheels, John Kunz, and a paid team of construction workers were in Resolute. The construction team traveled to Devon Island via Twin Otters on July 4. On July 5 the Marines conducted five successful paradrops of station components. A sixth paradrop was also successful on July 8.

The seventh and final paradrop, conducted on July 8, was unsuccessful. The parachute separated from the payload at an altitude of 1000 feet. The payload contained a crane for use in constructing the station, a trailer intended to transport the station sections from their landing locations to the construction site, and the fiberglass floors for the structure. All were completely destroyed.

On July 12, Kurt Micheels and the construction crew left Devon Island and returned to Resolute, unable to find a way to continue station construction. Micheels later resigned as project manager on July 15.

The Mars Society engaged the services of Aziz Kheraj, the owner of Resolute's South Camp Inn. He flew to Devon Island on July 12 and assessed the situation. He would go on to provide critical support, equipment and materials that allowed construction of the station to proceed.

Frank Schubert, a Mars Society member who was a homebuilder by trade, had been sent to Resolute following the initial team. It was originally intended that he focus on the interior build-out of the station, but instead played a key role in erecting the structure and was appointed by Robert Zubrin as replacement project manager. He spent several days developing a new construction plan and was joined in Resolute by Zubrin on July 15. John Kunz also agreed to remain and assist the construction effort. Zubrin and Schubert flew to Devon Island later in the day on July 15. John Kunz flew back to Devon Island on July 16.

On July 17 parts were obtained from Resolute that were used to construct a crude replacement trailer. Enlisting the help of volunteers from HMP and members of a Japanese TV crew, six of the wall segments were transported from their landing location within the crater to the construction site.

The remainder of the habitat's components were transported to the construction site on July 18 and July 19. The existing volunteers were assisted by Joe Amarualuk and several Inuit high school students who also volunteered to help.

Matt Smola, the foreman of Frank Schubert's construction company in Denver, arrived on Devon Island on July 20 and assisted with station construction.

The station's wall sections were raised to vertical and connected to each other July 20 through July 22. The floors of the station were constructed out of wood and assembled on July 23 and July 24. The dome roof of the station was assembled July 24, 25 and 26th. This completed the exterior construction of the station.

Individuals from HMP, the Discovery Channel film team and a number of journalists on-site assisted with the interior build-out of the station, which was only partially completed. Finishing touches of the interior build-out would occur the following year.

A red, green and blue Martian tricolor flag was raised on the 28th atop the station.

An inauguration ceremony took place at 9PM on the 28th. Every human being on the island attended. This included approximately fifty scientists, Inuit, and journalists. Several individuals spoke. Robert Zubrin gave the concluding remarks and dedicated the station to those whose cause it will ultimately serve, a people who are yet to be, the pioneers of Mars. The station was christened by smashing a bottle of Canadian sparkling wine against it.

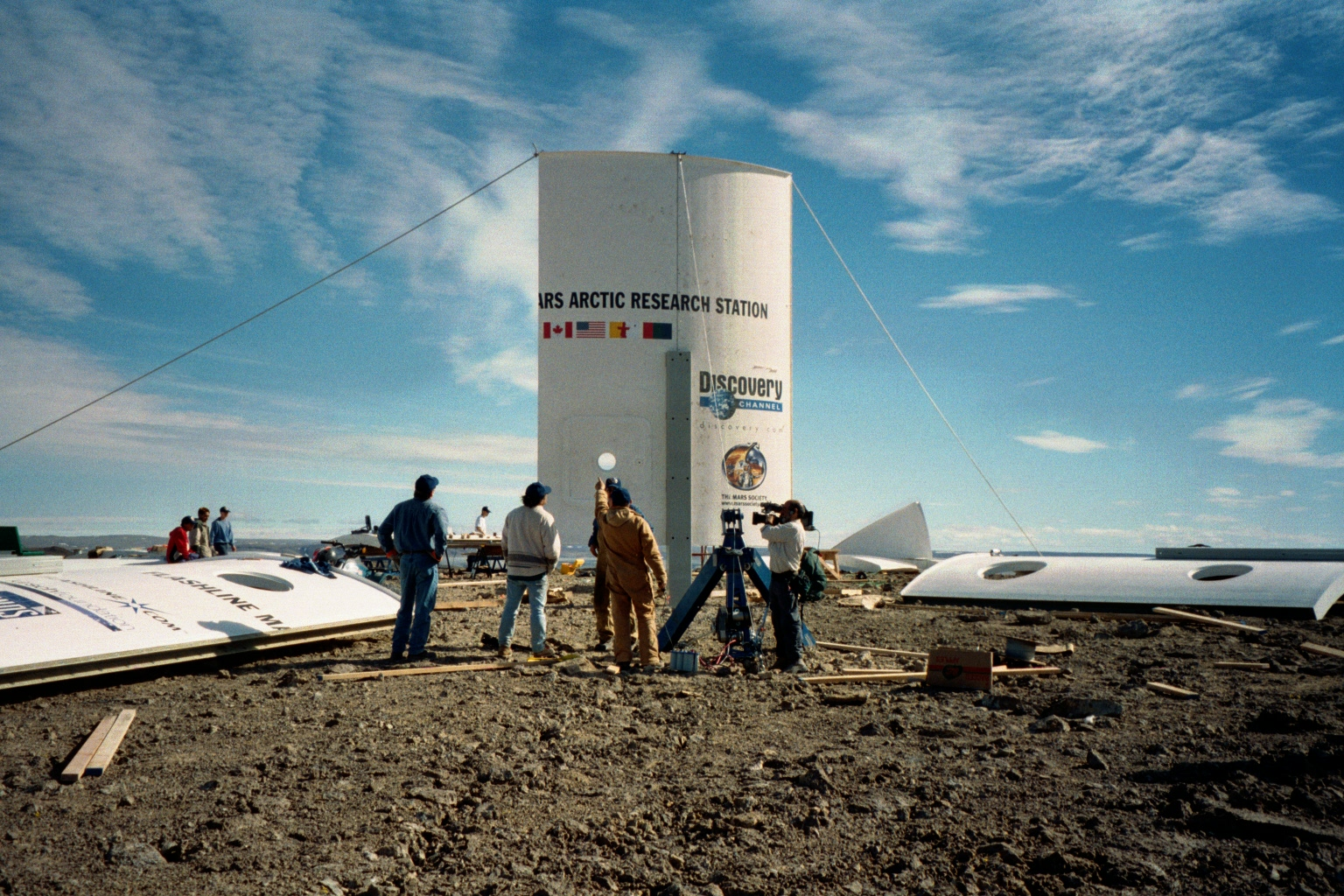
The first set of the station's wall panels are erected on July 20, 2000.

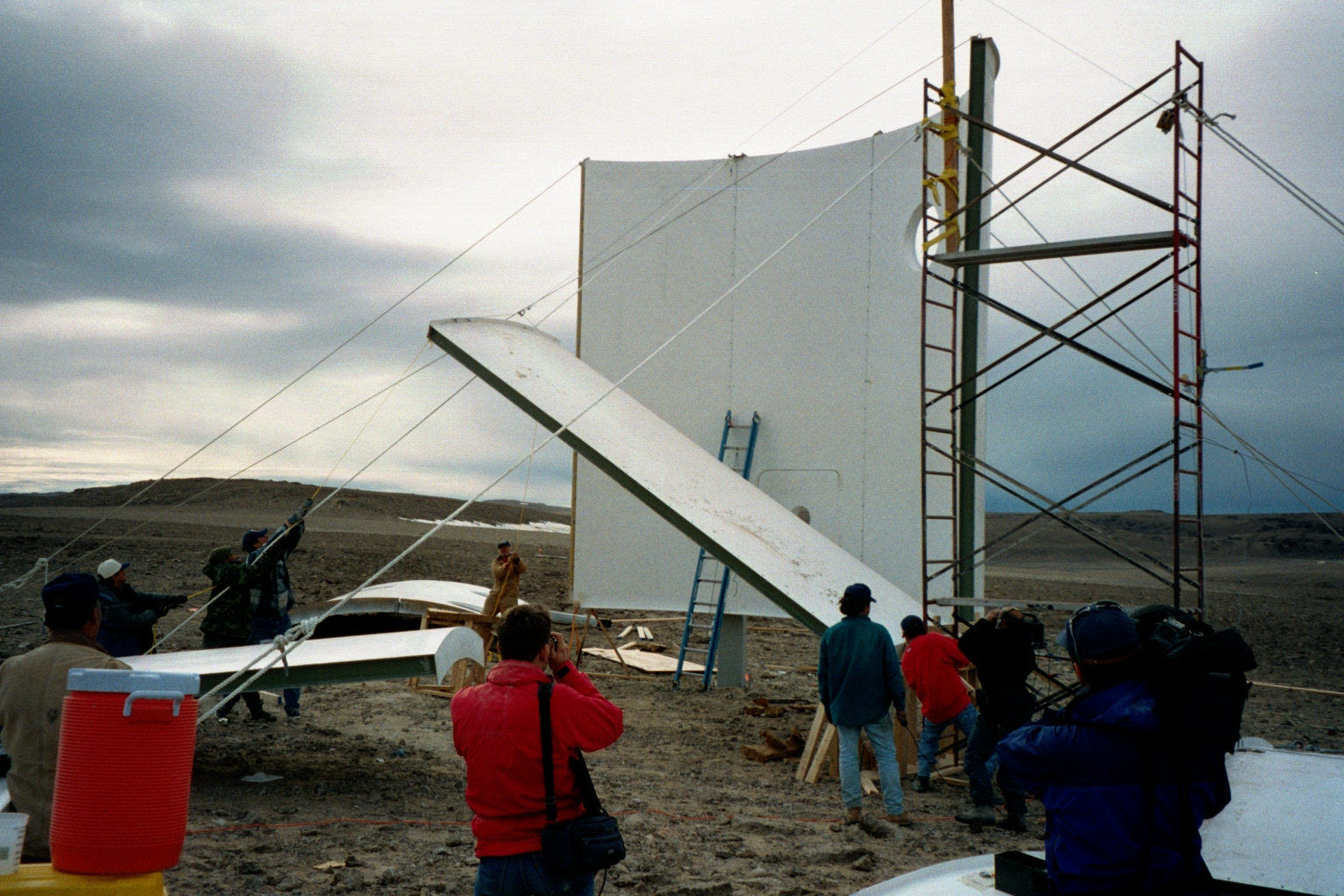
Volunteers use a scaffold to erect the walls of the station on July 21, 2000.

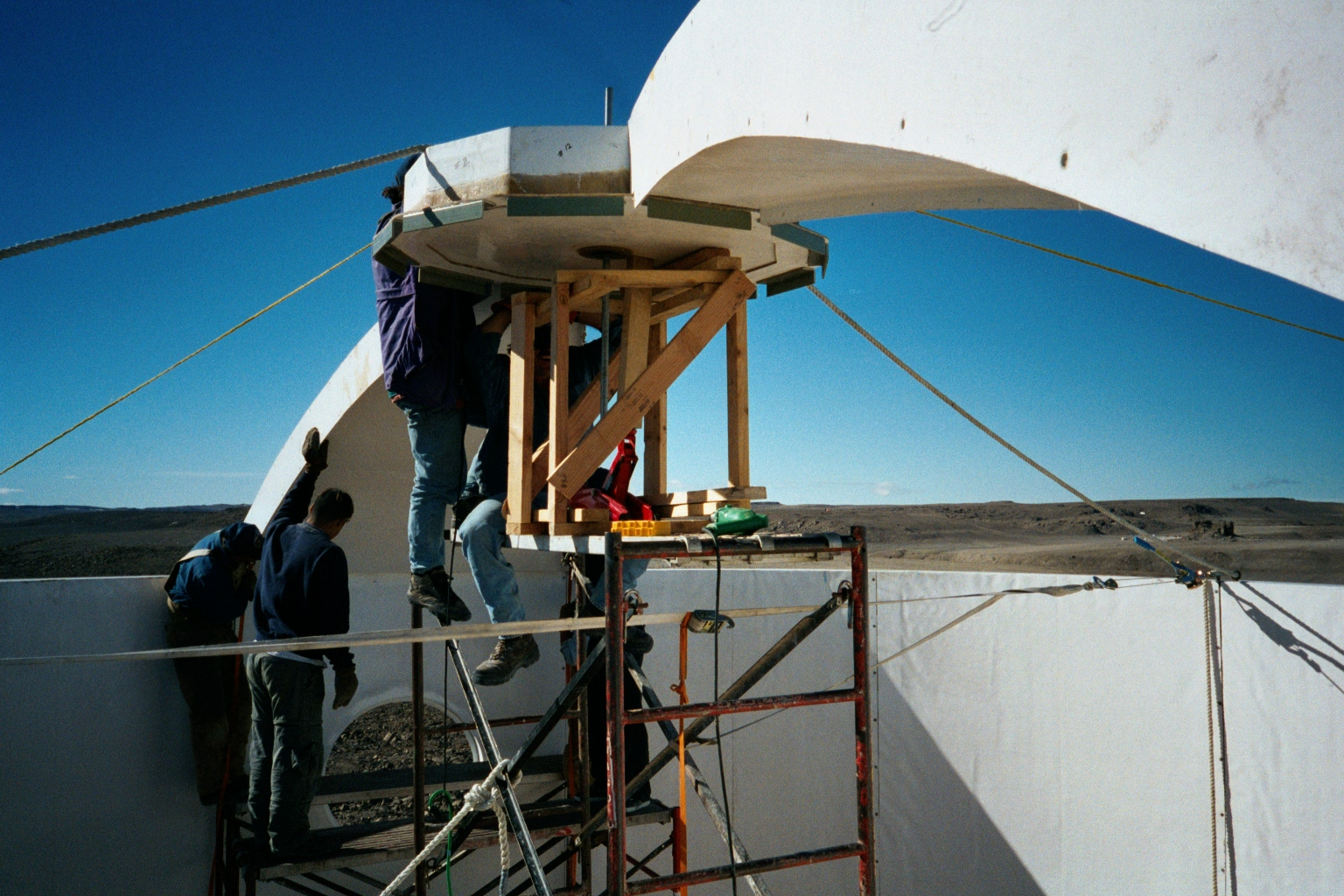
The station's roof dome arch is formed on July 25, 2000.

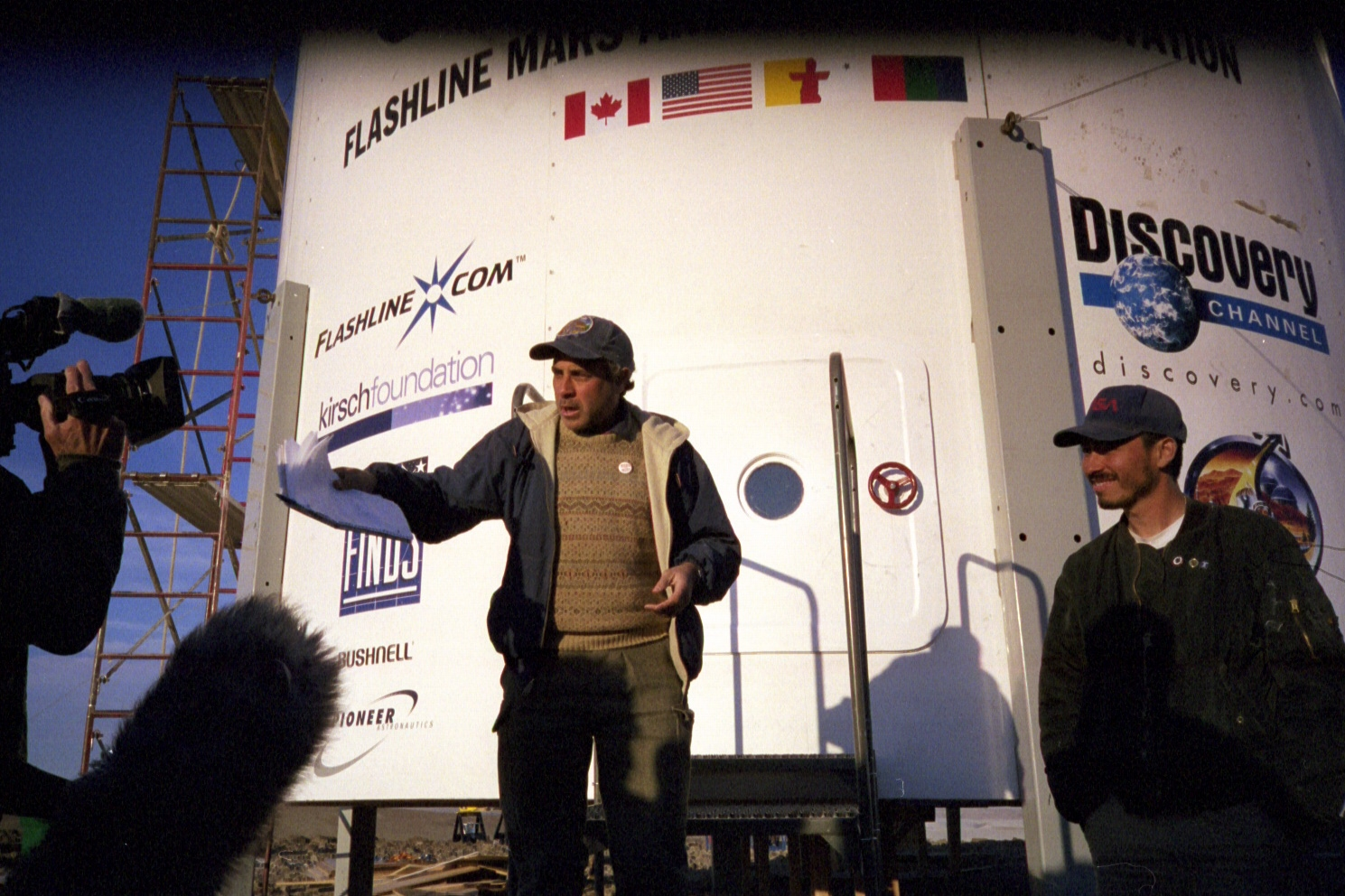
Robert Zubrin gives a speech at the commissioning of the station on July 28, 2000.

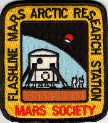
2000 FMARS Patch.

A symbolic first crew occupied the station the night of the 28th and during the day on the 29th. It consisted of Pascal Lee, Marc Boucher, Frank Schubert, Charles Cockell, Bob Nesson and Robert Zubrin.

Frank Schubert, Matt Smola and Robert Zubrin left Devon Island on the afternoon of the 29th.

A shakedown crew then occupied the station for four days. It was commanded by Dr. Carol Stoker, and included Larry Lemke, William Clancey, Darlene Lim, Marc Boucher, and Bob Nesson. The crew used a prototype Mars space suit supplied by Hamilton Sundstrand to conduct several EVAs, communications were established with the Mission Support group in Denver, and a list of items for correction, installation or improvement were identified with the habitat and its systems. This crew left Devon Island on August 4.

== Operations ==
The FMARS is a monocoque mostly made out of double-skinned wood panels. The habitat is stabilized by ground trusses and steel guy-wires, making the FMARS more stable than MDRS in high wind. The lower deck has more but smaller rooms, and the doors in the FMARS are square and tall. A ladder connects both floors together. The galley's and ladder's position are swapped compared to the MDRS, as well as the toilet and bathroom. The upper deck's shared space is used for both computing and dining, and the galley consists of a stove, microwave, and a water container. The crew quarter's rooms have staggered bunk beds and are not equal in volume. A nearby river a few hundred meters away provides freshwater, and a gas generator provides electricity.

Over time, there were drastic differences between the FMARS and MDRS, due to FMARS's more isolated location and MDRS's more continuous use, maintenance and expansion. The FMARS also needs to withstand the extreme wind and temperature in the Arctic. A participant of Mars 160 described the FMARS as more structurally sound, though more deteriorated due to dry rot and molds. Power and internet access was limited to a few hours per day and many pieces of equipment were broken because of poor maintenance.

The Mars Society sends researchers to live and work at the station typically for one month during the arctic summer. Each of these expeditions consists of a crew of between 6 and 7 individuals. Typically 1 to 2 months prior to departing for the Canadian Arctic, the crew gathers for an initial face-to-face meeting and training session in Colorado. Departing for the arctic, the crew travels by commercial airline to Resolute. There they spend a few days organizing their supplies and equipment and conducting some final training while waiting for clear weather. They then board Twin Otter aircraft for the final leg of the journey. These aircraft land on a dirt airstrip located on Devon Island near the station. The primary means of crew transportation while on the island is by All-Terrain Vehicles (ATVs).

During the formal Mars simulation period of each expedition, it is required that any outside work be done while wearing a simulated spacesuit and that all communications are conducted by radio. Space suited crew members use a simulated airlock depress/repress procedure upon each exit and entry to the habitat. Communications between the station and off-island researchers are subject to a time delay (typically 20 minutes) which mimics that of actual radio traffic between Earth and Mars. A satellite phone is kept on-site for use in emergencies.

Due to limited visibility of crew members wearing simulated spacesuits, all work outside the station is conducted with one crew member "out-of-sim". It is the responsibility of this crew member to be on the lookout for, and to protect the crew from polar bears. This crew member is typically armed with a pump-action shotgun loaded with slugs. The crew also carries bear deterrent devices known as bear bangers. No polar bears have yet been encountered by the crew of an FMARS expedition, although signs of their presence on the island are regularly seen, and at least one encounter has occurred with participants in the HMP.

Crew members are also required to write periodic reports to document conducted research, to advise on the status of engineering systems, and to capture details related to other aspects of operations. There are four reports that are typically generated, these being the Commander's Report, a Science Report, an Engineering Report and a Narrative Report. The crew transmits these reports to a Mission Support team (typically located in Colorado).

== Campus ==
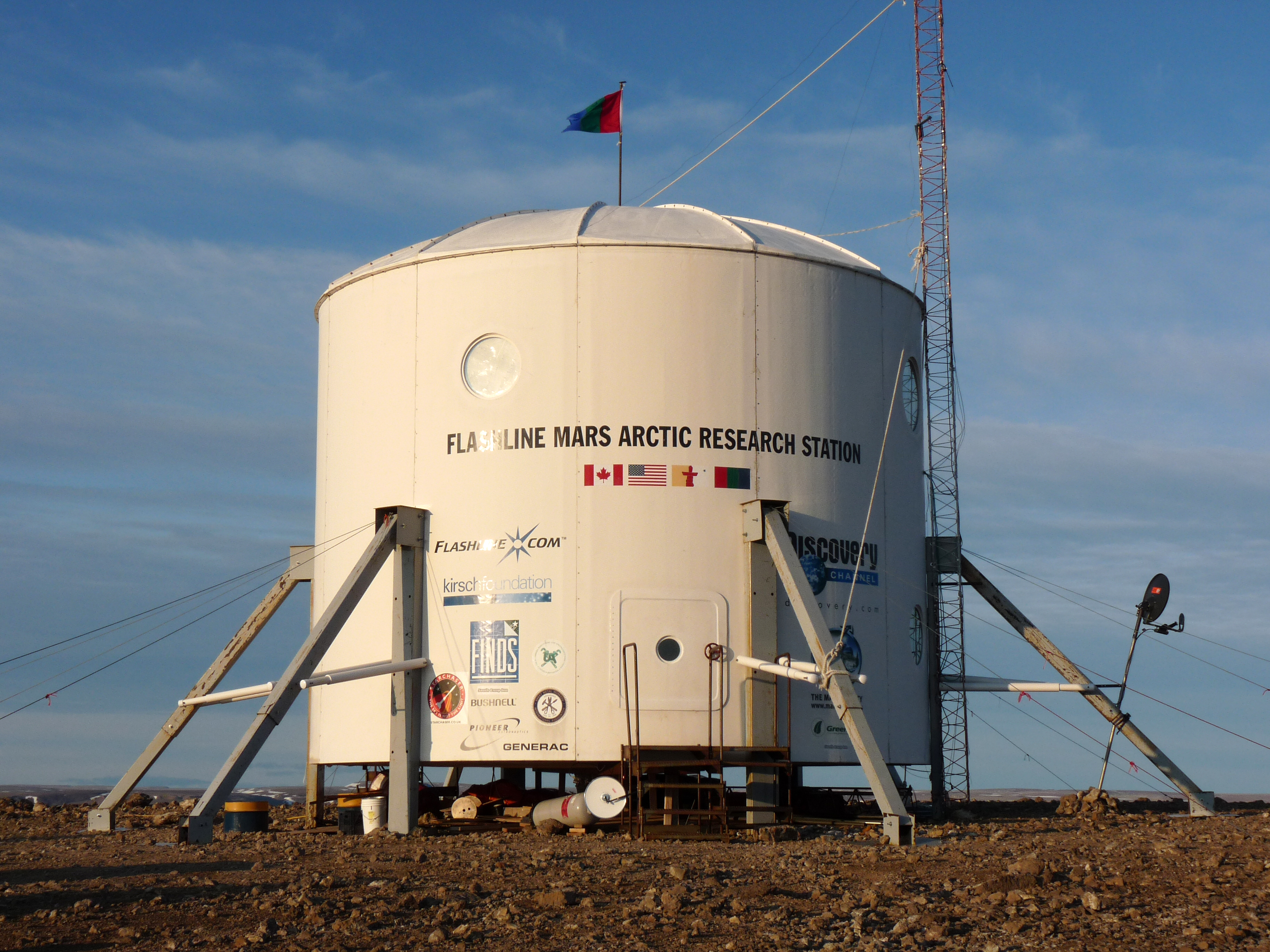
The FMARS Habitat (2009).

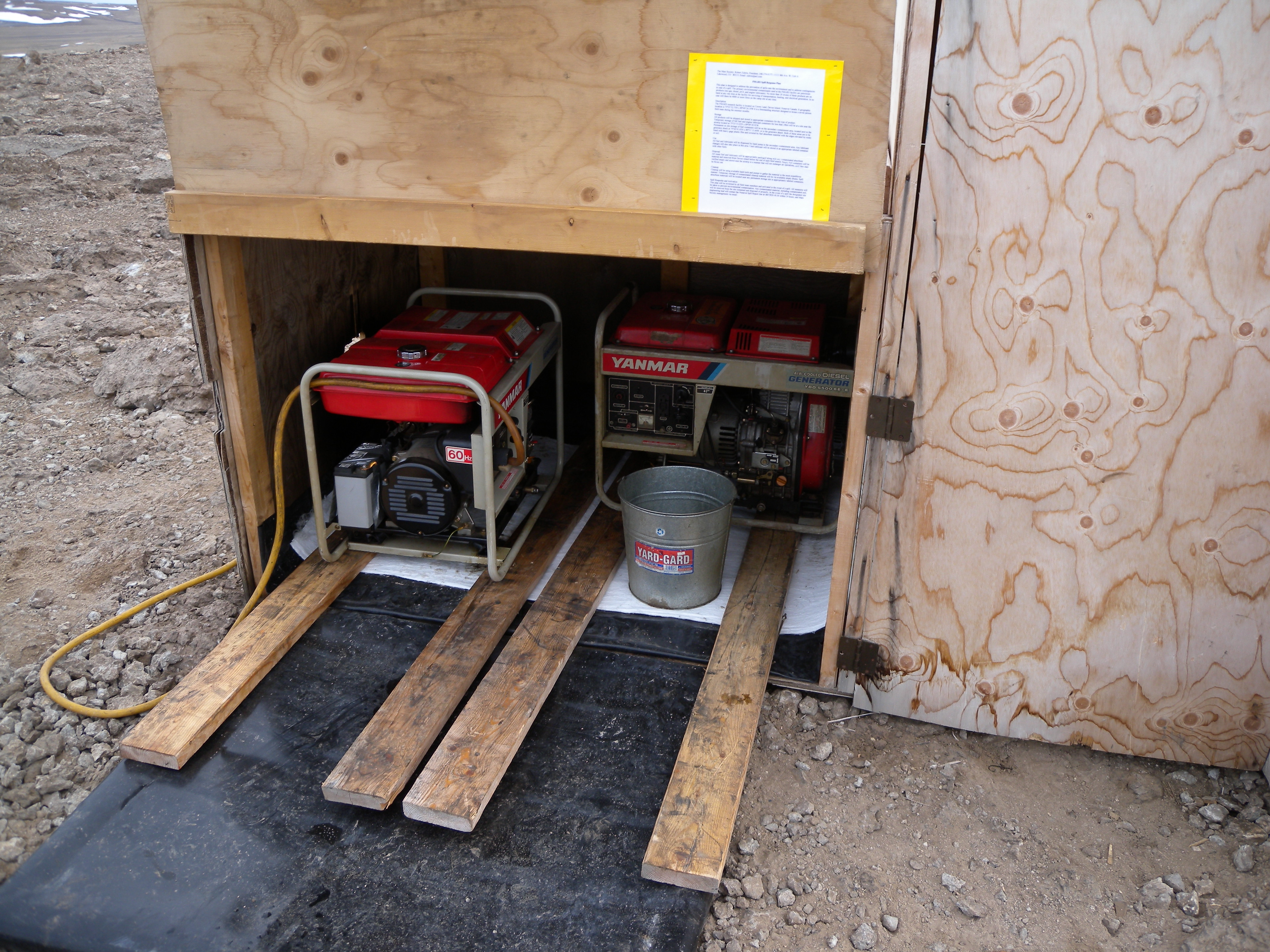
The generator shack at FMARS (2009).

The campus currently consists of two buildings, the habitat and the generator shack.

The habitat, commonly referred to as "the Hab", is a 7.7 metres (25 ft) tall cylinder that measures 8.3 metres (27 ft) in diameter and is used as the living area during simulation. Its basic size and design is based on the Mars Direct architecture. On the first floor there are two airlocks, a shower and toilet, a room for the space suits, and a combined lab and work area. On the second floor are six crew rooms with bunks, a common area, and a kitchen equipped with a gas stove, refrigerator, microwave, oven and a sink. There is also a loft area accessed by ladder from the second floor which provides storage space and can accommodate a bunk for a seventh crew member.

The generator shack is a small wooden structure located to the east of the habitat. It houses two diesel generators (primary and backup) which alternately provide power for the habitat.

Also on the campus is a greywater sump, a SmartAsh incinerator, secondary containment areas for storage of barrels of gasoline, diesel fuel, and waste oil, and a satellite dish that provides the station's internet connection.

== Bibliography ==
=== 2001 ===
- Pletser, Vladimir; Lognonne, Philippe; Diament, Michel; Dehant, Véronique (2009), "Subsurface water detection on Mars by astronauts using a seismic refraction method: Tests during a manned Mars mission simulation", Acta Astronautica, 64 (4): 457, Bibcode:2009AcAau..64..457P, doi:10.1016/j.actaastro.2008.07.005
- Alain Souchier. "Private ground infrastructures for space exploration missions simulations", ActaAstronautica66(2010)1580–1592.
- Clancey, William J. "Simulating "Mars on Earth" – A Report from FMARS Phase 2". In Zubrin, R. M.; Crossman, F. (eds.). On to Mars, Colonizing a New World. Apogee Books. CiteSeerX 10.1.1.8.2381.

==== Presentations ====
- Vladimir Pletser, Philippe Lognonne, Michel Diament, Véronique Dehant, Pascal Lee, and Robert Zubrin. "Subsurface Water Detection on Mars by Active Seismology: Simulation at the Mars Society Arctic Research Station", Conference on the Geophysical Detection of Water on Mars, 2001.
- Robert Zubrin. "The Flashline Mars Arctic Research Station: Dispatches from the First Year's Mission Simulation", AIAA 2002-0993 40th AIAA Aerospace Sciences Meeting and Exhibit, Reno, NV. January 14–17, 2002.
- Vladimir Pletser, Robert Zubrin, K. Quinn. "Simulation of Martian EVA at the Mars Society Arctic Research Station", Presented to World Space Congress, Houston, TX. October 2002.

=== 2003 ===
- Jan Osburg and Walter Sipes. "Mars Analog Station Cognitive Testing (MASCOT): Results of First Field Season", SAE-2004-01-2586.
- Robert Zubrin (2004). Mars on Earth: The Adventures of Space Pioneers in the High Arctic. Jeremy P. Tarcher/Penguin. ISBN 978-1-58542-350-7.

==== Presentations ====
- Jan Osburg. "Crew Experience at the ‘Flashline Mars Arctic Research Station’ during the 2003 Field Season", Proceedings of the 34th International Conference on Environmental Systems, Colorado Springs, CO, USA, July 2004, SAE-04ICES-31.
- Cockell, C.S., Lim, D.S.S., Braham, S, Lee, P., Clancey, B., "Exobiological protocol and laboratory for the human exploration of Mars: Lessons from a polar impact crater", Journal of the British Interplanetary Society, Vol 56, Num 3–4, pp. 74–86, 2003.
- W.J. Clancey. "Principles for integrating Mars Analog Science, Operations, and Technology Research", Workshop on analog sites and facilities for the human exploration of the Moon and Mars, Colorado School of Mines, Golden, CO. May 21–23, 2003

=== 2004 ===
- Held, J., Wynn, L., Reed, J., and R. Wang, "Supply requirement prediction during long-duration space missions using Bayesian estimation", International Journal of Logistics, Vol 10, Num 4, pp. 351–366, 2007.
- Wynn, L., Held, J., Kereszturi, A. and Reed, J., "The Geophysical Study Of An Earth Impact Crater As An Analogue For Studying Martian Impact Craters", published in On To Mars 2, edited by Zubrin, RM, and Crossman, F. Collector's Guide Publishing Inc. 2006 ed
- S. Sklar and S. Rupert. "A Field Methodology Approach Between an Earth-Based Remote Science Team and a Planetary-Based Field Crew", AAS 06-260, Mars Analog Research, Edited by Jonathan Clarke, Univelt, San Diego, 2006.

.

=== 2007 ===
- M. Bamsey, A. Berinstain, S. Auclair, M. Battler, K. Binsted, K. Bywaters, J. Harris, R. Kobrick, C. McKay. "Four-month Moon and Mars crew water utilization study conducted at the Flashline Mars Arctic Research Station, Devon Island, Nunavut", Advances in Space Research 43 (2009) 1256–1274.
- Binstead, K., Kobrick, R.L., Ogiofa, M., Bishop, S., Lapierre, J. (2010) Human factors research as part of a Mars exploration analogue mission on Devon Island, Planetary and Space Science, v58 (7–8), p 994–1006.
- Bishop, S.L, Kobrick, R., Battler, M., Binsted, K. (2010). FMARS 2007: Stress and coping in an arctic Mars simulation, Acta Astronautica, v 66 (9–10), p 1353–1367. doi:10.1016/j.actaastro.2009.11.008.

==== Presentations ====
- Sheryl L. Bishop, Ryan Kobrick, Melissa Battler and Kim Binsted. FMARS 2007: Stress and Coping in an Arctic Mars Simulation, 59th IAC Congress, Glasgow, Scotland, 29 September – 3 October 2008.

=== 2009 ===
- Shiro, B., J. Palaia, and K. Ferrone (2009). Use of Web 2.0 Technologies for Public Outreach on a Simulated Mars Mission, Eos Trans. AGU, 90(52), Fall Meet. Suppl., Abstract ED11A-0565, San Francisco, CA, USA.

=== 2010 ===
- Shiro, B. and C. Stoker (2010). Iterative Science Strategy on Analog Geophysical EVAs, NASA Lunar Science Forum 2010, 20–22 July, Moffett Field, CA, USA.
- Ferrone, K., S. Cusack, C. Garvin, V. W. Kramer, J. Palaia, and B. Shiro (2010). Flashline Mars Arctic Research Station (FMARS) 2009 Crew Perspectives, AIAA paper 2010–2258, In: Proceedings of the AIAA SpaceOps 2010 Conference, 25–30 April, Huntsville, AL, USA.
- Shiro, B. (May 13, 2010) In Situ Exploration by Humans in Mars Analog Environments. UND 997 Symposium.
- Shiro, B. and K. Ferrone (2010). In Situ Exploration by Humans in Mars Analog Environments, In: Proceedings of the 41st Lunar and Planetary Science Conference, 1–5 March, Abstract 2052, Houston, TX, USA.

=== Additional publications referencing work done at FMARS ===
- O. Sindiy, K. Ezra, D. DeLaurentis, B. Caldwell, T. McVittie, and K. Simpson (2010) Analogues Supporting Design of Lunar Command, Control, Communication, and Information Architectures. Journal of Aerospace Computing, Information, and Communication.
- O. Sindiy, K. Ezra, D. DeLaurentis, B. Caldwell, K. Simpson, and T. McVittie. (2009) Use of Analogous Projects for Trade Space Analysis for Lunar Command, Control, Communication, and Information Architectures. AIAA Infotech@Aerospace Conference, Seattle, WA.

== See also ==
- Colonization of Mars
- Haughton–Mars Project
- Human mission to Mars
- Life on Mars
- List of research stations in the Arctic
- Mars to Stay
- MARS-500
- Outline of space science
- Space colonization
