= Schutte =

Schutte is a German and Dutch occupational surname derived from schutter, meaning "archer". The North German form of the name is Schütte or Schuette.

• Slavic Variant: In some cases, it is a Germanized form of the Croatian and Slovenian surname Šute or Šutej.

• English Origin (Alternative): In England, the surname can also be a variant of Shute, which can mean an archer from Middle English schutte or a locational name from a Devonshire hamlet named from the Old English sceat ("hill" or "projection").

• Historical Variations: Common spelling variants include Schütte, Schutt, Schutter, Schut, and Schuetze

People with these names include:

== Schutte ==
- Alta Schutte, South African cardiology academic
- Arminda Schutte (1909–1995), Cuban classical pianist
- Bill Schutte (1910–1994), American football player and coach
- Carl Schutte (1887–1962), American road racing cyclist
- Clarence Schutte (1901–1970), American football player
- Dan Schutte (born 1947), American composer
- Dick Schutte (born 1947), Dutch politician
- Dieter Schütte (1923–2013), German publisher
- Edwin Schutte (1906–1985), American basketball coach and dentist
- Frits Schutte (1897–1986), Dutch swimmer
- Gert Schutte (1939–2022), Dutch politician
- Michael Schutte (born 1979), Canadian ice hockey player
- Mike Schutte (1950–2008), South African boxer and actor
- Nanette Schutte (born 1962), Dutch tennis player
- Loes Schutte (born 1953), Dutch rower
- Ofelia Schutte (born 1945), American philosopher
- Paul Schutte (born 1989), Irish hurler
- Sidney Schutte (born 1976), Dutch chef
- Thomas F. Schutte (1935–2025), American academic administrator, college president
- Xandra Schutte (born 1963), Dutch journalist

== Schütte ==
- Albrecht Schütte (born 1970), German politician
- Dieter Schütte (1923–2013), German publisher
- Friedhelm Schütte (born 1957), German footballer
- Gudmund Schütte (1872–1958), Danish philologist and historian
- Johann Schütte (1873–1940), German engineer, founder of the Schütte-Lanz airship and airplane company
- Jan Schütte (born 1957), German film director and screenwriter
- Kurt Schütte (1909–1998), German mathematician (namesake of Feferman–Schütte ordinal)
- Ludwig Schütte (1912–1993), German army officer during World War II
- Margarete Schütte-Lihotzky (1897–2000), Austrian architect
- Thomas Schütte (born 1954), German visual artist

== Schuette ==
- Bill Schuette (born 1953), American politician and attorney general of Michigan
- Bill G. Schuette, American politician
- Carl Schuette (1922–1975), American football player
- Charles Schuette (1878–1934), American Wisconsin state politician
- John Schuette (1837–1919), American Wisconsin state politician
- Kyrstin Schuette, American Minnesota state politician
- Paul Schuette (1906–1960), American football player
- Tom Schuette (1945–2024), Canadian football player
- William Schuette (1933–2002), American sprint canoer

== See also ==
- Schut, surname of the same origin
- Schutt, surname of German origin
- Schutte's Creek, a branch of the Stout Creek, Michigan
