= Frédéric Dieudonné =

French filmmaker

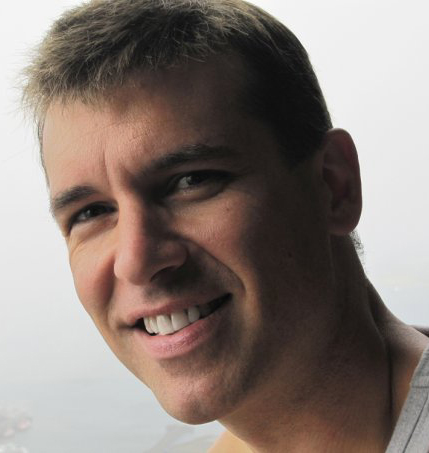
- Born: September 21, 1969 (age 55); France

Frédéric Dieudonné is a French writer, a filmmaker and a producer, environmentalist, and co-creator, with Jean-Christophe Jeauffre, of the Jules Verne Film Festival in 1992.

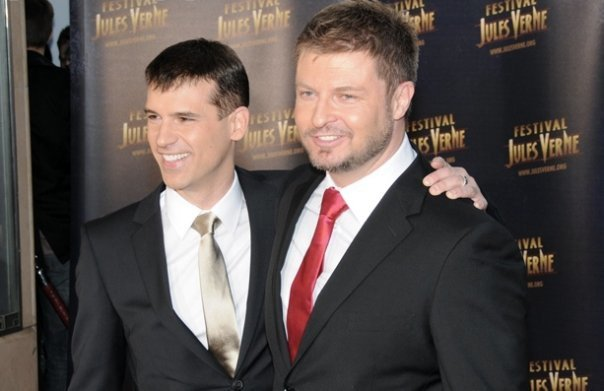
Frédéric Dieudonné and Jean-Christophe Jeauffre in 2009

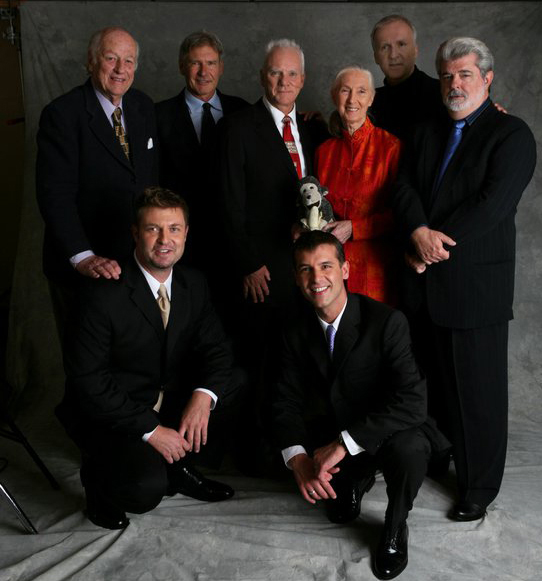
The Jules Verne Festival launch in Los Angeles, October 2006. L-R: Ray Harryhausen, Harrison Ford, Malcolm McDowell, Jane Goodall, James Cameron, George Lucas. Front: Jeauffre and Frédéric Dieudonné

== Education and early career ==
In 1986, Dieudonné graduated from high school and earned his Baccalauréat in Literature and Foreign Languages, with honours, at the age of 16.

He then was admitted at the Lycée Janson de Sailly of Paris, where he prepared for competitive entrance exams (Classe préparatoire aux grandes écoles) to L'École Normale Supérieure de la rue d'Ulm (Hypokhâgne and Khâgne). After earning a master's degree in Modern Literature, with honours, from the Sorbonne University of Paris in 1991, he founded the nonprofit Jules Verne Adventures the same year, along with Jean-Christophe Jeauffre.

== Jules Verne Festival ==
In 1992, Dieudonné and Jeauffre launched the annual Jules Verne Festival in Paris, inaugurated by Jacques-Yves Cousteau. This event, later also based in Los Angeles, is dedicated to exploration, education and conservation. Then they developed a production unit to create new adventure and exploration programs for television. The Jules Verne Festival was held each year in April at the Grand Rex theatre of Paris, Europe's largest movie theatre, where it attracted more than 35,000 visitors and guests.

In 2005 Dieudonné and Jean-Christophe Jeauffre founded the American version of the French nonprofit Jules Verne Adventures. It is based in Downtown Los Angeles and maintains an IRS 501(c)3 status. The inaugural American launch of the Los Angeles Jules Verne Festival (October 2006 at the Shrine Auditorium) has celebrated the work of George Lucas, Harrison Ford, Jane Goodall, and James Cameron, and attracted 6,300 attendees.

== Filmmaking ==
From 1999 on, Dieudonné co-produced several films for TV via Jules Verne Adventures, including Devil's Islands and Red and White.

A five-month expedition on the Atlantic aboard the tall ship Belem led to his production of several documentaries:

- Whales of Atlantis
- Amazon Trek (2008 Best Feature Documentary Award, White Sands International Film Festival, New Mexico)
- 100 Years Under the Sea
- Five Months on the Sea – the Jules Verne Expedition

Two fully illustrated books were also published after the expedition (Jean-Christophe Jeauffre (2003). L'expédition Jules Verne à bord du Trois-Mâts Belem (in French). Équinoxe. ISBN 978-2841353521. and Jean-Christophe Jeauffre (2002). Esquisses d'un voyage Amazonie-Martinique-Açores. Carnets d'ailleurs (in French). Michel Bez (illus.). Équinoxe. ISBN 9782841353460.).

In 2006, Dieudonné wrote, directed and co-produced theJules Verne Adventures]TV documentary Explorers: From the Titanic to the Moon, starring producer/director James Cameron and veteran Apollo 11 astronaut Buzz Aldrin.

All of the aforementioned films are now being distributed in the US on DVD and Blu-ray with narrations by Sir Christopher Lee and Ernest Borgnine.

The latest expedition he produced for the Mars Institute and NASA is the Northwest Passage Drive (2009–2010): the first motorized crossing of the Arctic Sea. As an executive producer and a consultant, Dieudonné is currently developing both a feature documentary called Passage to Mars and a Science Fiction feature film to be produced in Hollywood.

== Recognition ==
In 2014, Dieudonné was elected a Fellow of the Explorers Club, based in New York City.
