= Haughton impact crater =

Impact crater in Northern Canada

Haughton crater
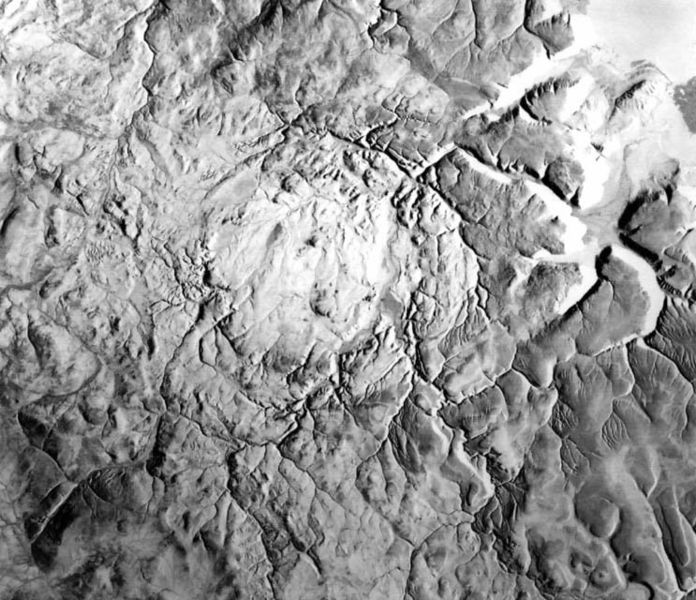
- Synthetic aperture radar image of Haughton crater

- Location within Canada
- Location: Devon Island, Nunavut, Nunavut, Canada; 75°23′N 89°40′W

Impact crater structure
- Confidence: Confirmed
- Diameter: 23 km (14 mi)
- Age: 32-31 Ma; Oligocene
- Exposed: Yes
- Drilled: No

Haughton impact crater is located on Devon Island, Nunavut in far Northern Canada. It is about 23 km (14 mi) in diameter and was formed 31–32 million years ago during the Early Oligocene. The impacting object is estimated to have been approximately 2 km (1.2 mi) in diameter. Devon Island itself is composed of Paleozoic shale and siltstone overlying gneissic bedrock. When the crater formed, the shale and siltstone were peeled back to expose the basement; material from as deep as 1,700 m (5,600 ft) has been identified.

== Name ==
In 1955, the Geological Survey of Canada recorded the structure—then believed to be a "piercement"—as part of Operation Franklin. Field geologist H. R. Greiner named it Haughton Dome after Samuel Haughton because of the latter's work in geology of the Arctic.

== Description ==
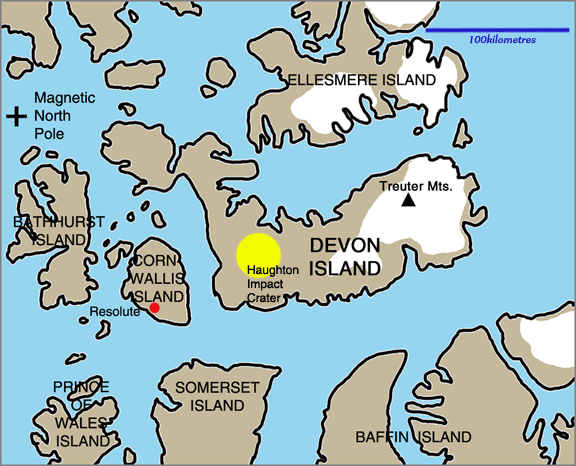
Location on Devon Island

At 75° north latitude, it is one of the highest-latitude impact craters known. The temperature is below the freezing point of water for much of the year, and the limited vegetation is slow-growing, leading to very little weathering. For this reason Haughton retains many geological features that lower-latitude craters lose to erosion.

Because Haughton's geology and climatology are as close to Mars-like as can be had on Earth, Haughton and its environs have been dubbed by scientists working there as "Mars on Earth". For example, the centre of the crater contains impact breccia (ejected rock which has fallen back into the impact zone and partially re-welded) that is permeated with permafrost, thus creating a close analogue to what may be expected at crater sites on a cold, wet Mars. The Mars Institute and the SETI Institute operate the Haughton–Mars Project at this site, designed to test many of the challenges of life and work on Mars. The non-profit Mars Society also operates the Flashline Mars Arctic Research Station (FMARS) at this site and conducts similar research.

== Sedimentary basin and fossils ==
The western-central part of the structure is partially filled by a post-impact sedimentary basin with a geological unit called the Haughton Formation composed of mudstone and siltstone, which reaches a maximum thickness of 48 metres (157 ft), that contains fossils of animals and plants, that lived in the region during the Early Miocene, around 24-21 million years ago. At this time, the region had a cool temperate climate, with the Haughton Formation being deposited in a large lake formed by the crater, which was surrounded by a forest including pine, hazel, birch and alder, with lesser amounts of larch, cypress and elm. Animal fossils found in the Haughton Formation include the early seal-relative Puijila darwini, a shrew belonging to the extinct subfamily Heterosoricinae resembling Domnina, a leporid rabbit resembling Desmatolagus, an artiodactyl of uncertain affinities, the primitive rhinoceros Epiaceratherium, an indeterminate swan, a trout (Eosalmo) and a smelt (cf. Osmerus).
