= Jules Verne Awards =

French environmental film awards

Jules Verne Award
- Awarded for: Excellence in exploration, environmental and cinematic achievements
- Country: France, United States
- Presented by: Jules Verne Adventures
- First award: 1992
- Website: julesverne.org

The Jules Verne Awards were a set of annual film awards, awarded from 1992 to 2012 in Paris, France. The awards are for "celebrating achievements in arts, exploration, and conservation, in the tradition of French writer Jules Verne".

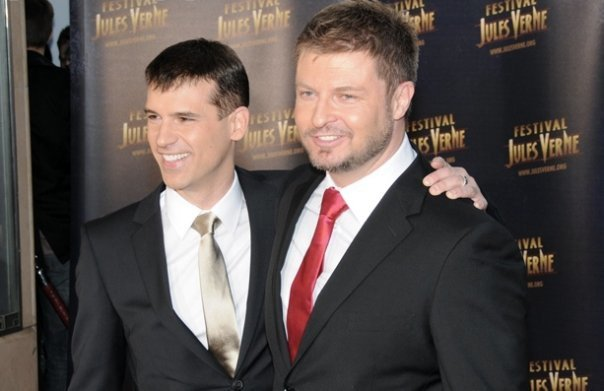
Frédéric Dieudonné and Jean-Christophe Jeauffre in 2009

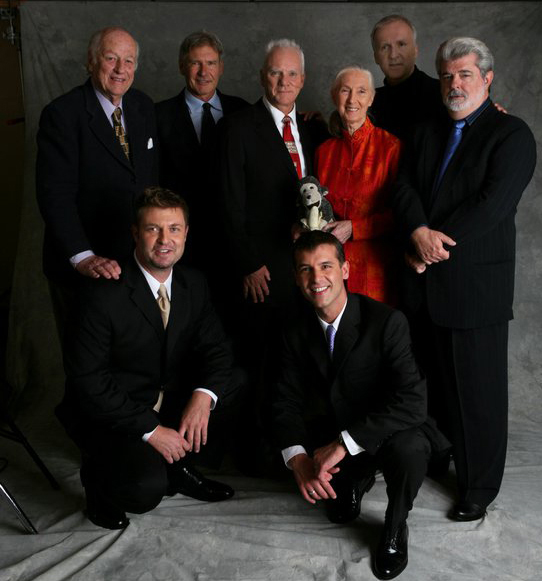
The Jules Verne Festival launch in Los Angeles, October 2006. L-R: Ray Harryhausen, Harrison Ford, Malcolm McDowell, Jane Goodall, James Cameron, George Lucas. Front: Jeauffre and Frédéric Dieudonné

== History ==
The awards were created in 1992 by filmmaker/environmentalists Jean-Christophe Jeauffre and Frédéric Dieudonné, the two founders of the Jules Verne Festival (Festival du Film Jules Verne Aventures (JVAFF)) and also known as the Jules Verne Film Festival, The awards were organized and overseen by the Jules Verne Adventures organization. They were first given in 1992 at the first Jules Verne Film Festival, which took place at the Institut océanographique de Paris.

In December 2007, the festival came to Los Angeles. This edition of the festival was known as the Jules Verne Adventure Film Festival. It was held in LA again the following year in October, at The Edison and The ImaginAsian Center.

The Jules Verne Festival traditionally includes an awards ceremony during which selected explorers, environmentalists, filmmakers, and movie stars are presented with the Jules Verne Award. Among others, the Jules Verne Award was given to Gérard Depardieu, Catherine Deneuve, Jean-Pierre Jeunet, Charlotte Rampling, Claude Lelouch, Johnny Depp, Christopher Lee, Patrick Stewart, Mark Hamill, Buzz Aldrin, William Shatner, Tippi Hedren, Stan Lee, Ray Bradbury, Ted Turner, Richard Dean Anderson, Larry Hagman, Christopher Reeve, Roy E. Disney, Tony Curtis, Ernest Borgnine, Steve McQueen, TV series Heroes, Lost, Stargate SG1 and Battlestar Galactica cast and crew, and has celebrated movie classics such as Blade Runner, Star Trek, Superman, Forbidden Planet, Alfred Hitchcock's The Birds, 2001: A Space Odyssey, Planet of the Apes, Some Like It Hot and The Wild Bunch.

== Categories ==
The Jules Verne Awards are given in several categories. As they are designed "to promote the spirit of human adventure and of curiosity, exploration, conservation and to create a gate to imagination through education and entertainment", they are awarded to both feature fiction and documentary films and filmmakers.

=== Legendaire ===
The Jules Verne Legendaire Awards celebrate legendary science fiction or adventure movies, TV series and stars. Among others, they have been given to: Star Wars Episode IV: A New Hope, The Empire Strikes Back, Blade Runner, Alfred Hitchcock's The Birds, 2001: A Space Odyssey, The Wild Bunch, Planet of the Apes, Smallville, Heroes, Lost, Battlestar Galactica, Stargate SG-1, John Wayne, Steve McQueen, Tony Curtis, Ernest Borgnine, Mark Hamill, Sir Christopher Lee, etc. The Jules Verne Legendaire Awards celebrations invite the Stars and the public to once-in-a-lifetime stage reunions of the original cast and crews.

=== Achievement ===
The Jules Verne Achievement Awards distinguish artists, explorers, filmmakers, movie and TV actors and celebrities who have encouraged the spirit of adventure and imagination, as well as open-mindedness through their talent, work and persistence. Dame Jane Goodall, George Lucas, James Cameron, Jacques-Yves Cousteau, Buzz Aldrin, Christopher Reeve, Harrison Ford, Tippi Hedren, Larry Hagman, Omar Sharif and Ray Bradbury rank among the recipients of the Jules Verne 'Achievement' Award.

=== Best documentaries ===
The Jules Verne Awards for best documentaries go to the best exploration, adventure, environment and wildlife documentaries of the year.

== Awards ceremonies ==
The following is a listing of some Jules Verne Awards ceremonies and recipients.

| Ceremony | Year | Recipient(s) | Movie(s) or TV series celebrated | Venue |
|---|---|---|---|---|
| 1st Jules Verne Awards | 1992 | Jacques-Yves Cousteau | The Silent World | Institut océanographique, Paris |
| 2nd Jules Verne Awards | 1993 | Alain Bombard | — | Institut océanographique, Paris |
| 3rd Jules Verne Awards | 1994 | Paul-Émile Victor | — | Institut océanographique, Paris |
| 4th Jules Verne Awards | 1995 | Éric Tabarly | — | Institut océanographique, Paris |
| 5th Jules Verne Awards | 1996 | Michel Navratil Jr | — | Institut océanographique, Paris |
| 6th Jules Verne Awards | 1997 | Pierre Schoendoerffer | Le Crabe-tambour | Institut océanographique, Paris |
| 7th Jules Verne Awards | 1998 | Christiane Desroches Noblecourt, Jacques Piccard | — | Institut océanographique, Paris |
| 8th Jules Verne Awards | 1999 | Ray Harryhausen, Kirk Douglas, Bertrand Piccard | — | Institut océanographique, Paris |
| 9th Jules Verne Awards | 2000 | Patrick Wayne, the Blackfoot Confederacy, John Scott (composer) | — | Institut océanographique, Paris |
| 10th Jules Verne Awards | 2001 | Thor Heyerdahl, Charlotte Rampling | — | Institut océanographique, Paris |
| 11th Jules Verne Awards | 2002 | Jean-Pierre Jeunet | — | Institut océanographique, Paris |
| 12th Jules Verne Awards | 2004 | James Cameron, Christopher Reeve, Dame Jane Goodall | Titanic, Ghosts of the Abyss, Expedition: Bismarck | Le Grand Rex |
| 13th Jules Verne Awards | 2005 | Tony Curtis, Omar Sharif, Allison Mack, Erica Durance, Jeph Loeb | Star Wars Episode IV: A New Hope, Aliens of the Deep, Smallville | Le Grand Rex |
| 14th Jules Verne Awards | 2006 | Sir Christopher Lee, Ernest Borgnine, Paul Walker, Frank Marshall, George Lucas, Harrison Ford | Eight Below | Le Grand Rex, Shrine Auditorium |
| 15th Jules Verne Awards | 2007 | Claude Lelouch, Lalo Schifrin, Sir Patrick Stewart, Tim Kring, Zachary Quinto, Ted Turner, Stan Lee, Tippi Hedren, William Shatner, Ray Bradbury, Buzz Aldrin | Star Trek: The Original Series, Blade Runner, Heroes | Le Grand Rex, Shrine Auditorium, Los Angeles Theatre |
| 16th Jules Verne Awards | 2008 | Louis de Funès, Robert Hossein, Roy E. Disney, Ron Moore | Planet of the Apes, 2001: A Space Odyssey, The Birds, Battlestar Galactica | Le Grand Rex, The Edison |
| 17th Jules Verne Awards | 2009 | Gérard Depardieu, Damon Lindelof, Carlton Cuse, Sam Peckinpah, Jerry Fielding, Ernest Borgnine, Mary McDonnell, Jamie Bamber, James Callis | Star Trek (2009 film), Coraline, Battlestar Galactica, The Wild Bunch, Some Like It Hot, Lost | Le Grand Rex, Million Dollar Theater |
| 18th Jules Verne Awards | 2010 | Mark Hamill, George Lucas, Steve McQueen | The Empire Strikes Back, Bullitt | Le Grand Rex, Cinerama Dome |
| 19th Jules Verne Awards | 2011 | John Wayne | True Grit | Cinerama Dome |
| 20th Jules Verne Awards | 2012 | Richard Dean Anderson, Amanda Tapping, Jacques Perrin, David Newman (composer) | Stargate SG-1 | Le Grand Rex |
| Ceremony | Year | Recipient(s) | Movie(s) or TV series celebrated | Venue |

== See also ==
- Prix Jules-Verne
