= Schut =

Schut is a Dutch occupational surname derived from schutter, meaning "archer". Notable people with the surname include:

- Alje Schut (born 1981), Dutch footballer
- Anoushka Schut-Welkzijn (born 1969), Dutch politician
- Ans Schut (1944–2025), Dutch speed skater
- Cornelis Schut (1597–1655), Flemish Baroque painter
- Cornelis Schut III (c. 1629–1685), Flemish painter active in Spain
- Lisa Schut (born 1994), Dutch chess player
- Lukáš Schut (born 1985), Czech footballer
- Wim Schut (1920–2006), Dutch government minister

Bakker Schut

- Frits Bakker Schut (1903–1966), Dutch civil engineer who drew the Bakker-Schut Plan of annexation of German territory after World War ||
- Pieter Bakker Schut (1941–2007), Dutch lawyer

== See also ==
- Schutt, a surname of the same origin
- Schutte, a surname of the same origin
- Vladislav Shoot (born 1941), British-Russian composer (Wladislaw Schut in German transliteration)
- Yana Shut (born 1997), Belarusian snooker and pool player (Jana Schut in German transliteration)
