= Pavilion Lake Research Project =

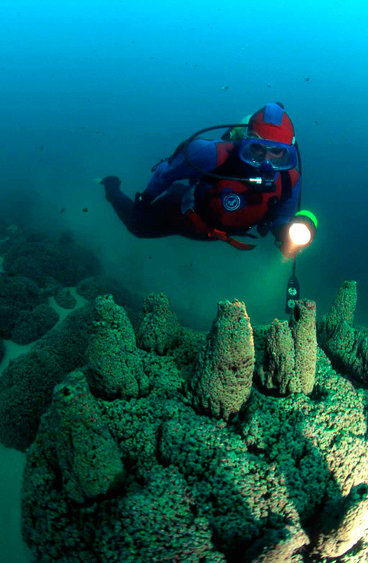
Microbialite towers with NASA research diver, 50 - 60 feet deep in Pavilion Lake.

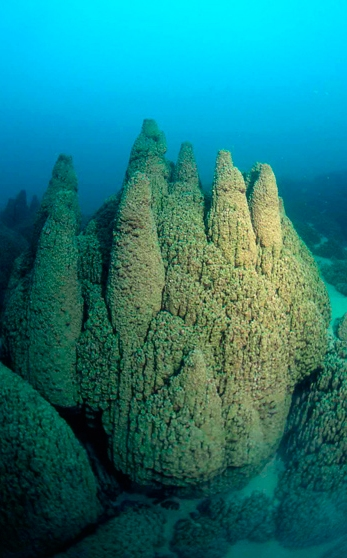
Pavilion Lake microbialite towers

The Pavilion Lake Research Project (PLRP) is an international, multi-disciplinary, science and exploration effort to explain the origin of freshwater microbialites (similar to stromatolites) in Pavilion Lake, British Columbia, Canada.

== History ==
After a successful initial field season at the lake in 2004, Dr. Darlene Lim (SETI/NASA Ames Research Center) established the Pavilion Lake Research Project (PLRP) in partnership with Dr. Bernard Laval (University of British Columbia). In 2005, PLRP acquired support from the Canadian Space Agency's (CSA) Canadian Analog Research Network (CARN) program, which has allowed the research program to flourish and evolve. The project also successfully acquired a National Geographic Research and Exploration Grant in 2005, and NASA continues to provide logistics, and education and public outreach (E/PO) support to the PLRP mission.

== Analogue studies ==
In addition to exploring the microbiolites of the lake, the PLRP is also an analogue testbed, a place to test out operations and procedures to better understand how to explore using humans on other worlds, while maximizing the amount of science that can be done under difficult conditions. While the lake is not a close physical analog to the Moon or Mars or an asteroid, the complex operations of the field team and back room in dealing with communications, power, safety, etc., make the project an excellent operational analog. The project's field research demands the seamless integration of science and exploration field activities in an underwater environment inherently hostile to humans. The physical, mental and operational rigors associated with PLRP field science and exploration activities are comparable to lunar and martian extra-vehicular activities (EVA) where scientific exploration is a key driver.

For the last several field seasons, the PLRP has used Deepworker submersibles to enable the scientists to map and explore the deepest parts of the lake, and cover much more area underwater than was previously possible with scuba divers. Deepworker is equipped with HD video cameras, so the scientists who make observations underwater can compare their observations with back room scientists after their dive, and a sampling arm, allowing microbialite retrieval from the deepest depths of the lake. While the operating environment is different, the Deepworkers share much in common with the Space Exploration Vehicles (SEV) that NASA is testing through the Desert Research and Technology Studies (Desert RATS) analog work. In fact, each year astronauts participate in the studies as scientist-pilots. In 2010, Chris Hadfield and Stan Love participated.
