= SHAD (summer program) =

Youth organization based in Canada

Shad Canada
- Founded: December, 1980
- Founder: Dr. Derek Lane-Smith
- Type: Registered charity
- Location: Waterloo, Ontario, Canada
- Region served: Primarily Canada
- Key people: Tim Jackson (President & CEO)
- Website: www.shad.ca

Shad Canada (formerly known as Shad Valley) is an annual Canadian summer enrichment program for high-achieving high school students in July. The program is open to both Canadian and international students. The program is offered at 21 participating universities across Canada.

Shad focuses on both academic learning through lectures, workshops, labs and group projects as-well as the development of an individual and community. These experiences are usually focused on the areas of science, technology, engineering, arts, and/or mathematics (STEAM).

There is a rigorous application process, which goes in-depth into both the students' academics and extra-curriculars. In 2020, over 2,400 students applied. Shad normally runs for four weeks in July. However, due to the COVID-19 pandemic, SHAD has been hosted online during the summer of 2020 and the summer of 2021.

== History ==
The Shad program was founded by Dr. Derek Lane-Smith, a teacher, physicist, and entrepreneur. The first summer program ran at St. Andrew's College in Aurora, Ontario in July, 1981, and has since expanded to 19 university campuses across Canada. The program is named after the shad, a kind of fish found in Shad Creek, near Aurora.

Shad Canada is a non-profit organization based in Waterloo, Ontario. Tim Jackson is the current President and CEO of Shad Canada.

== Shad Program ==
During the month, Shads participate in various activities including lectures, workshops, labs, group projects, recreational activities and more. Shads also participate in a Real-World Design Project. In the project, Shads are presented with the current year's theme and propose a solution. A ‘Shad’ is the recognition of the ambition, drive collaboration inherent in a Shad program graduate. This special recognition opens the door into the alumni network of 19,000+ Shads. The Shad Network is as diverse as its program and includes founders and CEOs, international academics, social entrepreneurs, healthcare professionals, best-selling authors, and AI innovators. The network has a range of participants at various stages of career and business success—from start-up to million-dollar organizations, Rhodes Scholars and university, and philanthropists and social entrepreneurs.

At the end of the program, each Shad campus hosts an event known as "Open Day", attended by parents and friends of the Shads at the campus.

== Real-World Design Project ==
Each year, Shad presents a "Real-World Design Project" to its participants. The project's "theme", usually an important issue that has both economic and societal implications and differs each year, is revealed to all of the Shad participants in the first week of the program. The project is to be completed in teams before the program's end. Each group must plan and design a product or service that addresses the issue at hand, create a working prototype and business plan, and pitch their product in a process intended to simulate an entrepreneurial experience.

The theme for 2023 was "How might we re-imagine living spaces for Canadians in ways that increase sustainability, accessibility, and community connection?". The theme for 2022 was "How might we improve the well-being of Canadians?". The theme for 2020 was "How might we leverage space as a creative research platform to advance humankind?". The theme for 2019 was "How might we help Canadians impactfully reduce waste?" The 2018 theme was "Helping Canadian communities become more resilient against natural disaster," and was revealed via a video message from NASA and Canadian astronaut Andrew J. Feustel.

Previous themes have included: "Disaster & Emergency Preparedness" (2004), "Health & Wellness" (2005), "The Great Canadian Energy Challenge" (2006), "Zero Waste Technology" (2007), "Design with Conscience" (2008), "Nature and Natural Fibres" (2009), "Designing for Canada's Aging Population" (2010), "Improving the Quality of Life for a Canadian Child with a Disability" (2011), and "Preventing/Reducing Obesity in North American Youth" (2012),"Why don't you go play outside?" (Why aren't youth playing outdoors?, 2015), "How might we improve food security for Canadians?" (2016), "Meaningfully reducing Canada’s energy footprint" (2017), "Helping Canadian communities become more resilient against natural disaster" (2018), "How might we help Canadians impactfully reduce waste?" (2019), "How might we leverage space as a creative research platform to advance humankind?" (2020), "How might we help Canadians treat our fresh water with more respect?" (2021), "How might we re-imagine living spaces for Canadians in ways that increase sustainability, accessibility, and community connection?" (2023).

== Host universities ==
=== Current ===
There are currently 24 Shad campuses:

- Athabasca University in Athabasca, Alberta (hosting a virtual Shad program) (since 2023)
- Carleton University in Ottawa, Ontario (since 1989)
- Dalhousie University in Halifax, Nova Scotia (since 2001)
- Lakehead University in Thunder Bay, Ontario (since 1999)
- Laurentian University in Sudbury (since 2020)
- Memorial University of Newfoundland in St. John's, Newfoundland and Labrador (since 2003)
- McGill University in Montreal, Quebec (since 2018)
- McMaster University in Hamilton, Ontario (since 1998)
- Mount Allison University in Sackville, New Brunswick (since 2018)
- Ontario Tech University in Oshawa, Ontario (since 2022)
- Queen's University in Kingston, Ontario (2004-2019, since 2004)
- St. Francis Xavier University in Antigonish, Nova Scotia (since 2026)
- Toronto Metropolitan University in Toronto, Ontario (since 2017)
- University of British Columbia in Vancouver, British Columbia (since 1986)
- University of Calgary in Calgary, Alberta (1984-2008, since 2013)
- University of Manitoba in Winnipeg, Manitoba (1986–1995, since 2022)
- University of New Brunswick in Fredericton, New Brunswick (since 1985)
- University of Prince Edward Island in Charlottetown, Prince Edward Island (since 2018)
- University of Waterloo in Waterloo, Ontario (since 1983)
- University of Western Ontario in London, Ontario (since 2016)
- Wilfrid Laurier University in Waterloo (since 2020)
- York University in Toronto (since 2019)
- Queens University in Kingston (since 2020)
- University of Lethbridge in Lethbridge, Alberta (since 2024)
- University of Northern British Columbia in Prince George, British Columbia (since 2026)

=== Former ===
- Acadia University in Wolfville, Nova Scotia (1988–2000)
- Bark Lake/Trent University in South Algonquin, Ontario (1997)
- Queen's University International Study Centre in Herstmonceux, East Sussex, United Kingdom (2001–02)
- St. Andrew's College in Aurora, Ontario (1981–82)
- Trent University in Peterborough, Ontario (2005–08)
- Université de Sherbrooke in Sherbrooke, Quebec (1988–2000)
- University of Strathclyde in Glasgow, Scotland (2000)
- Université Laval in Quebec City, Quebec (2006-2015)

== Shad Alumni ==
Shad has more than 19,000 Shad alumni in 36 countries, 32 of whom are Rhodes Scholars. Among SHAD alumni, there are also Loran Scholars and Schulich Leaders. Additionally, several Canadian post-secondary schools offer scholarships for Shad alumni.

Notable SHAD Fellows include:

- Michele Romanow, Shad 2003, youngest member of CBC's Dragons' Den, co-founder of Buytopia.ca, 100 Most Powerful Women in Canada
- Ted Livingston (Kik), Shad 2004, Founder of Kik Interactive, parent company of the mobile app Kik Messenger
- Darlene Lim, Shad 1989, NASA scientist, renowned researcher currently involved in scientific exploration of the Moon and Mars
- Neil Pasricha, Shad 1998, his "The Book of Awesome" series and "The Happiness Equation" have landed him on New York Times Best Sellers and #1 International Best Sellers lists.
- Parker Mitchell, Shad 1993, co-founder and former CEO of Engineers Without Borders. He also co-founded Significance Labs, a charity that connects the tech world with low-income America.
