= Jean-Christophe Jeauffre =

French film director

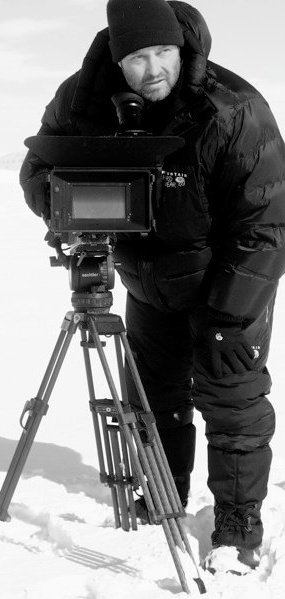
Jeauffre on set in the Arctic in 2010

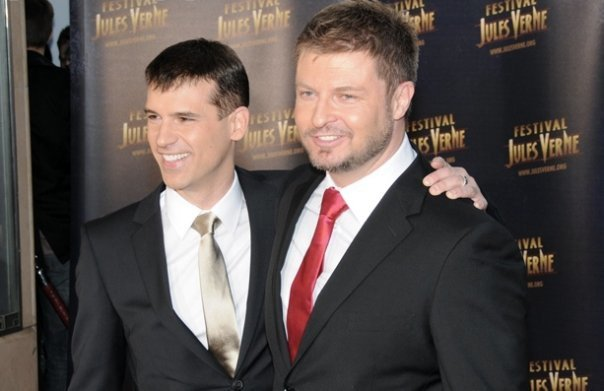
Frédéric Dieudonné and Jean-Christophe Jeauffre in 2009

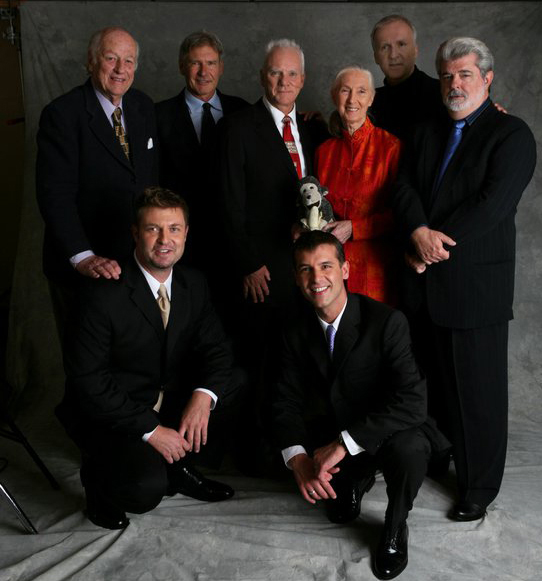
The Jules Verne Festival launch in Los Angeles, October 2006. L-R: Ray Harryhausen, Harrison Ford, Malcolm McDowell, Jane Goodall, James Cameron, George Lucas. Front: Jeauffre and Frédéric Dieudonné

Jean-Christophe Jeauffre is a French filmmaker, screenwriter, and producer, and environmentalist. He is the co-creator, with Frédéric Dieudonné, of the Jules Verne Film Festival in 1992.

== Education and early career ==
After graduating in French literature and Conservatoire of Cinema (Paris), he joined the French Navy in 1990 for two years on Aircraft-carrier Foch during the Lebanon war and was in charge of the ship’s Television production unit where he made his first reportages and documentaries for the Navy. In 1991 in Paris, Jeauffre founded the nonprofit Jules Verne Adventures along with Frédéric Dieudonné.

In 1992, Jeauffre and Dieudonné launched the annual Paris Jules Verne Festival and the Jules Verne JPHs, inaugurated by Jacques-Yves Cousteau. This event, for some years also based in Los Angeles, California, is dedicated to exploration, education and conservation.

Jeauffre developed a film production unit to create new adventure and exploration programs for theatres and television.

== Career ==
=== Filmmaking ===
Jeauffre's passion for exploration and for the sea led him to conceive scientific expeditions and to create a new concept of documentaries he called Action-documentaries, mixing real-life exploration with fictional content. From 1999 to 2016, Jeauffre wrote, directed and produced several films for TV which include Devil's Islands and Red and White.

A five-month expedition on the Atlantic aboard the tall ship Belem led to his production of the highly acclaimed and award-winning documentaries:

- Whales of Atlantis
- Amazon Trek (2008 Best Feature Documentary Award, White Sands International Film Festival, New Mexico)
- 100 Years Under the Sea
- Five Months on the Sea - the Jules Verne Expedition

Two fully illustrated books were also published after the expedition (Jean-Christophe Jeauffre (2003). L'expédition Jules Verne à bord du Trois-Mâts Belem (in French). Equinoxe. ISBN 978-2-84135-352-1. and Jean-Christophe Jeauffre (2002). Esquisses d'un voyage Amazonie-Martinique-Açores. Carnets d'ailleurs (in French). Michel Bez (illus.). Équinoxe. ISBN 978-2-84135-346-0.).

In 2006, he co-wrote and produced the Jules Verne Adventures TV documentary Explorers: From the Titanic to the Moon, starring producer/director James Cameron and veteran Apollo 11 astronaut Buzz Aldrin.

All of the aforementioned films are now being distributed in the US on DVD and Blu-ray with narrations by Christopher Lee and Ernest Borgnine.

Passage to Mars, his latest film, opened in US theatres, September 30, 2016. Narrated by Zachary Quinto, Charlotte Rampling, and Buzz Aldrin, the film was praised by critics (New York Times, The Village Voice, filmdoo, Space.com...) and received Best Picture Awards (REF). It tells the story of a NASA Arctic expedition across the Northwest Passage: the first motorized crossing of the Arctic sea ice aboard prototype humvee Okarian. He co-wrote, produced, directed and edited this feature-length documentary which includes ground-breaking Martian imagery from ESA and NASA.

In 2014, Jeauffre was elected a Fellow of the Explorers Club, based in New York City.

=== The Jules Verne Adventures ===
In 2005 Dieudonné and Jean-Christophe Jeauffre founded the American version of the French nonprofit Jules Verne Adventures. It is based in downtown Los Angeles and maintains an IRS 501(c)3 status. The inaugural American launch of the Los Angeles Jules Verne Festival (October 2006 at the Shrine Auditorium) has celebrated the work of George Lucas, Harrison Ford, Dr. Jane Goodall and James Cameron and attracted 6,300 attendees.
