= Dieter Schütte =

German publisher

Dieter Schütte (4 June 1923 – 8 February 2013) was a German publisher, working for M. DuMont Schauberg.
