= Pascal Lee =

American planetary scientist

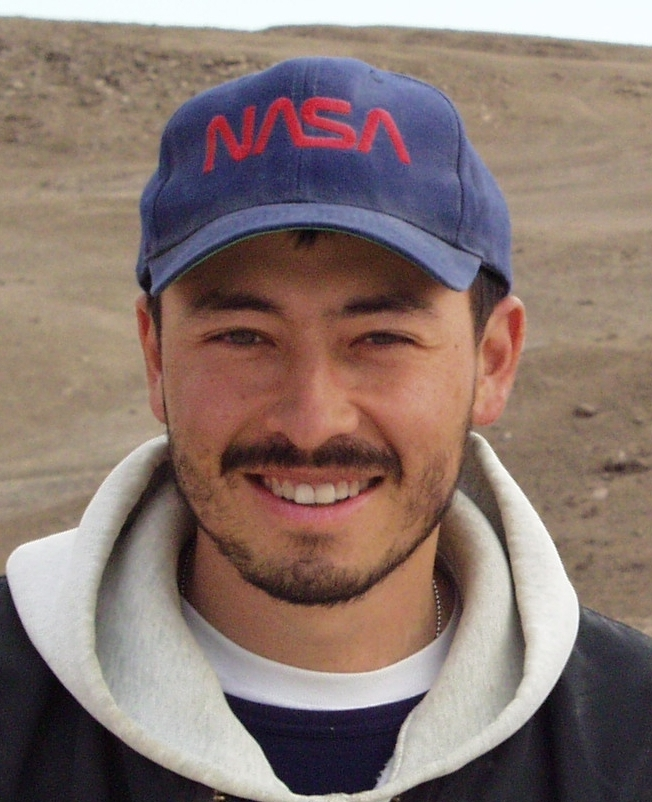
- Born: 1964 (age 61–62)
- Education: M.E. University of Paris (1987); M.S. Cornell University (1993); Ph.D. Cornell University (1997)
- Occupations: Planetary scientist, Explorer; Mars Institute; SETI Institute; NASA Ames Research Center

Pascal Lee (Chinese: 李天龍; born 1964) is a Hong-Kong-born scientist who is the co-founder and chairman of the Mars Institute, a planetary scientist at the SETI Institute, and the Principal Investigator of the Haughton–Mars Project (HMP) at NASA Ames Research Center in Mountain View, California. He holds an ME in geology and geophysics from the University of Paris, and a PhD in astronomy and space sciences from Cornell University.

Lee's research focuses on Mars, asteroids, and impact craters, in particular in connection with the history of water on planets and the possibility of extraterrestrial life. He is known internationally for his work on Moon and Mars analogs in the Arctic, Antarctica, and other extreme environments on Earth. He is the author and co-author of over 100 scientific publications, and first proposed the "Mars Always Cold, Sometimes Wet" model of Mars evolution based on field studies of the geology of Earth's polar regions.

In 1988, Lee wintered over for 402 days at Dumont d'Urville Station, Adélie Land, Antarctica, where he served as the station's chief geophysicist. He also participated in five summer campaigns in Antarctica as a geologist and planetary scientist, in particular as a member of the US Antarctic Search for Meteorites (ANSMET) program.

In 1997, Lee initiated the Haughton–Mars Project (HMP), an international multidisciplinary field research project centered on science and exploration studies at the Haughton impact crater and surrounding terrain on Devon Island, Arctic Canada, viewed as an analog site for the Moon and Mars. Lee has led over 18 HMP field expeditions to date, including the "Northwest Passage Drive Expedition" in April 2009 and May 2010, and continues to serve as the HMP's Director in support of research for NASA and the Canadian Space Agency.

Pascal Lee is widely recognized for his efforts to advance the human exploration of Mars, in particular via its asteroid-like moons Phobos and Deimos.

Lee is a recipient of the United States Antarctic Service Medal and the Space Frontier Foundation's Vision to Reality Award.

Lee is an FAA-certified helicopter flight instructor and lives in Santa Clara, California.

== Early years ==
Pascal Lee was born in 1964 (Hong Kong) and attended St. Joseph's Primary School in Wan Chai. At age 8, he went to boarding school in France where he first attended Le Petit College de la Tournelle in Septeuil, Yvelines, then the Ecole Saint Martin de France in Pontoise, near Paris.

After graduating with a B.S. in physics from the University of Paris, Lee went on to earn an M.E. in geology and geophysics from the University of Paris's Institute of Science and Technology (IST). He began Mars research as a student intern under Audouin Dollfus at the Paris Observatory and Philippe Masson at the University of Paris-Sud.

While in college in Paris, Pascal Lee was an active member of the Cosmos Club de France, a space exploration society founded by space scientist and author Albert Ducrocq. In 1982, Lee was elected the Cosmos Club de France's General Secretary and served in that position until 1987.

From November 1987 to February 1989, Lee spent over a year in Antarctica on national service duty. Upon his return, he moved to the United States to begin graduate studies in astronomy at Cornell University in Ithaca, New York.

== Cornell years ==
Pascal Lee studied astronomy and space sciences at Cornell, and worked as a research and teaching assistant for his thesis adviser Joseph Veverka, and the late Carl Sagan. Pascal Lee's PhD thesis dissertation was titled: "Physical properties and processing of asteroid regoliths and interiors".

As a graduate student, Lee participated in several NASA planetary spacecraft missions, including Voyager 2's flyby of Neptune and its large moon Triton, Galileo's flyby of asteroids 951 Gaspra and 243 Ida, and Mars Observer.

In 1993, Pascal Lee was awarded the Cornell University Department of Astronomy Eleanor Norton York Award.

In 2004, Lee returned to Cornell to teach for a semester as Visiting assistant professor of astronomy.

== Mars missions ==
In 1999, Pascal Lee collaborated as a Participating Scientist on the NASA Mars Polar Lander mission.

In 2001, Lee was Principal Investigator of the "H_{2}O Mars Exploration Rover" (HOMER) mission concept proposed jointly by the SETI Institute and the Boeing Company to NASA's Mars Scout program. HOMER was the first mission to Mars proposed by the Boeing Company.

In 2006, Lee was Principal Investigator of the "Phobos Reconnaissance and International Mars Exploration" (PRIME) Mars mission concept study proposed jointly by the Mars Institute, Optech, and MDA to the Canadian Space Agency.

Lee is currently Principal Investigator of the NASA "Hall" mission concept study, a New Frontiers-class Phobos and Deimos sample return mission concept study.

== Mars Institute ==
In 2002, Pascal Lee and space entrepreneur Marc Boucher co-founded the Mars Institute, an international non-profit public benefit research organization dedicated to advancing the scientific study, exploration, and public understanding of Mars.

Mars Institute-USA is based at the NASA Ames Research Park at Moffett Field, California. Mars Institute-Canada is headquartered in Vancouver, British Columbia.

== Haughton–Mars Project ==
The Haughton–Mars Project is an international multidisciplinary field research project centered on science and exploration studies at the Haughton impact crater and surrounding terrain on Devon Island, Arctic Canada, viewed as an analog site for the Moon and Mars.

The Haughton–Mars Project Research Station or HMPRS, at 75°26′N, 89°52′W, is the world's largest privately operated polar research station. In 2005, the HMPRS was selected to become a node of the Canadian Space Agency's newly formed Canadian Analogue Research Network or CARN program. The HMP RS is managed and operated by the Mars Institute in collaboration with the SETI Institute, and currently supports research from both NASA and the Canadian Space Agency.

Pascal Lee's principal collaborators on the HMP at NASA Ames Research Center are Christopher McKay (HMP Technical Monitor), Terry Fong (Director, Intelligent Robotics Group), and Brian Glass (Director, Autonomous Technologies Group). Lee's key collaborators on the HMP at the Mars Institute include Stephen Braham (HMP Deputy Lead and Chief Field Engineer), John Schutt (HMP Base Manager and Chief Field Guide), and Kira Lorber (HMP Logistics Manager).

== Pressurized rovers ==
In May 2003, Lee led an Arctic winter expedition to drive the Mars Institute's Mars-1 Humvee Rover from Resolute Bay on Cornwallis Island, to Cape McBain on Devon Island across the Wellington Channel's 40 km of sea-ice. The Mars-1, bright red in color, is a modified M997 military ambulance Humvee manufactured by AM General of Mishawaka, IN. Accompanying Lee were American explorer John Schutt and Canadian Inuit field guides Paul Amagoalik and Joe Amarualik of Resolute Bay. The crossing was a success and the Mars-1 has since been serving on the Haughton–Mars Project as a mobile field lab and concept vehicle for future pressurized rovers to be used on the Moon or Mars. NASA's first simulated pressurized rover field traverse was conducted at the Haughton–Mars Project in July 2008 using the Mars-1. Lee commanded the mission while Andrew Abercromby of the NASA Johnson Space Center served as field lead of the rover traverse investigation.

In April 2009, Lee led the Northwest Passage Drive Expedition to ferry a second Humvee, the bright yellow Moon-1 Humvee Rover, from Kugluktuk, Nunavut, to Devon Island, on sea-ice. Accompanying Lee were veterans John Schutt and Joe Amarualik, expedition technician Jesse Weaver, and cameraman Mark Carroll of Jules Verne Adventures. The team succeeded in driving 494 km in 8 days from Kugluktuk to Cambridge Bay, along the fabled Northwest Passage, establishing a record for the longest distance driven on sea-ice in a road vehicle. Plans to drive on from Cambridge Bay to Resolute Bay were abandoned due to extremely rough sea-ice conditions. At one point along the drive from Kugluktuk to Cambridge Bay, the Moon-1 partially fell through a lead (crack in the sea-ice), but was ultimately rescued by the expedition team. The Moon-1 was eventually flown from Cambridge Bay to Resolute Bay where it waited a year before completing its journey to Devon Island.

In May 2010, Lee led the second and final phase of the Northwest Passage Drive Expedition by driving the Moon-1 Humvee Rover from Resolute Bay, Cornwallis Island, to Domville Point, Devon Island. Accompanying Lee were veterans John Schutt, Joe Amarualik, Jesse Weaver, and Mark Carroll, and documentary director Jean-Christophe Jeauffre of Jules Verne Adventures. The 150 km journey, of which 60 km were on sea-ice, took 12 days. The Moon-1's arrival on Devon Island was hailed as in important success for the Haughton–Mars Project, as it opened the way for dual pressurized rover simulations using the two Humvee rovers working in tandem.

Lee also participated in field tests of NASA's Surface Exploration Vehicle (SEV), formerly known as the Lunar Exploration Rover (LER) or Small Pressurized Rover (SPR). In August 2008, Lee was pilot scientist of the first field test of the SEV, which was conducted under the auspices of the NASA Desert RATS project at the Black Point Lava Flow site in Northern Arizona. NASA Astronaut Rex Walheim was pilot commander of the 1-day mission. The SEV was developed at the NASA Johnson Space Center principally under the leadership of astronaut Michael Gernhardt and robotics engineer Robert Ambrose.

== Mars habitats ==
In 1998, Pascal Lee proposed the creation of a Mars Lander-like habitat at Haughton Crater on Devon Island to support field studies of requirements for future human Mars exploration. After co-founding the Mars Society, Lee led the development, establishment, and early operation of the "Flashline Mars Arctic Research Station" or FMARS, the world's first simulated Mars habitat. The FMARS was conceived by Lee to serve as a new research element of the Haughton–Mars Project. The Mars Society collaborated on the HMP through the 2001 field season, but since 2002, the society is no longer a partner of the HMP.

== Drake equation ==
Based on probable values for the Drake equation, Pascal Lee proposed that the number of intelligent civilizations in the Milky Way is 1 or very close to 1, implying that we are alone. The main contributor to such a low number is the fraction developing intelligent life, which is based on how much time it took for intelligent life (Homo erectus) to develop compared to the overall age of Earth (4.6 billion years).
