= John Schutt =

John Schutt (born 1948) is an American mountaineer, geologist, and explorer. He serves as lead field guide for the Antarctic Search for Meteorites (ANSMET) program, and as chief field guide and base manager for the Haughton-Mars Project (HMP). He was a member of the HMP's Northwest Passage Drive Expedition. He has summited Denali fifty times.

== ANSMET ==
Schutt has served as lead field guide for the annual ANSMET program since 1978, and has participated in over 35 summer field campaigns collecting meteorites in Antarctica. Schutt is believed to have recovered more meteorites than any single person in history, and in particular, more meteorites from the Moon and Mars.

== Haughton-Mars Project ==
Schutt has served as chief field guide for the Haughton-Mars Project (HMP) and as base manager at the HMP Research Station on Devon Island in the Arctic since the beginning of the project in 1997. He was also expedition field guide and navigator during the NWPDX-2009 and NWPDX-2010 campaigns of the Northwest Passage Drive Expedition.

== Honors ==
John Schutt won the Meteoritical Society's Service Award in 2007. Asteroid 61190 Johnschutt is named in his honor. The Schutt Glacier in Antarctica is named after him.
