= Schutt Glacier =

Glacier in Antarctica

Schutt Glacier (78°16′S 161°31′E) is a glacier in the Hillary Coast region of the Ross Dependency. It flows south to join the Upper Staircase of the Skelton Glacier close to Stepaside Spur. It is named after John Schutt, Dept. of Geology and Planetary Sciences, University of Pittsburgh; member of United States Antarctic Program (USAP) meteorite search teams in Victoria Land in seven field seasons, 1981–92.
