= Haughton–Mars Project =

Mars research project

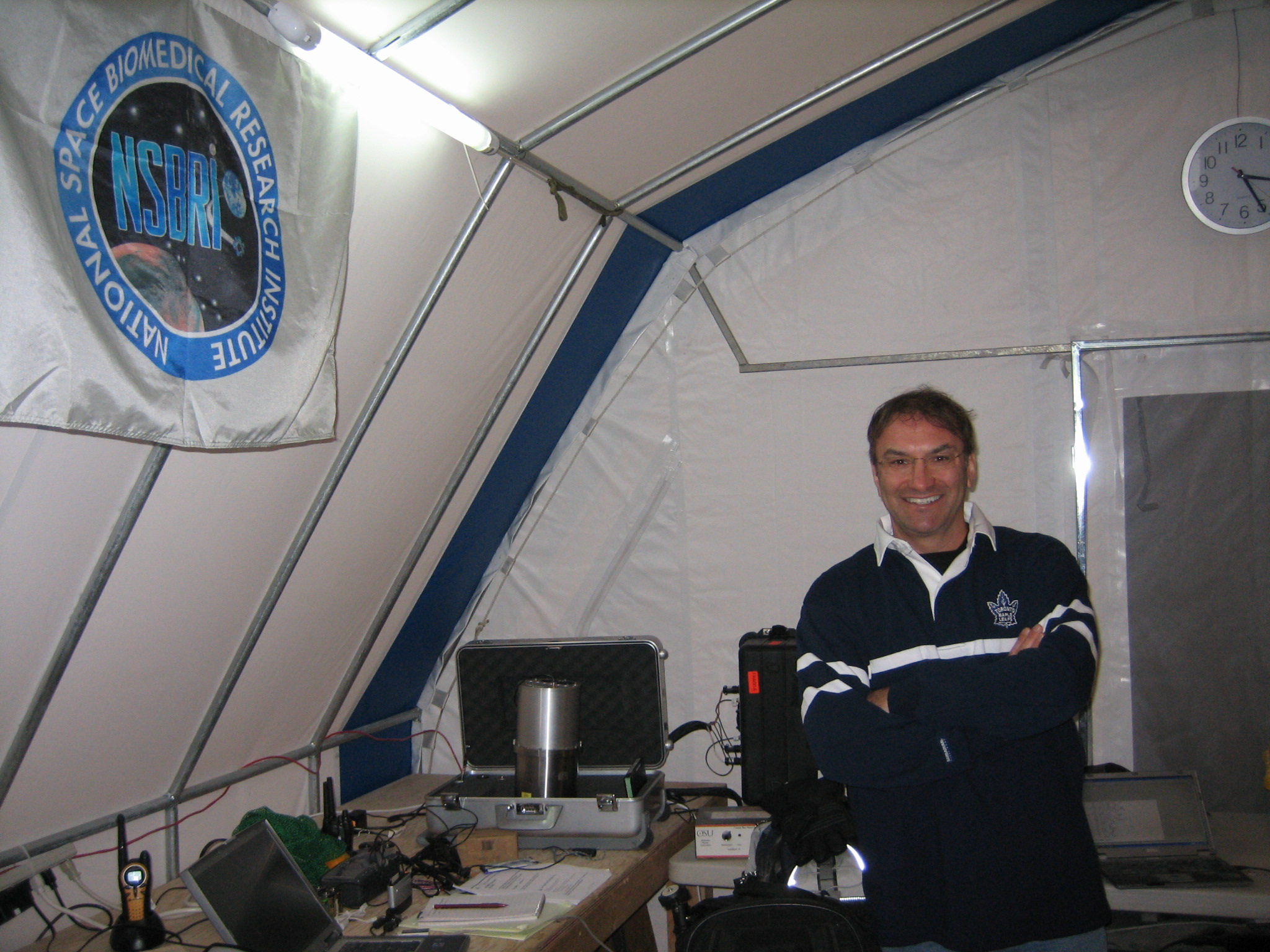
Jeffrey P. Sutton at the Haughton–Mars project

The Haughton–Mars Project (HMP) is an international interdisciplinary field research project being carried out near the Haughton impact crater on Devon Island. Human-centered computing (HCC) studies are aimed at determining how human explorers might live and work on other planetary objects, in particular on Mars. Conducted jointly by SETI and the Mars Institute, the project's goal is to utilize the Mars-like features of Devon Island and the impact crater to develop and test new technologies and field operating procedures, and to study the human dynamics which result from extended contact in close quarters. This knowledge will be used in planning missions by both humans and robots to other terrestrial bodies.

== History ==
The HMP came about as a postdoctoral research proposal by Pascal Lee, then a Cornell University graduate student. The proposal was approved by the National Research Council and NASA Ames Research Center in 1996. By 2000, the science and exploration research goals had been set, and a number of features which could serve as Mars analogs had been found. The core module of the NASA HMP Base Camp, the HMP X-1 Station, had been built. It serves as a hub, connecting a number of tents in a star-like configuration.

The project is funded primarily by NASA, but draws nearly half of its support from other sources. A large number of governmental and non-governmental organizations and agencies worldwide contribute annually to the project's activities. As well as financial contributions, the project has also been the recipient of gifts such as the Arthur Clarke Mars Greenhouse, donated by SpaceRef Interactive, and a specially-equipped Humvee, donated by AM General.

The active period of the project is in the summer, when tens of researchers, students, support staff, and media arrive on site. A core group of about ten stays the summer, while other individuals stay for shorter periods. Local high school students are hired to assist with field activities.

Ten participants in the project voluntarily underwent comprehensive field immunology assessments. The purpose of the study was to evaluate mission-associated effects on the human immune system, as well as to evaluate techniques developed for processing immune samples in remote field locations.

== See also ==
- Flashline Mars Arctic Research Station
