= Mars Institute =

Non-profit space exploration advocacy group

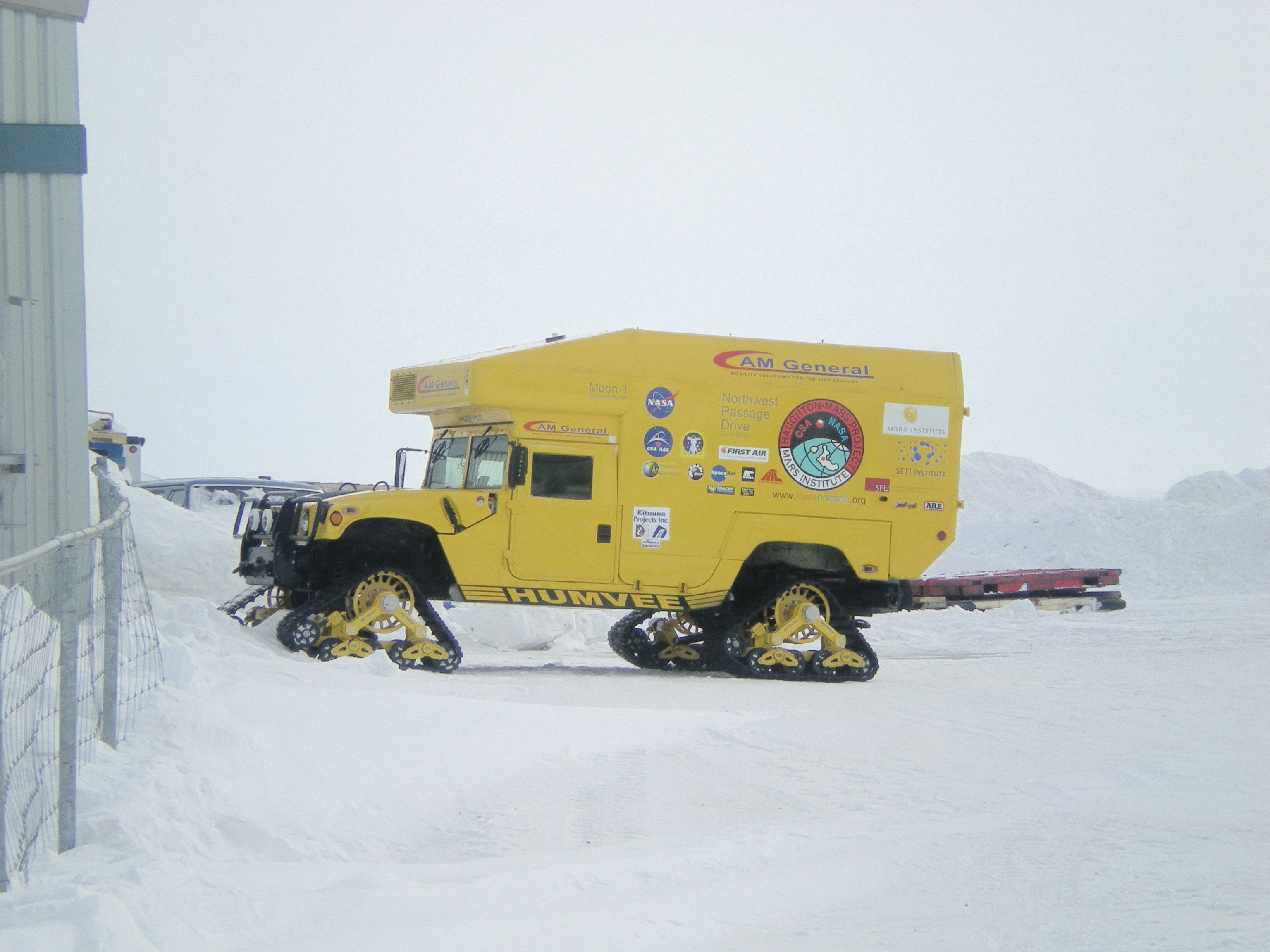
The Mars Institute Moon-1 Humvee Rover in Cambridge Bay waiting for the 109th Airlift Squadron's C-130 to airlift it to Resolute Bay Airport

The Mars Institute is an international non-governmental organization created with the goals of advancing the scientific study and exploration of Mars, conducting peer-reviewed research, and educating the public about Mars exploration. It was incorporated as a non-profit corporation in both United States and Canada in 2002.

The Haughton-Mars Project is an interdisciplinary research project being carried out by the Mars Institute and SETI. The Haughton-Mars Project is dedicated to advancing planetary science and exploration. The Haughton-Mars Project is centered on the scientific study of the Haughton meteorite impact crater and surrounding terrain on Devon Island. The institute also supports two other projects: the Mars Institute Mars-1 Humvee Rover and the Romance to Reality project. Donated by AM General, the Mars-1 Humvee is designed to accommodate crews of up to four researchers on Devon Island and to act as a test bed for future crewed rovers on the Moon and Mars. The Romance to Reality: Moon & Mars mission plans project was first launched on August 28, 1996 by David S. F. Portree. This project is a project that documents and teaches about the many plans for space missions and programs that either never happened or took a long time to actually complete. The Romance to Reality project was written by David S. F. Portree until 2006. In 2001, he wrote a spin off to Romance to Reality that was called Humans to Mars. After both of these websites, David S. F. Portree created a blog titled Beyond Apollo that moved to WIRED in 2012. In 2015, David S. F. Portree then moved to another blog which is called DSFP's Spaceflight History Blog which is still currently running.

Mars Institute-USA is based in the NASA Ames Research Park at Moffett Field, California. Mars Institute-Canada is headquartered in Vancouver, British Columbia.
