= Arctic Cordillera =

Terrestrial ecozone in northern Canada

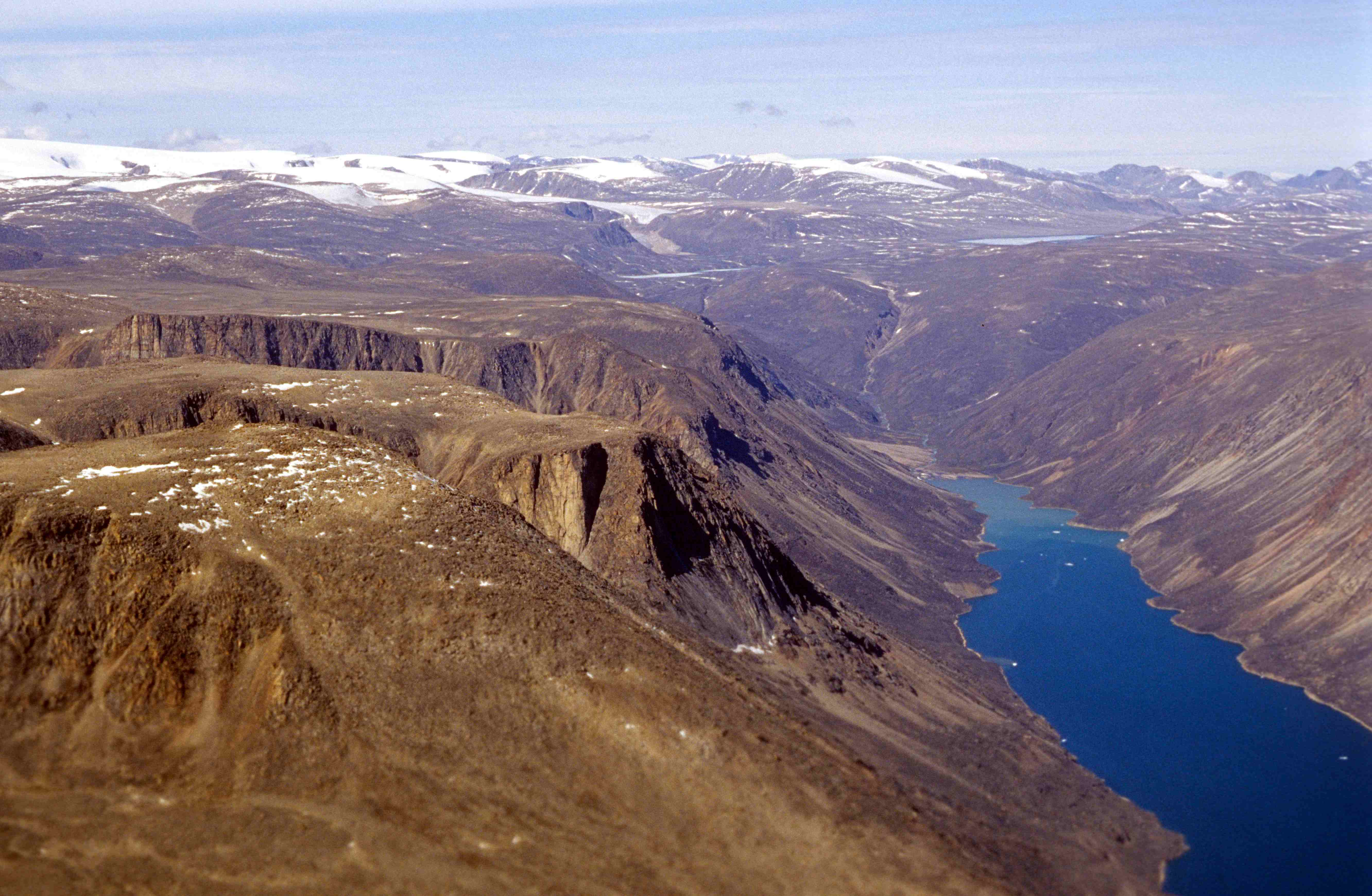
- Baffin Mountains ecoregion of the Arctic Cordillera

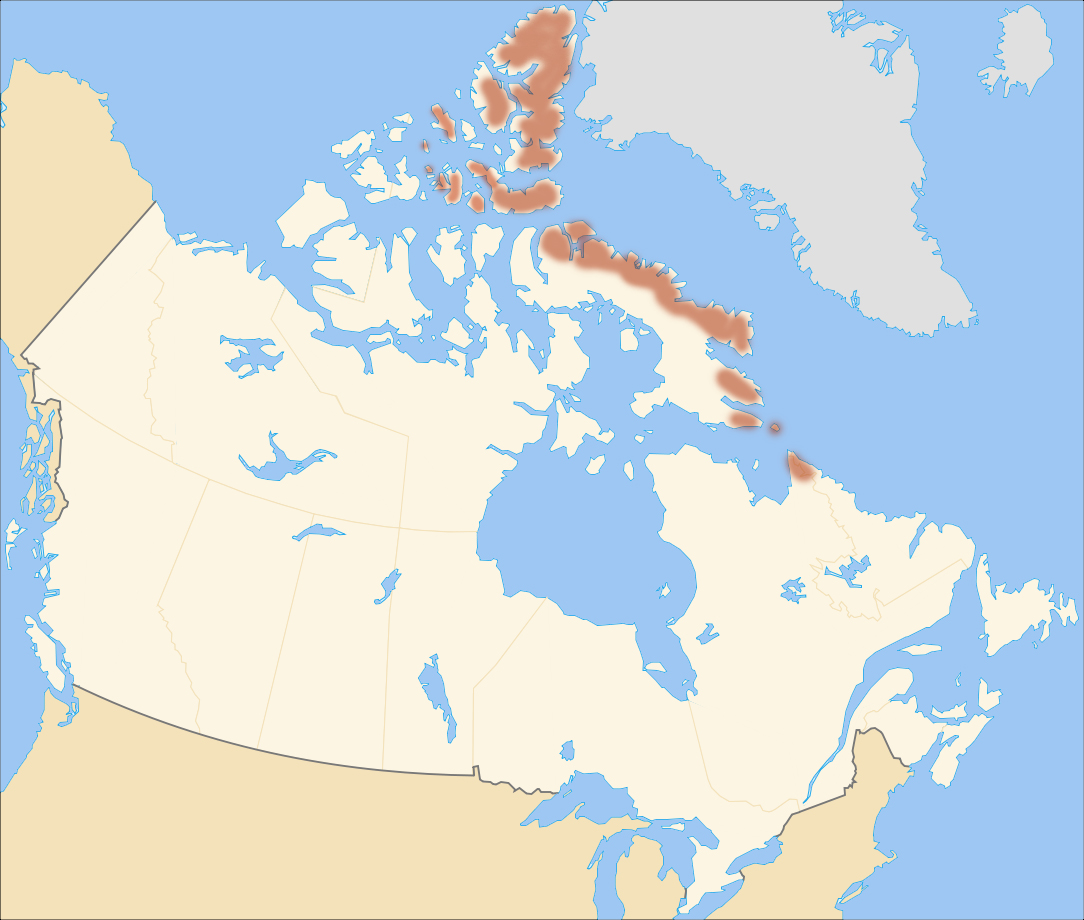

Ecology
- Borders: Northern Arctic; Taiga Shield

Geography
- Area: 242,190 km^{2} (93,510 mi^{2})
- Country: Canada
- Provinces: Newfoundland and Labrador; Nunavut; Quebec
- Coordinates: 81.93°N 74.90°W
- Climate type: Polar and Ice cap

The Arctic Cordillera is a Level I terrestrial ecoregion of North America designated by the Commission for Environmental Cooperation (CEC) in its North American Environmental Atlas. Located in northern Canada, it is characterized by a vast, deeply dissected chain of mountain ranges extending along the northeastern flank of the Canadian Arctic Archipelago from Ellesmere Island to the northeasternmost part of the Labrador Peninsula in northern Labrador and northern Quebec, Canada. It spans most of the eastern coast of Nunavut with high glaciated peaks rising through ice fields and some of Canada's largest ice caps, including the Penny Ice Cap on Baffin Island. It is bounded to the east by Baffin Bay, Davis Strait and the Labrador Sea while its northern portion is bounded by the Arctic Ocean.

The geographic range is composed along the provinces of Labrador: including Eastern Baffin, Devon Island, Ellesmere, Bylot Island, the Torngat Mountains, and some parts of the Northeastern fringe. The landscape is dominated by massive polar icefields, alpine glaciers, inland fjords, and large bordering bodies of water, distinctive of many similar arctic regions in the world. Although the terrain is infamous for its unforgiving conditions, humans maintained an established population of 1000 people – 80% of which were Inuit. In addition, the landscape is 75% covered by ice or exposed bedrock, with a continuous permafrost that persists throughout the year, making plant and animal life somewhat scarce. The temperature of the Arctic Cordillera ranges from 6 °C in summer, down to −16 °C in winter. Vegetation is largely absent in this area due to permanent ice and snow.

== Overview ==
The range is mostly located in Nunavut but extends southeast into the northernmost tip of Labrador and northeastern Quebec. The system is divided into a series of ranges, with mountains reaching heights of more than 2,000 m (6,562 ft). The highest is Barbeau Peak on Ellesmere Island at 2,616 m (8,583 ft), which is the highest point in eastern North America. The system is also one of Canada's three mountain systems, the others being the Western Cordillera of Western Canada and the Canadian extension of the Appalachian Mountains into the Gaspé Peninsula and Atlantic Provinces.

The Arctic Cordillera is a narrow ecozone compared to other Canadian ecozones. The majority of this ecozone borders the Northern Arctic, while the small segment within Labrador borders the Taiga Shield. While the Arctic Cordillera mountain system includes most of the Arctic islands and regions such as Bathurst Island, Cornwall Island, Amund Ringnes Island, Ellef Ringnes Island, Ellesmere Island, Baffin Island, Bylot Island and Labrador, the Arctic Cordillera Ecozone only covers Ellesmere Island, Baffin Island, Axel Heiberg Island, Bylot Island and Labrador.

== Geography ==
=== Regions ===
The Arctic Cordillera is geographically diverse. Much of Ellesmere Island is covered by the Arctic Cordillera, making it the most mountainous in the Canadian Arctic Archipelago. It is considered part of the Queen Elizabeth Islands, with Cape Columbia being the most northerly point of land in Canada. It encompasses an area of 196,235 km^{2} (75,767 sq mi), making it the world's tenth largest island and Canada's third largest island. The first inhabitants of Ellesmere Island were small bands of Inuit drawn to the area for Peary caribou, muskox, and marine mammal hunting about 1000–2000 BC.

Axel Heiberg Island is one of the several members of the Canadian Arctic Archipelago and the largest of the Sverdrup Islands, having an area of 43,178 km^{2} (16,671 sq mi). It has been inhabited in the past by Inuit, but was uninhabited by the time it was named by Otto Sverdrup, who explored it around 1900. In 1959, scientists from McGill University explored Expedition Fiord in central Axel Heiberg Island. This resulted in the establishment of the McGill Arctic Research Station, constructed 8 km (5 mi) inland from Expedition Fjord in 1960.

Baffin Island is the largest island in Canada and the fifth largest in the world, with an area of 507,451 km^{2} (195,928 sq mi).

Devon Island is the largest uninhabited island on Earth. With an area of 55,247 km^{2} (21,331 sq mi), it is the second-largest of the Queen Elizabeth Islands, the 27th largest in the world and Canada's 6th largest. An outpost was established at Dundas Harbour in August 1924 as part of a government presence intended to curb foreign whaling and other activity.

Much of Bylot Island is covered by the Arctic Cordillera. At 11,067 km^{2} (4,273 sq mi) it is ranked 71st largest island in the world and Canada's 17th largest. While there are no permanent settlements on Bylot, Inuit from Pond Inlet regularly travel to it.

=== Protected areas ===
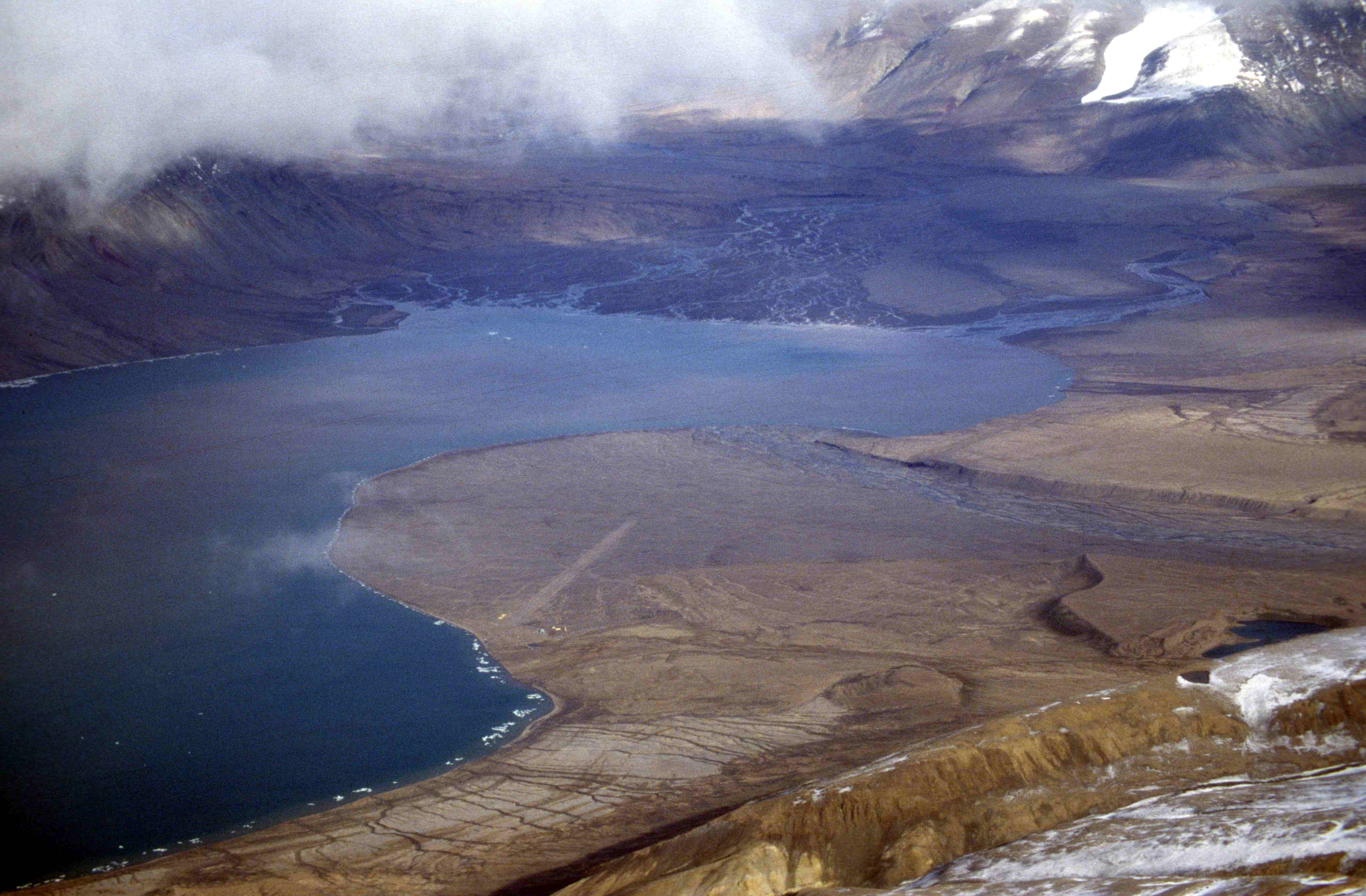
Tanquary Fiord, showing confluence of Air Force River, Rollrock River and Macdonald River

More than one-fifth of Ellesmere Island is protected as Quttinirpaaq National Park (formerly Ellesmere Island National Park), which includes seven fjords and a variety of glaciers, as well as Lake Hazen, the world's largest lake north of the Arctic Circle. Barbeau Peak, the highest mountain in Nunavut at 2616 m (8583 ft), is located in the British Empire Range on Ellesmere Island. The most northern mountain range in the world, the Challenger Mountains, is located in the northwest region of the island. The northern lobe of the island is called Grant Land.

In July 2007, a study noted the disappearance of habitat for waterfowl, invertebrates, and algae on Ellesmere Island. According to John P. Smol of Queen's University in Kingston, Ontario, and Marianne S. V. Douglas of the University of Alberta in Edmonton, warming conditions and evaporation have caused low-water-level changes in the chemistry of ponds and wetlands in the area. The researchers noted, "In the 1980s they often needed to wear hip waders to make their way to the ponds, while by 2006 the same areas were dry enough to burn."

Sirmilik National Park in northern Baffin Island harbours large populations of thick-billed murres, black-legged kittiwakes and greater snow geese. The park comprises three areas: Bylot Island, Oliver Sound and the Borden Peninsula.

Auyuittuq National Park, located on Baffin Island's Cumberland Peninsula, features the many terrains of Arctic wilderness such as fjords, glaciers, and ice fields. In Inuktitut—the language of Nunavut's Aboriginal people, Inuit—Auyuittuq means "the land that never melts." Although Auyuittuq was established in 1976 as a national park reserve, it was upgraded to a full national park in 2000. Well-known peaks in the park include Mount Asgard and Mount Thor, with a 1250 m (4101 ft), 105° cliff face.

The Torngat Mountains National Park Reserve, located on the Labrador Peninsula, covers much of the southern end of the Arctic Cordillera. It protects many species of Arctic wildlife, such as caribou, polar bears, peregrine falcons and golden eagles. The park was established on January 22, 2005, making it the first national park to be created in Labrador.

=== Glaciers and ice caps ===
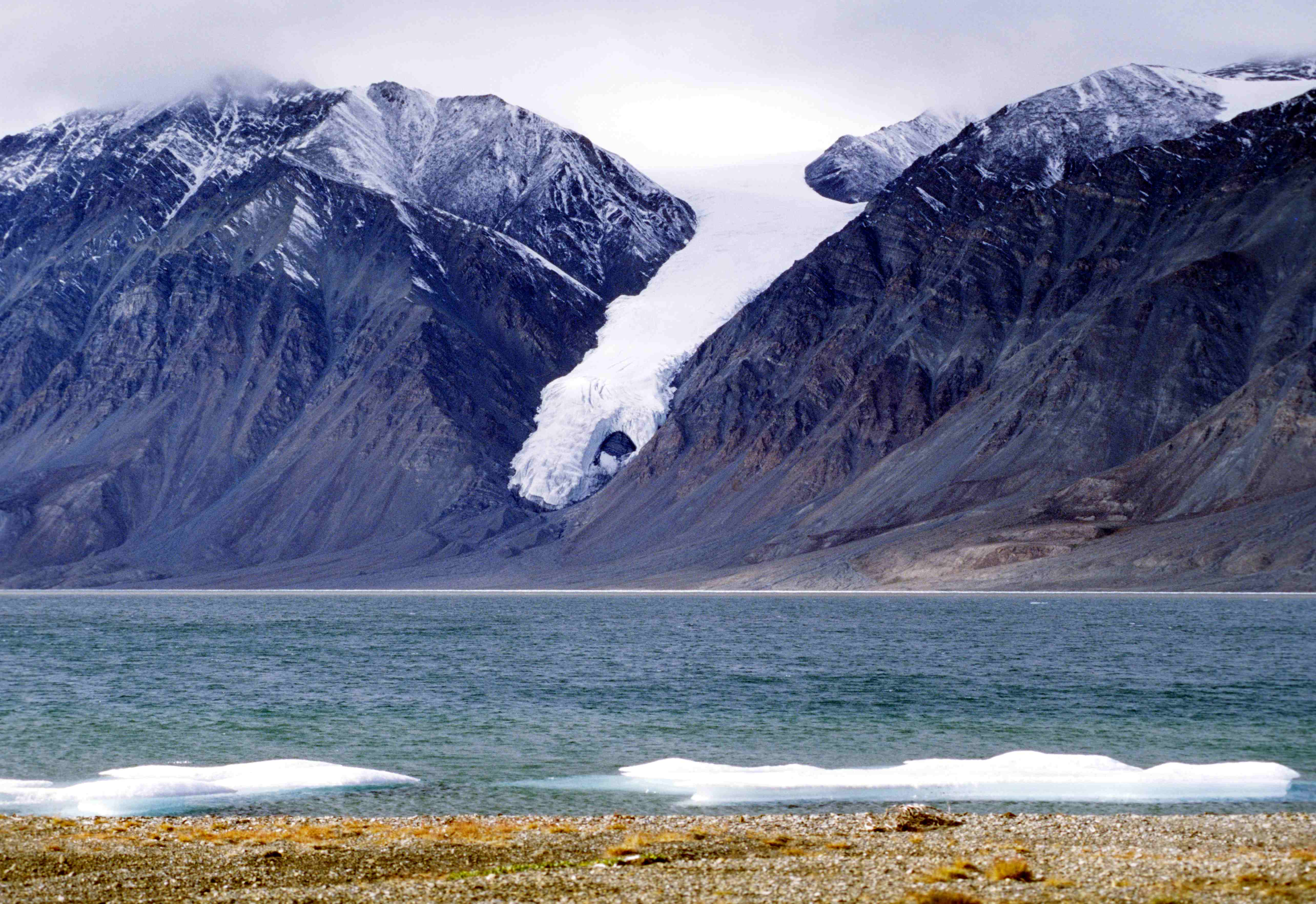
Gull Glacier in Tanquary Fjord

The drier northern section of the Arctic Cordillera is largely covered with ice caps while glaciers are more common at the more humid southern end. Large portions of Ellesmere Island are covered with glaciers and ice, with Manson Icefield and Sydkap in the south; Prince of Wales Icefield and Agassiz Ice Cap along the central-east side of the island; and substantial ice cover in Northern Ellesmere Island. The northwest coast of Ellesmere Island was covered by a massive, 500 km (310 mi) long ice shelf until the 20th century. The Ellesmere ice shelf reduced by 90 percent in the twentieth century due to global warming, leaving the separate Alfred Ernest, Ayles, Milne, Ward Hunt, and Markham Ice Shelves. A 1986 survey of Canadian ice shelves found that 48 km^{2} (19 sq mi), involving 3.3 km^{3} (0.79 cu mi) of ice, calved from the Milne and Ayles ice shelves between 1959 and 1974. The Ward Hunt Ice Shelf, the largest remaining section of thick (greater than 10 m [33 ft]) landfast sea ice along the northern coastline of Ellesmere Island, lost 600 km (370 mi) of ice in a massive calving in 1961–1962. It further decreased by 27% in thickness (13 m, 43 ft) between 1967 and 1999. The breakup of the Ellesmere ice shelves has continued in the 21st century: the Ward Ice Shelf experienced a major breakup during summer 2002; the Ayles Ice Shelf calved entirely on August 13, 2005—the largest break-off of the ice shelf in 25 years, it may pose a threat to the oil industry in the Beaufort Sea (the piece is 66 km^{2} [25 sq mi]).

The Barnes icecap is found in the central part of the Baffin Island and has been in retreat since at least the early 1960s when the Geographical Branch of the then Department of Mines & Technical Surveys sent a three-man survey team to the area to measure isostatic rebound and cross-valley features of the Isortoq River.

== Hydrology ==
Nearly 75% of the land within this ecoregion is exposed bedrock or ice. The majority of the water is locked up in frozen ice and snow, therefore there are very few named rivers or other bodies of water within this region. The annual amount precipitation is about 200 mm, which usually falls down as snow or ice. Huge ice caps dominate the landscape, and they spawn large glaciers that are pushed down steep fjords and into the sea. When the temperature gets above freezing for an extended period time a little amount of runoff is created, which is generally under 200 mm annually.

== Geology ==
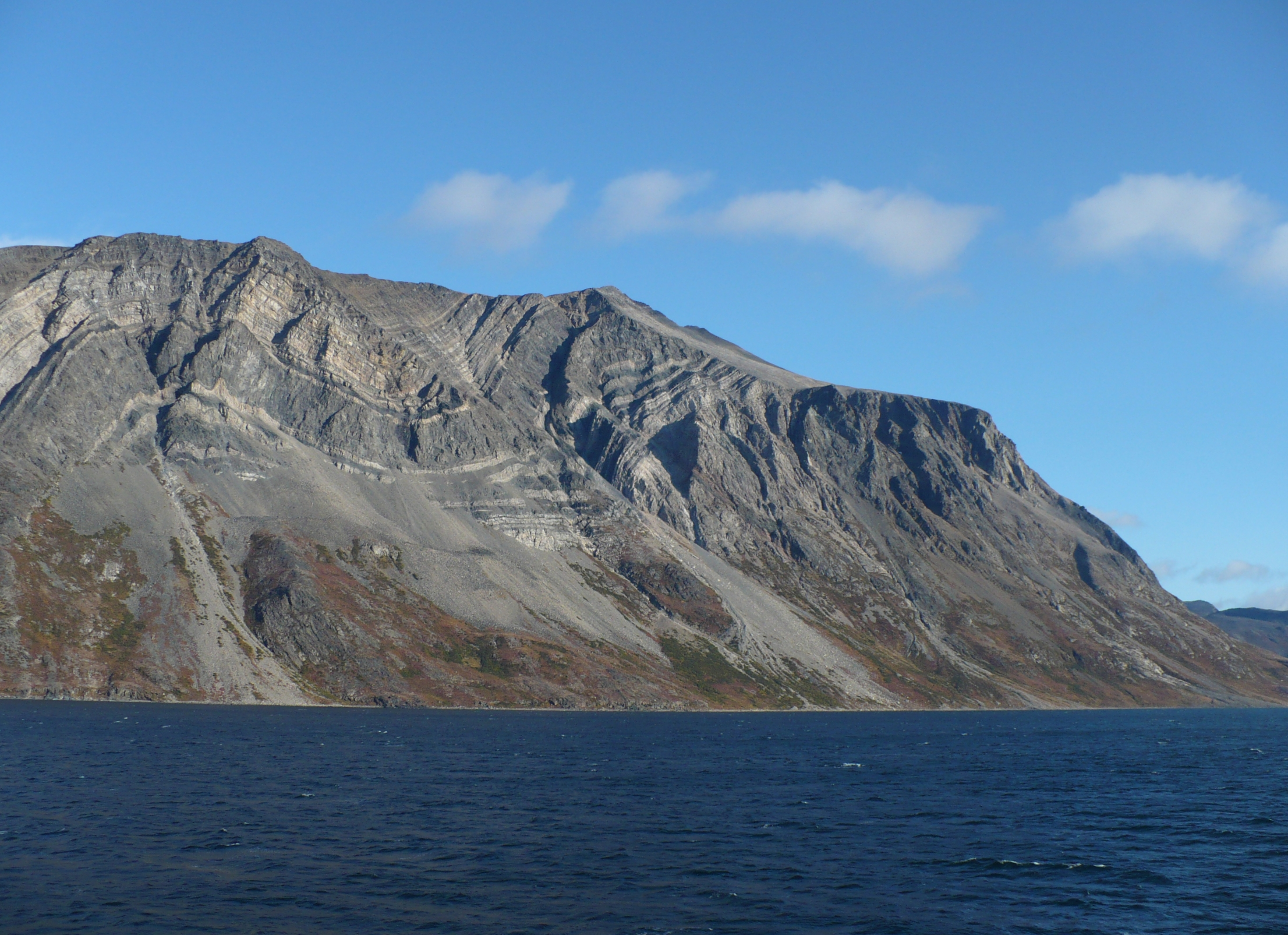
Folded rock in the Torngat Mountains

The northern portion of the Arctic Cordillera was uplifted during the Innuitian orogeny when the North American Plate moved northward during the mid-Mesozoic. It contains igneous and metamorphic rocks, but for the most part is composed of sedimentary rocks. Mountains on Axel Heiberg Island consist mainly of long ridges of folded mid-Mesozoic and Palaeozoic strata with minor igneous intrusions.

The Arctic Cordillera is younger than the Appalachians, and so erosion has not had time to reduce it to rounded hills. The mountains are also barren because trees can neither survive the extremely cold winter temperatures, nor grow during the short summers. Vast areas are covered by permanent ice and snow. The Arctic Cordillera resembles the Appalachians in composition and contain similar types of minerals. The mineral resources have not been greatly exploited, however, because the region's remote location makes development too costly when cheaper alternatives exist further south.

Mountains on southeastern Ellesmere Island are principally made of granitic gneiss, magmatic, undifferentiated intrusive and volcanic rocks. They are typified by being highly eroded, with conspicuous deep vertical fissures and narrow ledges.

The Arctic Cordillera form the eastern edge of the Canadian Shield, which covers much of Canada's landscape. Precambrian rock is the major component of the bedrock.

The Arctic Cordillera is dominated by vast mountain ranges stretching for thousands of miles, virtually untouched by man. These mountains were formed millions of years ago during the mid-Mesozoic when the North American Plate moved northward, pushing earth and rock upwards. The mountains of the north contain metamorphic and igneous rock, and are predominantly sedimentary rock. On the other hand, the southern mountains are greater, composed of granite gneiss and magmatic volcanic rock. These mountains are characterized as being highly erodible with very steep and jagged cliffs with narrow ledges. The highest peak in the Arctic Cordillera mountain range is Barbeau Peak – standing almost nine thousand feet tall. In general, the Arctic Cordillera Mountain Range is most similar (in composition and age) to the Appalachian Mountain Range of the United States. However, as the Appalachian Mountains are slightly older, their cliffs have been eroded, and are less jagged than those of the Arctic Cordillera.This ecoregion is also home to very limited amounts of exposed soil. Only in extremely sheltered places – such as that of caves – is surface soil present. The remaining soil is hidden beneath deep snow and ice, and is kept in a constant state of permafrost.

=== Volcanism ===
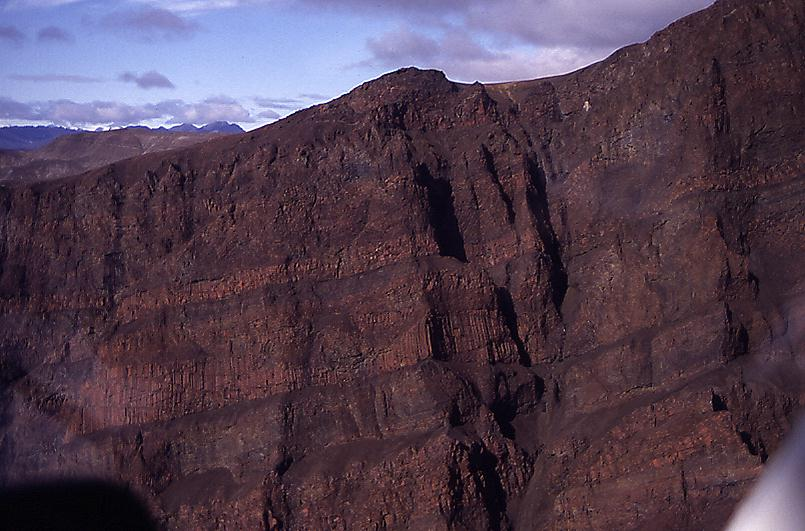
Dragon Cliff, including the flood basalt lava layers

Mountains of volcanic rock range in age from 1.2 billion to 65 million years old. The Late Cretaceous Ellesmere Island Volcanics has been uncertainly associated to both the early volcanic activity of the Iceland hotspot and the Alpha Ridge. Even though these volcanics are about 90 million years old, the volcanoes and cinder can still be seen.

The Late Cretaceous Strand Fiord Formation is interpreted to represent the craton-ward extension of the Alpha Ridge, a volcanic ridge that was active during the formation of the Amerasian Basin. The formation is part of the thick Sverdrup Basin succession and immediately precedes the final basin foundering event. The Strand Fiord volcanics are encased in marine strata and thin southward from a maximum thickness of more than 789 m (2,589 ft) on northwestern Axel Heiberg to a zero edge near the southern shore of the island. Tholeiitic icelandite basalt flows are the main constituent of the formation with pyroclastic conglomerates, sandstones, mudrocks and rare coal seams also present. The lava flows range in thickness from 6 to 60 m (20 to 197 ft) and subaerial flows predominate. Both pahoehoe and aa lava types are common and the volcanic pile accumulated mostly by the quiet effusion of lavas. The pyroclastic lithologies become more common near the southern and eastern edges of the formation and represent lahars and beach to shallow marine reworked deposits. The formation contains flood basalts, which are found on western Axel Heiberg Island at Dragon Cliff, 300 m (980 ft) tall. It contains columnar jointing units that are usually 1 to 3 m (3 ft 3 in to 9 ft 10 in) in diameter.

The Bravo Lake Formation in central Baffin Island is a rare alkaline suite that formed as a result of submarine rifting during the Paleoproterozoic period. The lavas of the volcanic belt display geochemical characteristics similar to modern ocean-island-basalt groups. The range from moderately to intensely fractionated. Rare-earth-element profiles are similar to those from tholeiitic basalts and extremely alkaline lavas in Hawaii.

== Highest peaks ==
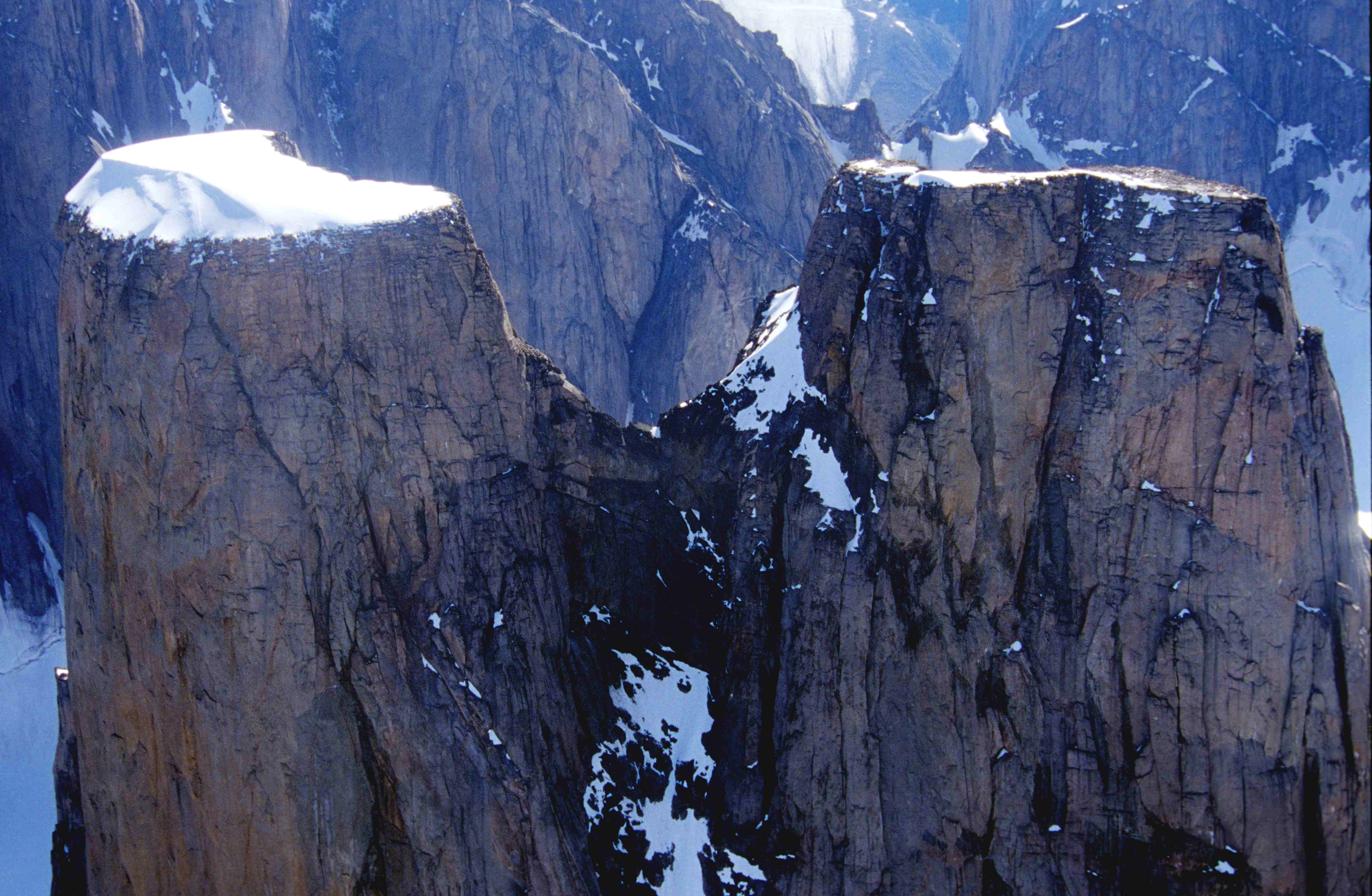
Mount Asgard in July 2001

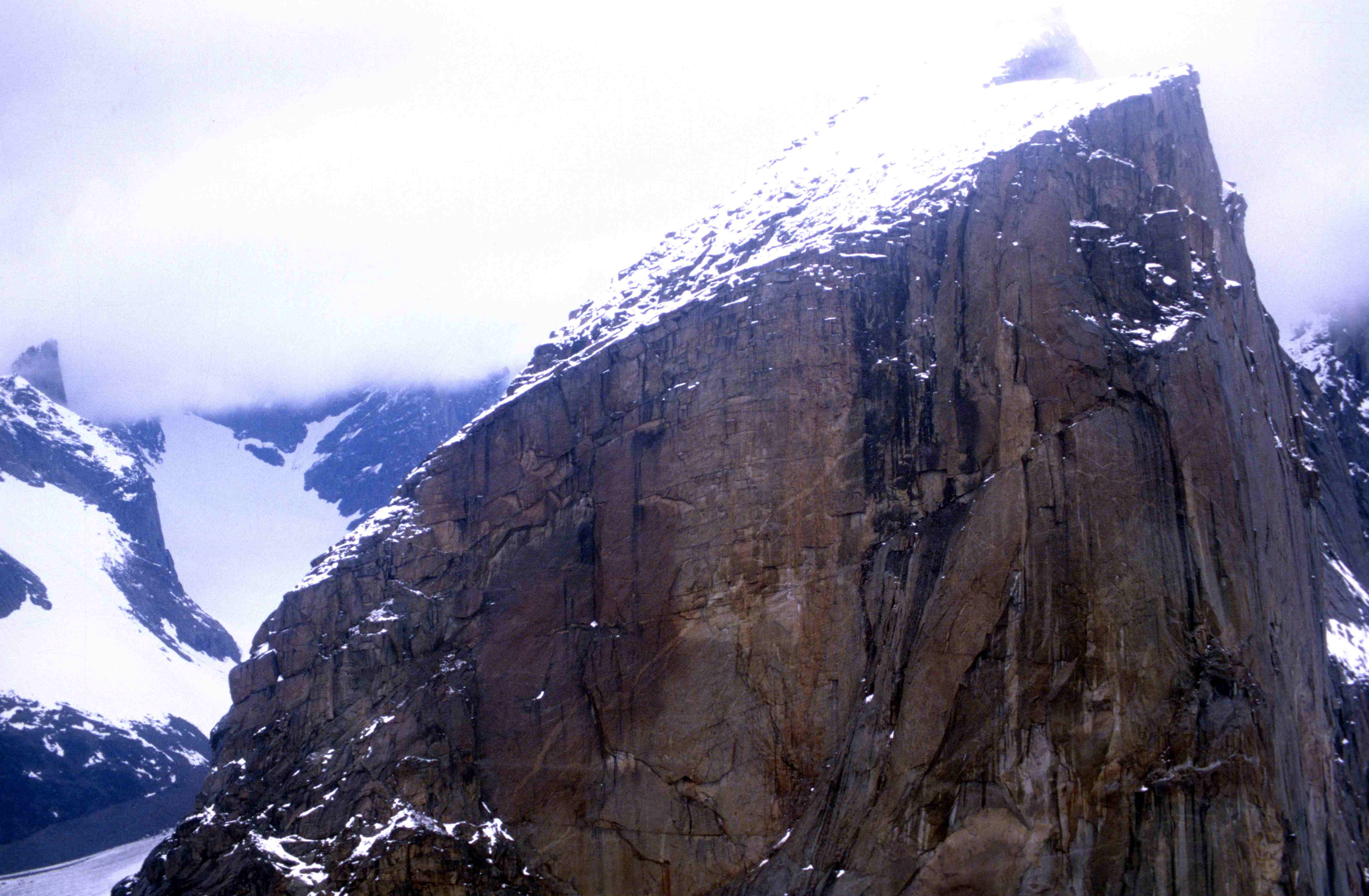
Mount Thor in 1997

Mountain/peak	metres	feet	Notes
Barbeau Peak	2,616	8,583	Highest point on Ellesmere Island
Mount Whisler	2,500	8,202	Second highest point on Ellesmere Island
Commonwealth Mountain	2,225	7,300	
Mount Oxford	2,210	7,251	
Outlook Peak	2,210	7,251	Highest point on Axel Heiberg Island
Mount Odin	2,147	7,044	Highest point on Baffin Island
Mount Asgard	2,015	6,611	
Qiajivik Mountain	1,963	6,440	Highest point in northern Baffin Island
Angilaaq Mountain	1,951	6,401	Highest point on Bylot Island
Kisimngiuqtuq Peak	1,905	6,250	
Arrowhead Mountain	1,860	6,102	
Mount Eugene	1,850	6,070	
Ukpik Peak	1,809	5,935	
Mount Nukap	1,780	5,840	
Bastille Peak	1,733	5,656	
Mount Thule	1,711	5,614	
Angna Mountain	1,710	5,610	
Mount Thor	1,675	5,500	Features the Earth's greatest purely vertical drop
Mount Caubvick	1,642	5,387	Highest point in mainland Canada east of Alberta

== Mountain ranges ==
Several ranges of the Arctic Cordillera have official names:

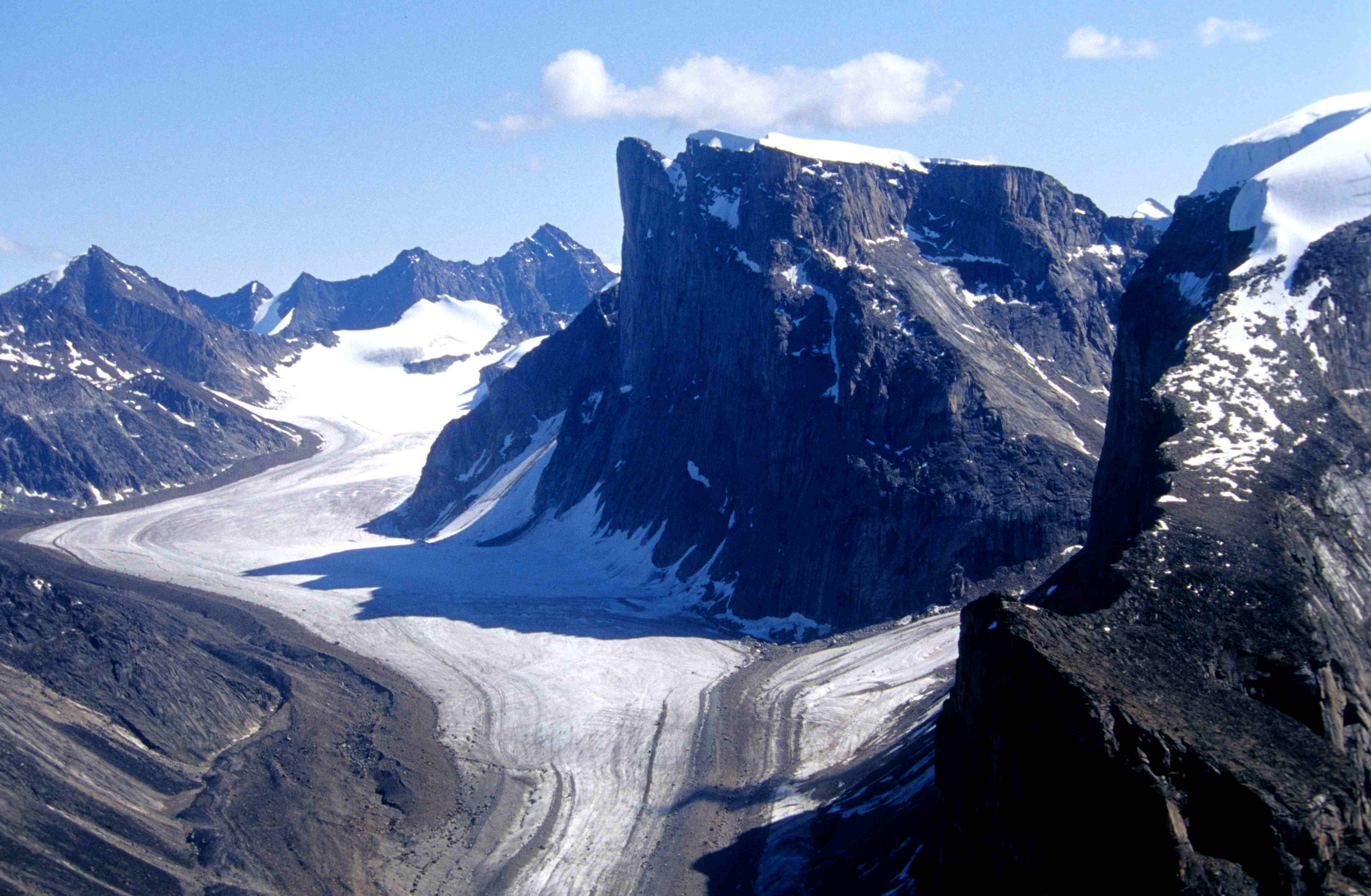
Characteristic rock formations and glaciers. Turnweather Peak in the middle.

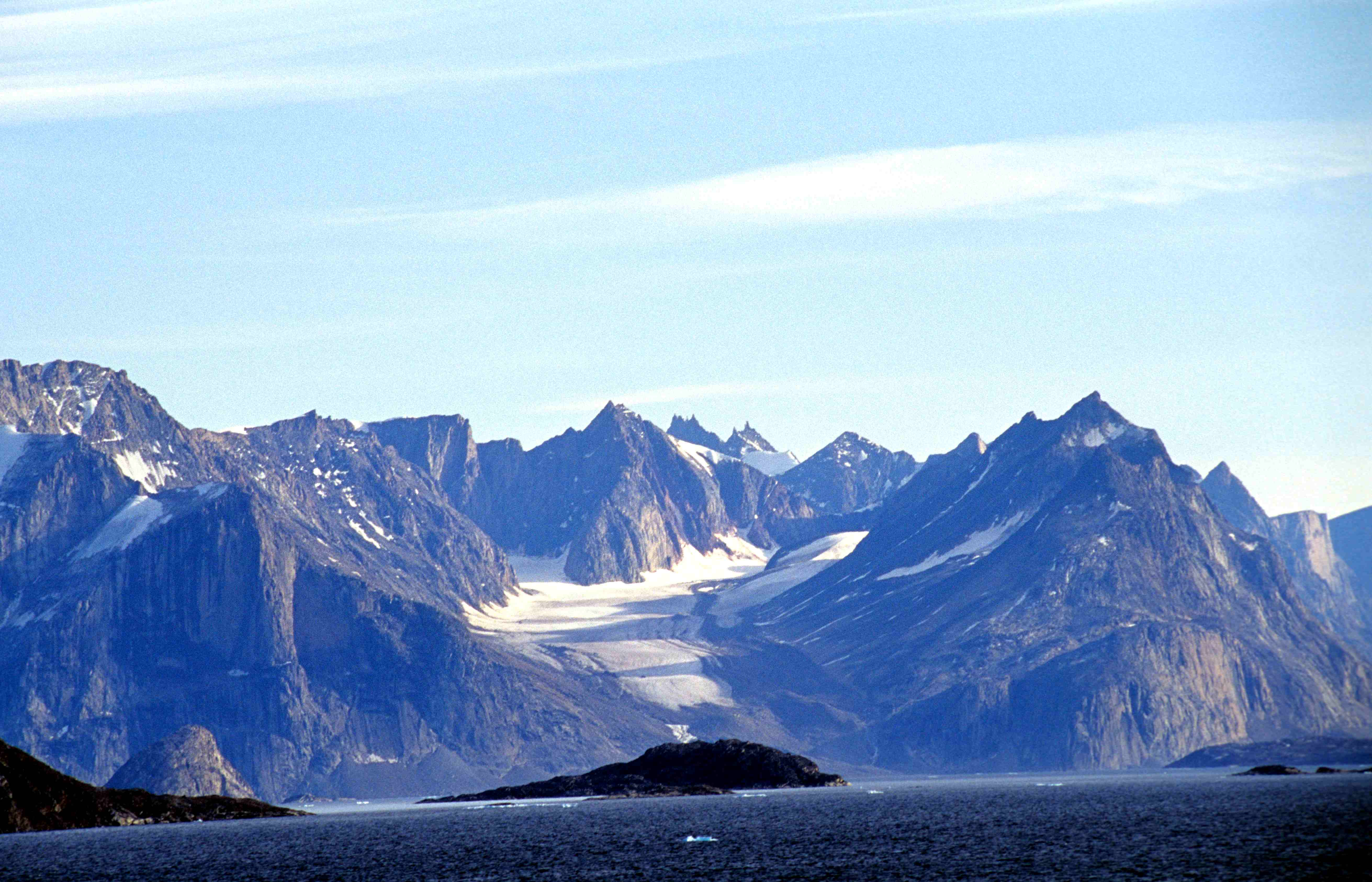
Nedlukseak Fiord (Davis Strait) and view to the mountains

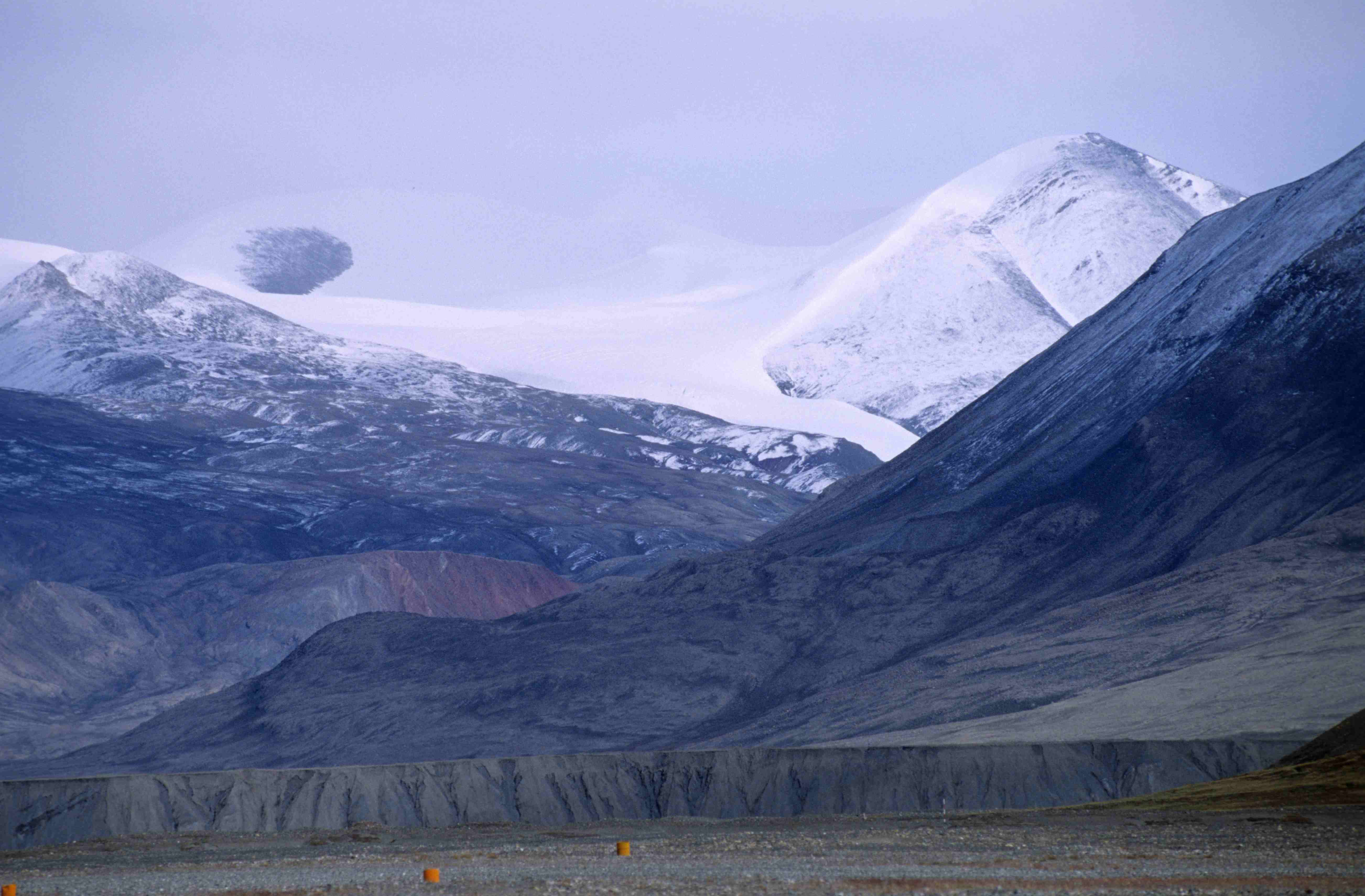
The Conger Range and Ad Astra Icecap

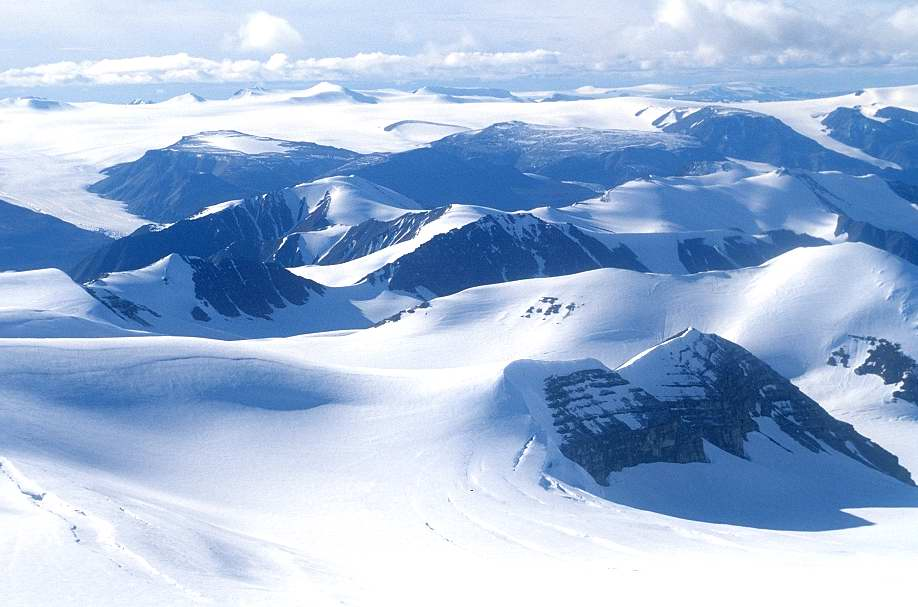
The Osborn Range seen from a Twin Otter

=== Axel Heiberg Island ===
- Geodetic Hills
- Joy Range
- Princess Margaret Range
- Swiss Range
- White Triplets Peaks

=== Baffin Island ===
- Baffin Mountains
- Bruce Mountains
- Everett Mountains
- Hartz Mountains
- Krag Mountains
- Precipitous Mountains

=== Bathurst Island ===
- Grogan Morgan Range
- Jeffries Range
- Scoresby Hills
- Stokes Range

=== Bylot Island ===
- Byam Martin Mountains

=== Devon Island ===
- Cunningham Mountains
- Douro Range
- Grinnell Range
- Haddington Range
- Treuter Mountains

=== Ellesmere Island ===
- Blackwelder Mountains
- Blue Mountains
- Boulder Hills
- British Empire Range
- Challenger Mountains
- Conger Range
- Garfield Range
- Inglefield Mountains
- Krieger Mountains
- Osborn Range
- Prince of Wales Mountains
- Sawtooth Range
- Thorndike Peaks
- United States Range
- Victoria and Albert Mountains

=== Île Vanier ===
- Adam Range

=== Labrador and Quebec ===
- Torngat Mountains
  - Selamiut Range

== Flora and fauna ==
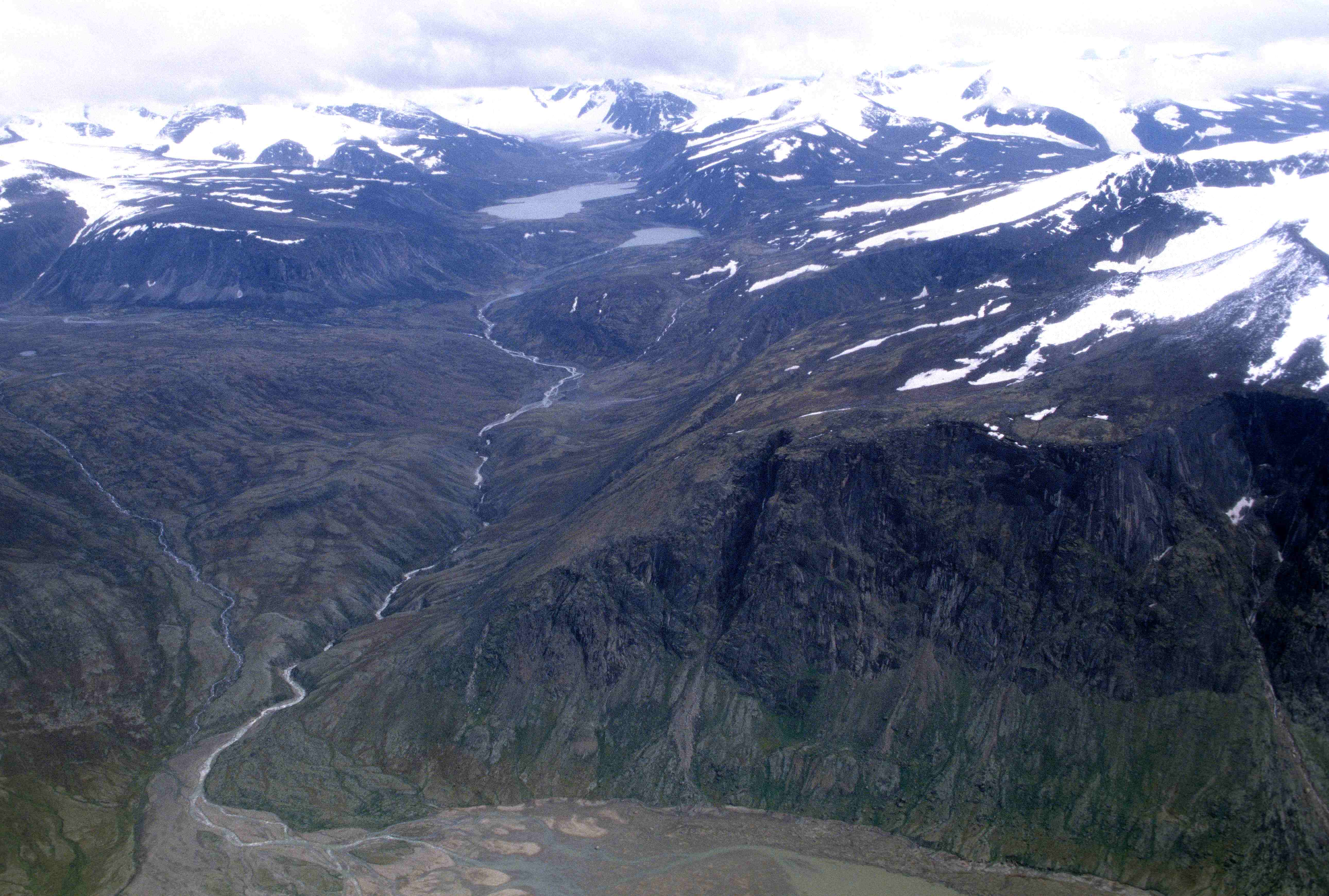
Qijuttaaqanngittuq Valley in the southern Baffin Mountains

Not much can grow in the severe environment, where killing frost can come at any time during the year and even soil is rare. Three-quarters of the land is bare rock, and even lichen have a hard time of it. Trees are hardly noticeable. Plants that do grow in the region are mostly tiny species that often grow in thick Insulating mats to protect themselves from the cold or are covered in thick hairs that help to insulate and to protect them from the harsh wind.

Some of the plant species found are Arctic black spruce, Arctic willow, cottongrass, crustose lichens, kobresia, moss species, wood rush, wire rush, purple saxifrage, Dryas species such as mountain avens, sedges, Diapensia lapponica, Arctic poppy, mountain sorrel, river beauty, moss campion, bilberry, and Arctic white heather.

The conditions here are far too severe for reptiles and amphibians to survive; insects are also rare in the region. Muskoxen and barren-ground caribou are the only large herbivores in this environment, while polar bears and the Arctic wolf are the only large carnivores to be found in the region. Smaller herbivores include the Arctic hare and the collared lemming. Arctic foxes and stoats are some of the smaller carnivores found in the region. Marine mammals include narwhals, beluga whales, walrus along with ringed and bearded seals.

The furry-legged rock ptarmigan is a widespread bird in this region. Typical birds of prey include the gyrfalcon and snowy owl. Some of the more widespread shore- and seabirds are the thick-billed murre, black-legged kittiwake, ruddy turnstone, red knot, black guillemot, widespread ringed plover, little ringed plover and northern fulmar. Songbirds found in the Arctic Cordillera include the hoary redpoll, common redpoll, snow bunting, and Lapland longspur. The snow goose, common and king eider, and red-throated loon are some species of waterfowl that live in the region.

=== Plant communities ===
The Arctic Cordillera is a very high stress environment for plants to try and grow and regenerate. Vegetation is largely absent due to permanent ice and snow. Due to the extremely cold, dry climate, along with the ice-fields and lack of soil materials, the high and mid-elevations are largely devoid of significant populations of plants. In the warmer valleys at low elevations and along coastal margins, the plant cover is more extensive, consisting of herbaceous and shrub-type communities. Stream-banks and coastlines are the most biologically productive areas here. The plants in this region have a history of being survivors and stress tolerant to high winds, low temperatures, few available macronutrients like nitrogen and phosphorus. Plants have adaptations such as fluffy seed masses, staying low to the ground, and use of other plant masses for extra insulation.

=== Keystone species ===
Due to the harsh environments and extremely low temperatures that encompass the Arctic Cordillera, there is not a large variety of plants and animals that are able to survive and exist as stable populations. However, some animal species, both herbivores and carnivores, are able to survive the extreme weather and terrain. Among these animals are wolves, polar bears, Arctic foxes, musk-oxen, and caribou. For the most part, the large carnivores are the dominant species in the ecoregion, mainly the polar bear. With a population of approximately 22,000, the polar bear is the keystone species for the area due to its intimate relationship with the ice as well as its intelligent hunting tactics. As long as the polar bear exists, it will be the keystone species of the Arctic Cordillera. However, this existence relies solely on the degree of ice melt in the future.

=== Endangered species ===
==== Polar bear ====
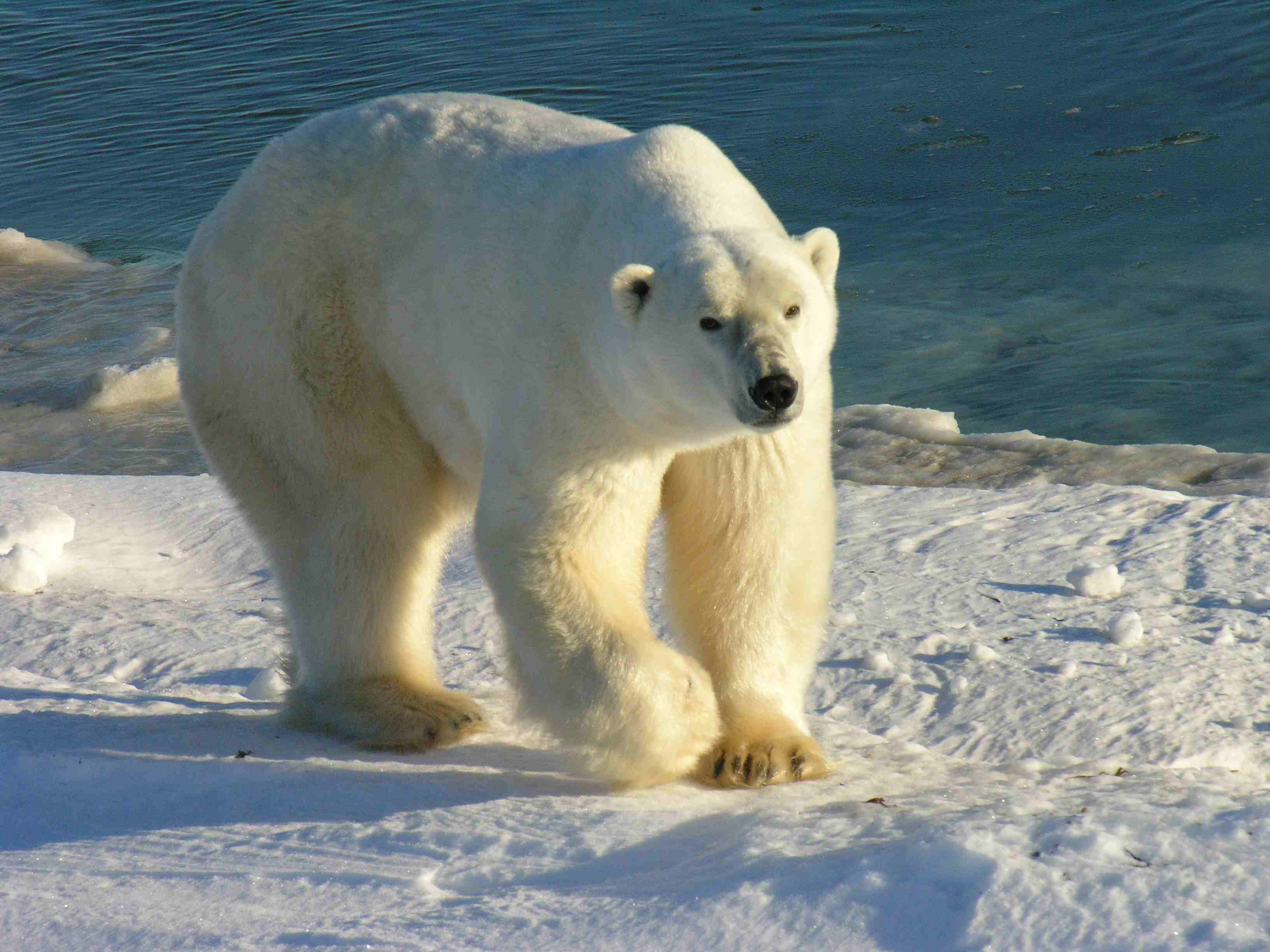
Polar bear

The polar bear is one of the most notably affected species in the Arctic Cordillera, mainly due to their heavy reliance on arctic ice for hunting and bedding grounds. Habitat loss, caused by global warming, has led to many dangerous behavioural changes including a new behaviour called long swims. These are swims lasting as long as ten days performed by mother bears to attempt to find food for their cubs, which generally lead to the death of the cub. Because of their stature and aggressiveness, direct conservation practices are not very useful to the polar bear. Instead, scientific observation to better understand these animals is the largest form of traditional conservation.

==== Arctic black spruce ====
The Arctic black spruce is an example of a plant native to the Arctic Cordillera that is considered to be in ecological decline. The black spruce is a species of least concern because of habitat loss and deforestation from the spruce budworm moth. In the Arctic Cordillera however, the black spruce population is in good health, and is slowly gaining habitat through the retreat of polar ice.

==== Bowhead whale ====
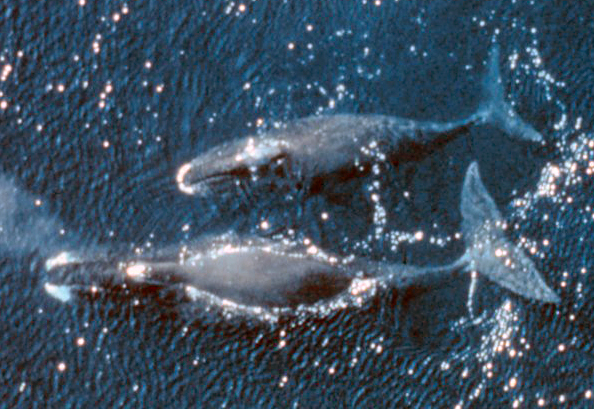
Bowhead whales

Another species that is of great importance to this ecoregion is the endangered Bowhead whale (Balaena mysticetus). Five total stocks of this species exist in the region within the arctic oceans and adjacent seas: the Spitsbergen stock, Baffin Bay/Davis Strait, stock and Hudson Bay/Foxe Basin Stock, Sea of Okhotsk Stock, and the Bering/Chukchi/Beaufort Stock. Historically, these whales have served as a cultural icon, and an important source of food and fuel to the Inuit. At this point in time, their populations were estimated between 30,000 and 50,000 individuals.

However, with the expansion of commercial whaling in the 16th and 17th century, this species was exploited to dangerously low numbers. Commercial hunting of bowheads was officially ended in 1921, when moratoria were established to protect the remaining 3,000 individuals left in the wild.

Today, those same moratoria are still in effect, but the Bowhead population has been reinstated to a manageable population of between 7,000 and 10,000 individuals. Nonetheless, these whales have been (and remain) on the IUCN Red List since 1984. One of the most important conservation efforts for this species is "legal" protection by the International Convention for the Regulation of Whaling, which came into force in 1935. This convention was further strengthened and ratified by Canada in 1977 to support the International Whaling Commission’s (IWC) recommendation for full protection of the bowhead whale. Further conservation efforts have involved more physically demanding solutions, including the recommended funding of specialized technical machines that have the capability to remove debris that commonly kills these whales due to entanglement and accidental indigestion.

== Climate ==
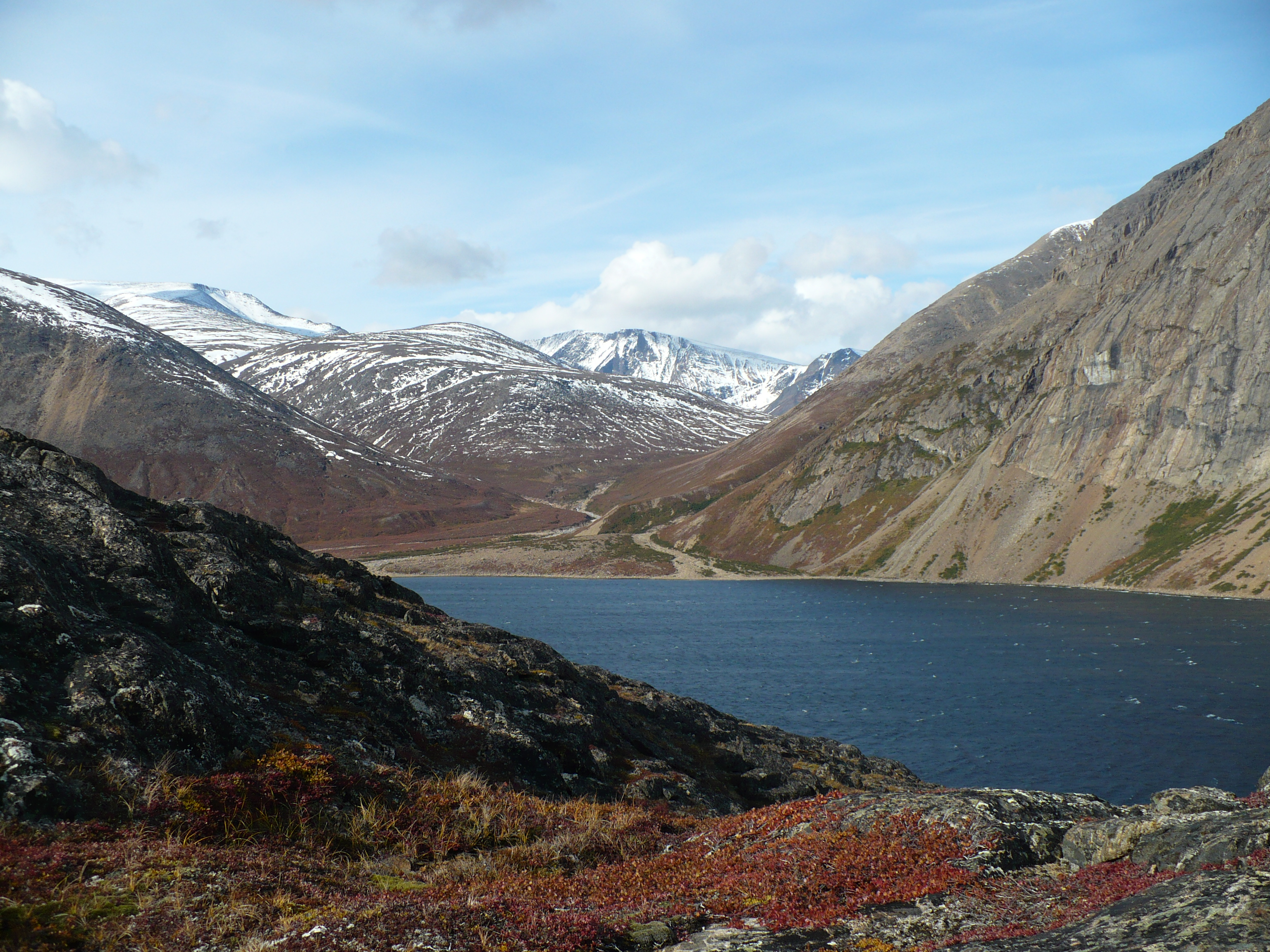
Nachvak Fjord, Torngat Mountains

The Arctic Cordillera has one of Canada's most inhospitable climates. The weather is generally very cold and dry with a few weeks of sun and rain in the summer. Snow is the most common form of precipitation in the Cordillera. The region only gets 20−60 centimeters of precipitation annually. The temperature in this ecoregion averages around 4 degrees Celsius during the summer. Winter is very dark and long, when temperatures average at −35 °C (−31 °F), although it is somewhat milder and more humid in its southernmost portions. A polar cell is a system of winds that influence the climate of the Cordillera. It is made up of the Westerlies, which are winds that blow warm air east to west from 30 to 60 degrees latitude up to the poles, and the Polar Easterlies, which blow cold air back south where it will repeat the process.

It was not always as cold as it is today. Tree stumps were discovered in 1985 on Axel Heiberg Island dating back 40 million years, indicating this northerly part of the cordillera was warmer and wetter than its present-day climate, with much more biodiversity.

== Natural resources and human influence ==
Only about 2,600 people live in the region, found primarily in the communities of Clyde River, Qikiqtarjuaq (formerly known as Broughton Island), and Pond Inlet. These communities are rather small, with the populations being 820, 473 and 1,315 respectively in 2006. Most of the people who live in the region survive by hunting, fishing, and trapping.

The Arctic Cordillera is a cold, harsh environment making plant life and animal-life sparse; even soil is rare in this ecoregion. Moss, cottongrass, and Arctic heather are examples of plant life that can be found in valleys. Meanwhile, polar bears, seals, and walruses roam the shores and survive off the thriving marine ecosystem. Fish, clams, and shrimp are just a few of the resources the local Inuit communities of Nunavut use in the highly productive waters to support their economy. Nunavut's government is also investing in exploration of mineral resources; Breakwater Resources, for example, has Nanisivik Mine, a zinc-lead mine in Arctic Bay that just reopened in April 2003 after closing the year before due to declining resources. Climate change is the strongest human influence in the Arctic Cordillera. Rising temperatures in the Arctic are causing ice shelves, and the habitats they provide, to shrink from year to year. Researchers of global warming also express concern for the economic, political, and social consequences of the resulting decline in fisheries stocks expected because of the changing climate.

== See also ==
- List of mountain ranges
- Geography of Nunavut
- Geography of Newfoundland and Labrador
- Geography of Canada
- Ledoyom (Ice body)
