= North Kent Island =

Uninhabited island in the Arctic Archipelago

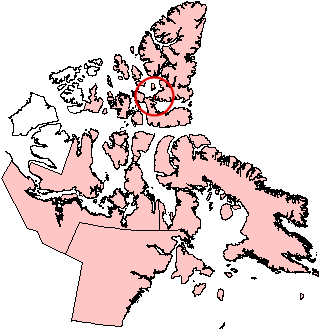
- North Kent Island, Nunavut.

- Location within Nunavut Location within Canada

Geography
- Location: Cardigan Strait
- Coordinates: 76°40′N 090°15′W
- Archipelago: Queen Elizabeth Islands; Arctic Archipelago
- Area: 590 km^{2} (230 sq mi)
- Length: 42 km (26.1 mi)
- Width: 23 km (14.3 mi)
- Highest elevation: 600 m (2000 ft)

Administration
- Canada
- Nunavut: Nunavut
- Region: Qikiqtaaluk

Demographics
- Population: Uninhabited

North Kent Island is one of the uninhabited Queen Elizabeth Islands in the Canadian arctic islands in the Qikiqtaaluk Region of Nunavut, Canada. It is located in the Cardigan Strait between Devon Island's Colin Archer Peninsula and Ellesmere Island's Simmons Peninsula.

== Geography ==
The 590 km^{2} (230 sq mi) island's terrain is flat-topped and ice-capped, with steep cliffs.

== Fauna ==
North Kent Island is a Canadian Important Bird Area (#NU052), and an International Biological Program site. Notable bird species include black guillemot, common eider, glaucous gull, and Thayer's gull.

Walrus, bearded seal, ringed seal, and narwhal frequent the area.
