= Cape Vera =

Peninsula in Nunavut, Canada

Coordinates: 76°13′59″N 089°13′00″W

Cape Vera is an uninhabited headland on Devon Island, in the Qikiqtaaluk Region of Nunavut, Canada. Protruding off the island's northwestern Colin Archer Peninsula, it faces Jones Sound. Often, a polynya forms in the Cardigan Strait, a waterway that separates the cape from North Kent Island.

== Geography ==
Cape Vera, approximately 8 km (5 mi) in size, with an elevation up to 245 m (804 ft) above sea level, is characterized by open sea, coastal cliffs, grassy to bare-rock cliff ledges, scree, and boulders. The rocky, marine shore, of limestone formation, is approximately 300 ft (91 m) in width.

== Fauna ==
The cape is notable as a Canadian Important Bird Area (#NU053), an International Biological Program site (Region 9, #2-11) and a Key Migratory Bird Terrestrial Habitat site. Notable bird species include the northern fulmar and common eider. Colonial seabirds are also attracted to this remote, High Arctic site.

== History ==
Archeological sites have been found near the base of the cape.
