= Douro Range =

Mountain range in Nunavut, Canada

- Location within Nunavut

Highest point
- Coordinates: 76°20′05″N 92°44′02″W

Geography
- Country: Canada
- Region: Nunavut
- Parent range: Arctic Cordillera

The Douro Range is a small mountain range on northwestern Devon Island, Nunavut, Canada. It is one of the northernmost mountain ranges in the world which in turn form part of the Arctic Cordillera mountain system.

== See also ==
- List of mountain ranges
