= Krieger =

Krieger (German, 'warrior') may refer to:

== People ==
- Krieger (surname), including a list of people with that surname

== Geography ==
- Krieger (crater), a lunar crater
- Krieger Mountains, in northern Ellesmere Island, Nunavut, Canada
- Kriegers Flak, a reef in the Baltic Sea

== Other uses ==
- "Krieger" (song), a 2003 song by And One
- Kriéger Company of Electric Vehicles
- Krieger-Nelson Prize a Canadian Mathematical Society award to outstanding women in mathematics

== See also ==
- .kkrieger, a first-person shooter
- Maschinen Krieger ZbV 3000, a science fiction universe created by Kow Yokoyama
- Kreiger (surname)
- Kruger (and Krüger), a surname
