= Grinnell Range =

Mountain range in Nunavut, Canada

- Location within Nunavut

Highest point
- Elevation: 546 m (1,791 ft)
- Coordinates: 76°32′06″N 94°02′34″W

Geography
- Country: Canada
- Region: Nunavut
- Parent range: Arctic Cordillera

The Grinnell Range is a mountain range on northwestern Devon Island, Nunavut, Canada. It is one of the northernmost mountain ranges in the world forming part of the Arctic Cordillera mountain system.

== See also ==
- List of mountain ranges
