= Joy Range =

Mountain range in Nunavut, Canada

- Location within Nunavut

Highest point
- Elevation: 1,802 m (5,912 ft)
- Coordinates: 79°15′07″N 87°19′58″W

Geography
- Country: Canada
- Region: Nunavut
- Parent range: Arctic Cordillera

The Joy Range is a mountain range of the Arctic Cordillera.

== Geography ==
The range is one of the northernmost mountain ranges in the world, along with the nearby Princess Margaret Range. It is located on southeastern Axel Heiberg Island, in Nunavut, Canada, North America.

== History ==
The range is named after Alfred Herbert Joy, who is best known for a remarkable 2,900 km (1,802 mi) patrol by dogsled across the heart of the Queen Elizabeth Islands in 1929.

== See also ==
- List of mountain ranges
