= Scoresby =

Scoresby may refer to:

== People ==
- Scoresby Shepherd (1935–2025), Australian lawyer and marine biologist
- William Scoresby (1789–1857), British Arctic explorer, scientist and clergyman
- William F. Scoresby (1840–1884), New York politician
- William Scoresby Routledge (1859–1939), British ethnographer, anthropologist and adventurer

== Places ==
- Scoresby (crater), Lunar crater
- Scoresby Bay, Nunavut, Canada
- Scoresby Hills, Nunavut, Canada
- Scoresby Point, South Georgia
- Scoresby Sound, a fjord in the Eastern coast of Greenland
- Scoresby, Victoria, Australia
  - former Electoral district of Scoresby
- William Scoresby Archipelago, Antarctica
- William Scoresby Bay, Antarctica

== Ships ==
- RRS William Scoresby, early 20th century British research vessel
- SS Scoresby (1923–1940), British steam merchant ship

== In fiction ==
- Lee Scoresby, a character in Philip Pullman's His Dark Materials series of books
