= Treuter Mountains =

Group of mountains in Nunavut, Canada

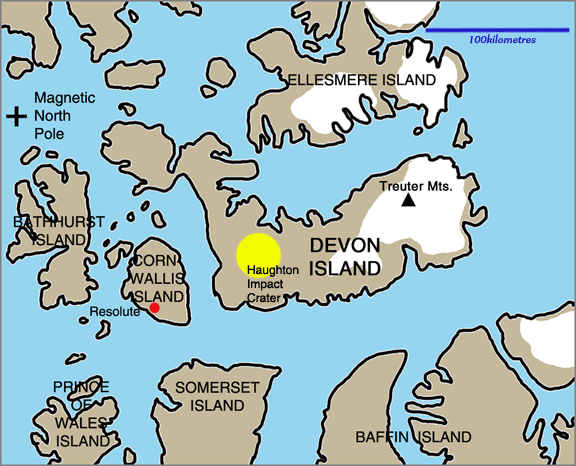
Map of the Devon Island region, including the Treuter Mountains

The Treuter Mountains (75°42′N 82°30′W), formerly known as the Truter Mountains and the Trenter Mountains, are a small mountain range on eastern Devon Island, Nunavut, Canada. The Treuter Mountains are part of the Devon Ice Cap which forms part of the Arctic Cordillera mountain range.

== See also ==
- List of mountain ranges of Canada
