= Radstock Bay =

Bay in Nunavut, Canada

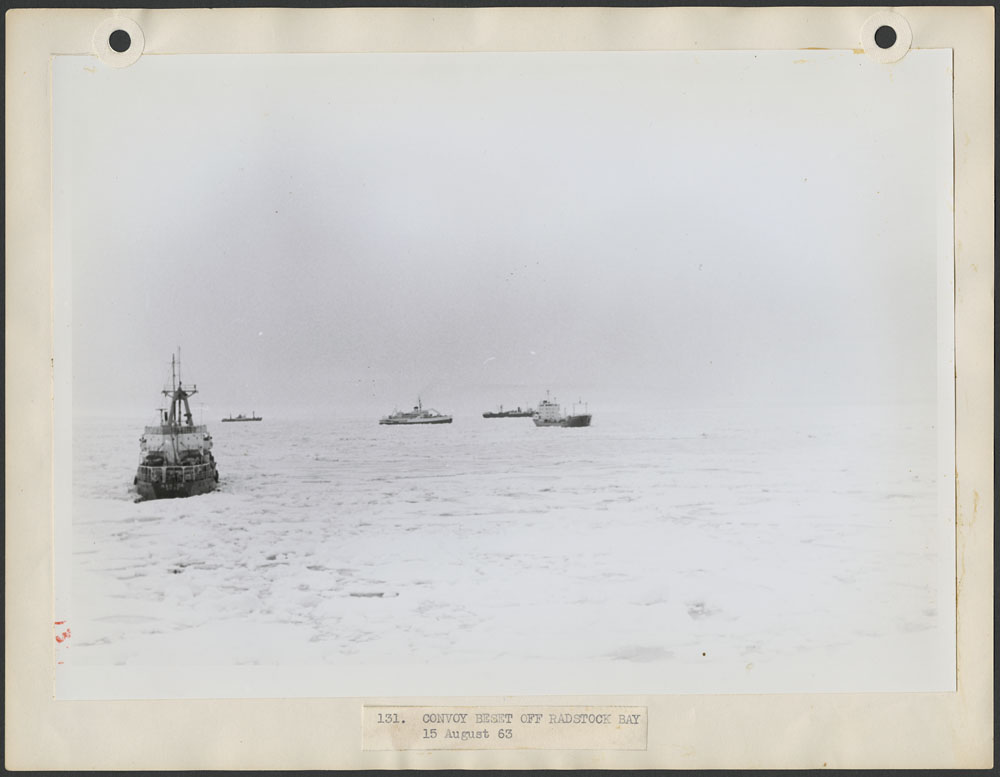
- A convoy beset off Radstock Bay

- Location within Nunavut
- Location: Lancaster Sound
- Coordinates: 74°45′N 91°00′W
- Ocean/sea sources: Arctic Ocean
- Basin countries: Canada
- Settlements: Uninhabited

Radstock Bay is a waterway located in the Qikiqtaaluk Region, Nunavut, Canada. It lies off the southern coast of Devon Island in the eastern high Arctic. Like Maxwell Bay to the east, it is an arm of Lancaster Sound and Barrow Strait.

Cape Liddon, on its western headland, has significant populations of black guillemot and northern fulmar.
