= Blackwelder =

Blackwelder may refer to:

People

- Eliot Blackwelder (1880–1969), American geologist
- Myra Blackwelder (born 1955), American professional golfer
- Richard E. Blackwelder (1909−2001), American entomologist

in geology

- Blackwelder Glacier, glacier in Antarctica.
- Mount Blackwelder, Antarctic mountain.
- Blackwelder Mountains, in Nunavut

in other uses:

- Blackwelder, a musical group fronted by former Primal Fear singer Ralf Scheepers
