= Cunningham Mountains =

Group of mountains in Nunavut, Canada

- Location within Nunavut

Geography
- Country: Canada
- Region: Nunavut
- Range coordinates: 74°40′N 81°10′W
- Parent range: Arctic Cordillera

The Cunningham Mountains are a small mountain range on the southeastern coast of Devon Island, Nunavut, Canada. The Cunningham Mountains are part of the Devon Ice Cap which forms part of the Arctic Cordillera mountain range.

== See also ==
- List of mountain ranges
