= Agassiz Ice Cap =

Ice cap in Nunavut, Canada

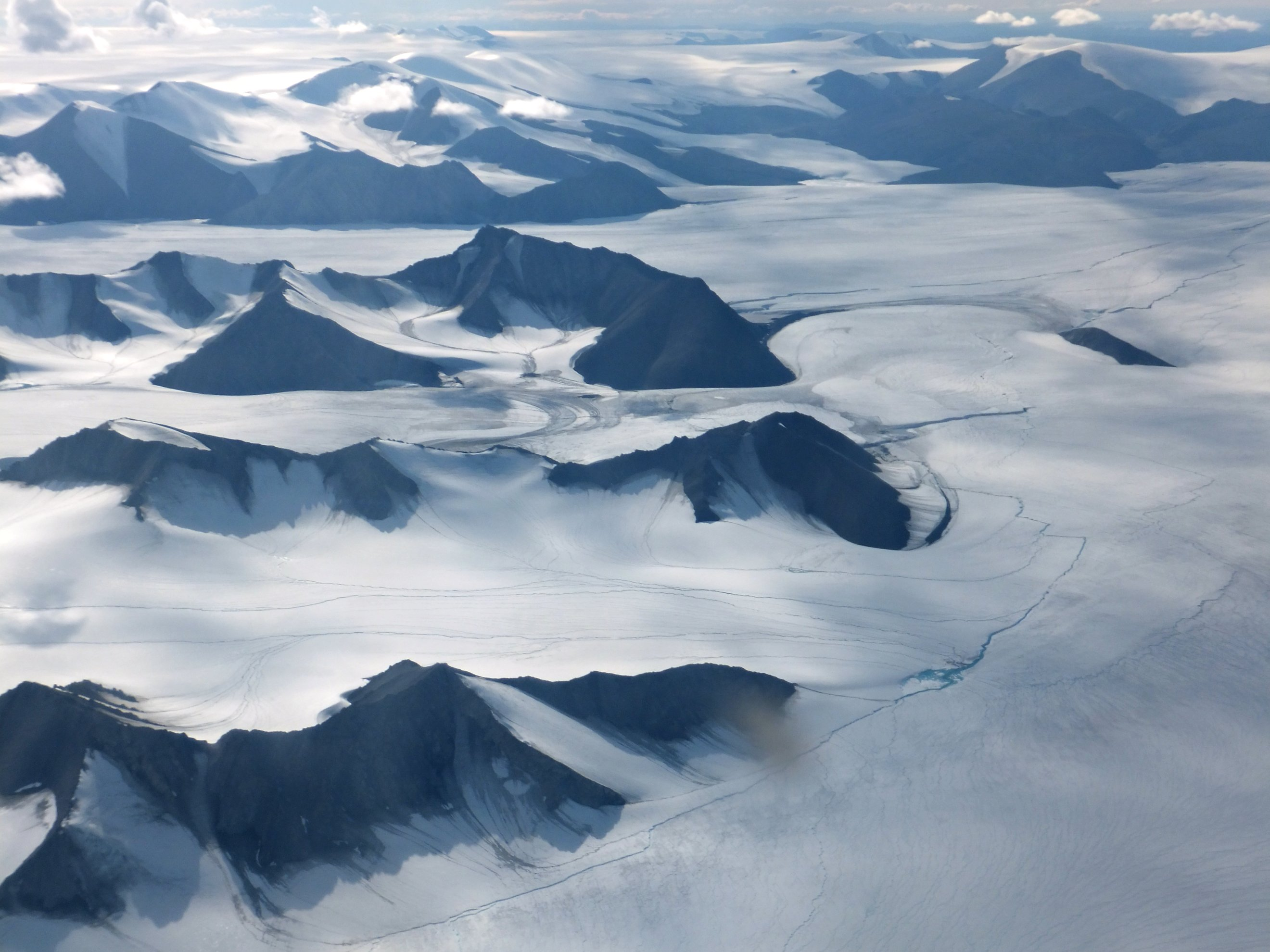
- Agassiz Ice Cap

- Location within Nunavut
- Type: Ice cap
- Location: Nunavut, Canada
- Coordinates: 80°15′N 076°00′W

The Agassiz Ice Cap formerly Agassiz Glacier is an ice cap on the central eastern side of Ellesmere Island, Nunavut, Canada. The Agassiz ice cap is about 21,000 km^{2} (8,100 sq mi) in area. It is located between the North Ellesmere ice field to the north and the Prince of Wales Icefield to the south.

== Environmental studies ==
Several studies have been conducted which involve the analysis of ice cores extracted from the Agassiz Ice cap. Many of these studies are focused around climate change.
