= Krag Mountains =

Group of mountains in Nunavut, Canada

Highest point
- Coordinates: 71°53′04″N 80°24′54″W

Geography
- Country: Canada
- Region: Nunavut
- Parent range: Arctic Cordillera

The Krag Mountains are a mountain range on northern Baffin Island, Nunavut, Canada. It is part of a much larger mountain range called the Baffin Mountains which in turn form part of the Arctic Cordillera mountain system.

== See also ==
- List of mountain ranges
