= Cape Liddon =

Headland in Nunavut, Canada

Coordinates: 74°37′59″N 091°04′59″W

Cape Liddon is an uninhabited headland on Devon Island in the Qikiqtaaluk Region of Nunavut, Canada. It is located on the southwestern coast of the island at Radstock Bay.

== Geography ==
The habitat is characterized by open sea, rocky marine shores, and Silurian limestone coastal cliffs that rise to an elevation of 300 m (980 ft) above sea level. It is 3.5 km (2.2 mi) in size.

== Fauna ==
The cape is a Canadian Important Bird Area (#NU059), an International Biological Program site (Region 9, #2-15) and a Key Migratory Bird Terrestrial Habitat Site. Notable bird species include black guillemot and northern fulmar.
