= Blue Mountains (Nunavut) =

Mountain range in Nunavut, Canada

- Location within Nunavut

Highest point
- Coordinates: 80°44′0″N 85°35′0″W

Geography
- Country: Canada
- Region: Nunavut
- Parent range: Arctic Cordillera

The Blue Mountains are a small mountain range on Ellesmere Island, Nunavut, Canada. It is a subrange of the Arctic Cordillera. The Blue Mountains contain Mesozoic stratigraphy.

== See also ==
- List of mountain ranges
