= Osborn Range =

Mountain range in Nunavut, Canada

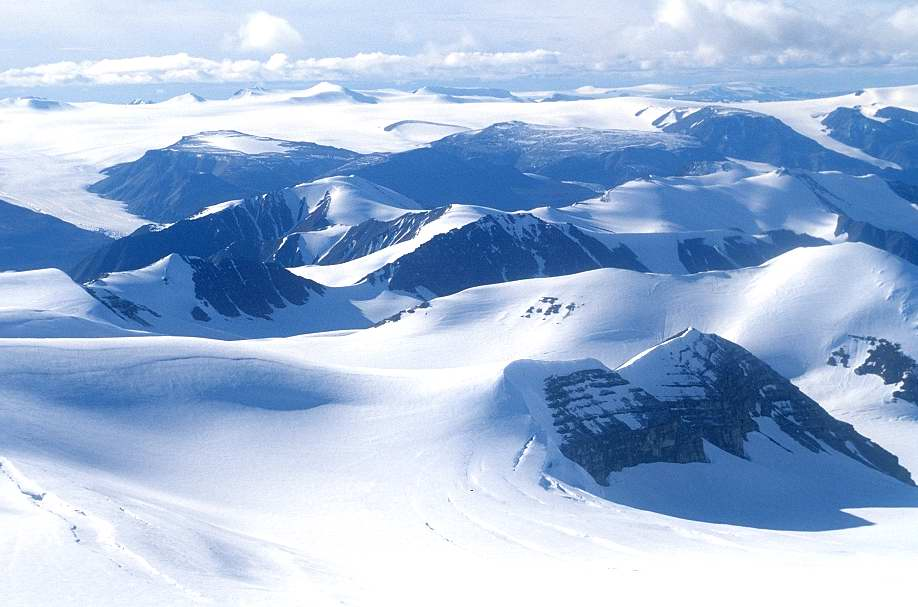
- The Osborn Range

Highest point
- Peak: Unnamed peak
- Elevation: 1,757 m (5,764 ft)
- Coordinates: 81°25′07″N 78°24′48″W

Geography
- Location within Nunavut
- Country: Canada
- Territory: Nunavut
- Range coordinates: 81°25′N 78°25′W
- Parent range: Arctic Cordillera
- Topo map: NTS 340D5 Bent Glacier

The Osborn Range is a small mountain range located on the northwest flank of Tanquary Fiord on north-central Ellesmere Island, Nunavut, Canada. It lies just outside Quttinirpaaq National Park and is one of the northernmost mountain ranges in the world forming part of the Arctic Cordillera.

The only named summit in the Osborn Range is Mount Townsend 1,235 m (4,052 ft) at the southwest edge of the Osborn Range near McKinley Bay, formed by the Chapman Glacier.

A well-known glacier called Gull Glacier lies in the Conger Range.

== See also ==
- List of mountain ranges
