= Bruce Mountains =

Mountain range in Nunavut, Canada

- Location within Nunavut

Highest point
- Elevation: 457 m (1,499 ft)

Geography
- Country: Canada
- Territory: Nunavut
- Range coordinates: 71°10′N 72°30′W
- Parent range: Baffin Mountains
- Topo map: NTS 37H1 (untitled)

The Bruce Mountains are a small mountain range on the northeast coast of Baffin Island, Nunavut, Canada. It is a subrange of the Baffin Mountains which in turn form part of the Arctic Cordillera mountain range.
