= Inglefield Mountains =

Group of mountains in Nunavut, Canada

Coordinates: 77°35′N 79°20′W

- Location within Nunavut

Highest point
- Elevation: 1,500 m (4,900 ft)

Geography
- Country: Canada
- Region: Nunavut
- Parent range: Arctic Cordillera

The Inglefield Mountains are a mountain range in southeastern Ellesmere Island, Nunavut, Canada. The mountain range is mostly covered by ice fields, with granitic nunataks reaching a height of 1,500 m (4,921 ft) above sea level. Rocky cliffs border the coastal areas. Like most other mountain ranges in the Canadian Arctic, the Inglefield Mountains are part of the Arctic Cordillera.

There have been very few sightings of wildlife in the Inglefield Mountains because the mountains are north of the Arctic tree line and because of the harsh cold climate. However, the areas nunataks may support one-third of the nationally vulnerable Canadian ivory gull population. During the 1980s, the rock outcrops supported between 730 and 830 adult ivory gulls.

== See also ==
- List of mountain ranges
