= Garfield Range =

Mountain range in Nunavut, Canada

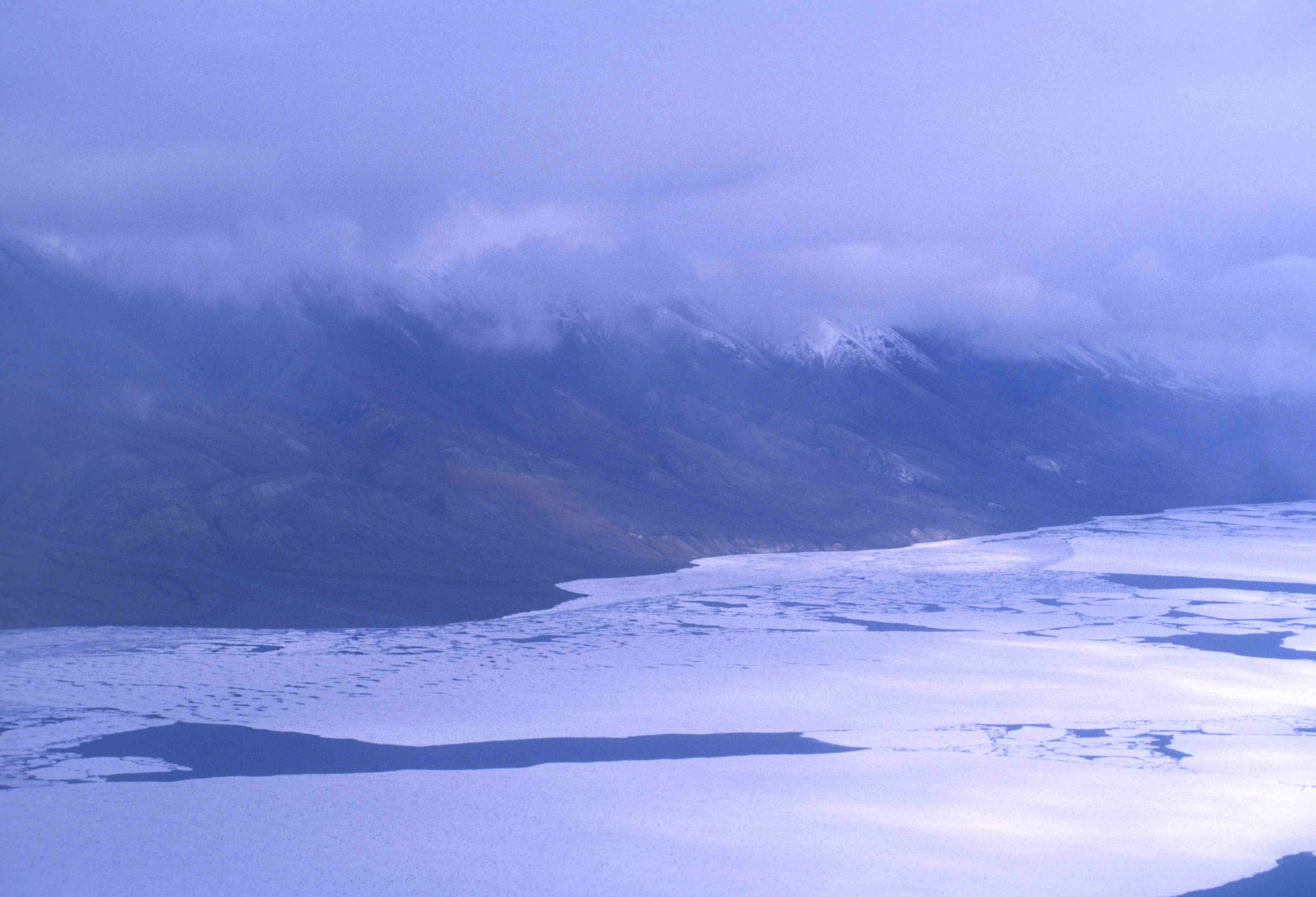
- Western part of Lake Hazen (Summer 1997); Quttinirpaaq National Park, Nunavut, Canada

Geography
- Location within Nunavut
- Country: Canada
- Territory: Nunavut
- Range coordinates: 81°48′N 72°40′W
- Parent range: Arctic Cordillera
- Topo map: NTS 340D16 Henrietta Nesmith Glacier

The Garfield Range is a mountain range on Ellesmere Island, Nunavut, Canada. The mountains are made of Paleozoic rocks and rise to heights between 1,067 m (3,501 ft) and 1,433 m (4,701 ft) and are separated by valleys through which flow the major rivers fed by the ice fields and glaciers. Like most of the mountain ranges in the Arctic, it is one of the world's northernmost mountain ranges.

The Garfield Range is located at Lake Hazen which is the world's largest lake north of the Arctic Circle by volume and acts as a barrier between the lake and the Grant Land ice cap and nunataks of the United States Range to the north. The Gilman Glacier is one of the largest glaciers draining into Lake Hazen. To the east, the mountain range extends across the Hazen Plateau while, to the west, it runs virtually to the head of Tanquary Fiord. The mountains, which tower as much as 1,500 m (4,921 ft) above Lake Hazen, typically consists of steep snow-free slopes facing south, with north-facing slopes of shallow gradients covered in snow and ice. At intervals, the range is bisected by broad valleys 5 to 8 km (3.1 to 5.0 mi) in width that are occasionally filled by glacial tongues, such as the monumental Henrieta Nesmith Glacier that descends to within 4 km (2 mi) of Lake Hazen near its northwestern end.

== See also ==
- List of mountain ranges
