= Thorndike Peaks =

Mountain range in Nunavut, Canada

Coordinates: 77°04′59″N 079°38′59″W

The Thorndike Peaks are a mountain range located south of the entrance to Makinson Inlet, on the east coast of Ellesmere Island, Nunavut, Canada. They are part of the Arctic Cordillera and are virtually unexplored. There are no trees or wildlife in the Thorndike Peaks because the mountains are north of the Arctic tree line and because of the harsh cold climate.

== See also ==
- List of mountain ranges
