= Devon Ice Cap =

Ice cap in Nunavut, Canada

- Location within Canada

Highest point
- Elevation
- Prominence: 1,920 m (6,300 ft)
- Listing: Canada most prominent peaks 46th; Canada most isolated peaks 23rd
- Coordinates: 75°20′52″N 82°10′26″W

Geography
- Location: Devon Island, Nunavut, Canada

Climbing
- First ascent: Alfred Herbert Joy and party, 1926

The Devon Ice Cap is an ice cap on eastern Devon Island, Nunavut, Canada, covering an area of over 12,000 km^{2} (4,600 sq mi). The highest point on Devon Island is found at the summit of the ice cap, with an elevation of 1,921 m (6,302 ft). The ice cap has a maximum thickness of 880 m (2,887 ft), and has been steadily shrinking since 1985.

The first ascent of the Devon Ice Cap was by Alfred Herbert Joy and his Inuit companions in 1926.

== Geology ==
The Devon Ice Cap and the Agassiz Ice Cap on the neighboring Ellesmere Island are two of the largest ice caps in the Arctic Cordillera in the Canadian Arctic, and consist of a substantial fraction of ice not locked away in the Antarctic and Greenland ice sheets. As such, should the entire Devon Ice Cap melt due to global warming, the ice will contribute approximately 1 centimeter to global sea level rise.

The Devon Ice Cap has a dome-like structure and a maximum elevation of 1921 m above sea level at its summit, and the maximum ice thickness is 880 m. There are two distinct regions in the Devon Ice Cap: a 12,050 km^{2} (4,650 sq mi) ice cap and a 1,960 km^{2} (760 sq mi) ice-covered region in the west that is geologically inactive. Beneath the ice, two hypersaline subglacial lakes have been identified via RES in bedrock troughs. Subglacial valleys have also been found, and such structures are thought to control the outflow of ice.

== See also ==
- Retreat of glaciers since 1850
- List of Ultras of North America
