= Jeffries Range =

Mountain range in Nunavut, Canada

- Location within Nunavut

Highest point
- Coordinates: 76°08′05″N 99°45′08″W

Geography
- Country: Canada
- Region: Nunavut
- Parent range: Arctic Cordillera

The Jeffries Range is a mountain range on Bathurst Island, Nunavut, Canada. It is one of the northernmost mountain ranges in the world which in turn form part of the Arctic Cordillera mountain system.

== See also ==
- List of mountain ranges
