= Cardigan Strait =

Canadian waterway

Coordinates: 76°37′59″N 090°40′00″W

Cardigan Strait is a narrow waterway in the territory of Nunavut. It lies between the eastern coast of Devon Island and the western coast of Ellesmere Island. Norwegian Bay opens to the north. North Kent Island is situated within the strait.

A polynya forms in Cardigan Strait most winters, used by wintering Bearded and Ringed seals, polar bears, and walrus. It's also frequented in the early portion of the breeding season by seabirds.
