= Colin Archer Peninsula =

Peninsula in Nunavut, Canada

Coordinates: 76°15′N 90°15′W

The Colin Archer Peninsula is located on the northwestern Devon Island, a part of the Qikiqtaaluk Region of the Canadian territory of Nunavut. It stretches eastward into Baffin Bay. It is named in honor of Colin Archer, naval architect and shipbuilder.

== Fauna and flora ==
The peninsula is frequented by wintering bearded seals, ringed seals, polar bears, and walrus.

Cape Vera, at the eastern end of the peninsula, is a breeding site for the northern fulmar.
