= Sawtooth Range (Nunavut) =

Mountain range in Nunavut, Canada

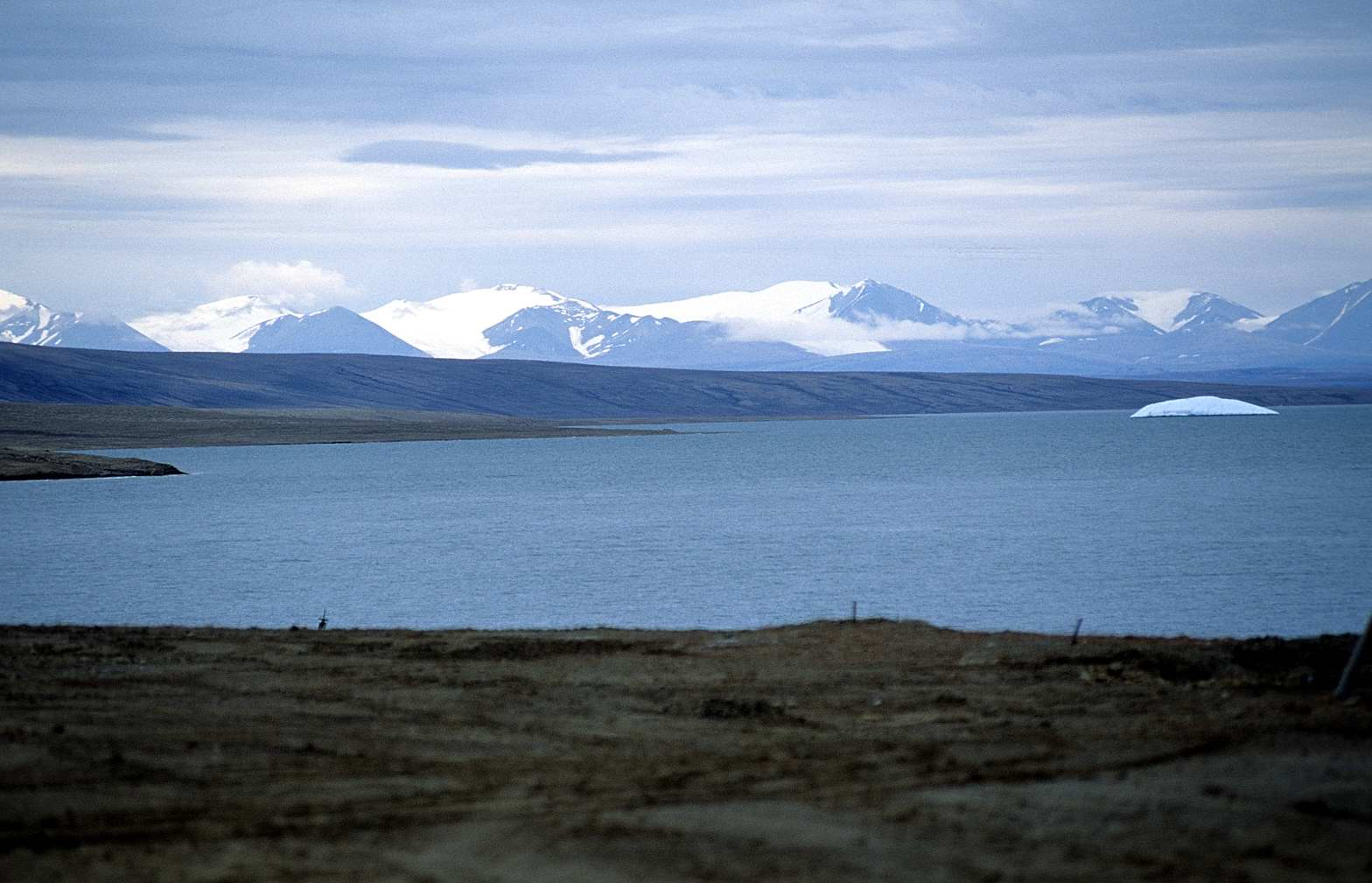
- Sawtooth Range; in front: Slidre Fiord and Fosheim Peninsula

Geography
- Location within Nunavut
- Country: Canada
- Region: Nunavut
- Range coordinates: 79°35′00″N 83°15′00″W
- Parent range: Arctic Cordillera

The Sawtooth Range is a jagged snow-capped mountain range on central Ellesmere Island, Nunavut, Canada. It lies between the Fosheim Peninsula and the Wolf Valley. The Sawtooth Range is a subrange of the Arctic Cordillera. It also runs through a Canadian Forces Station, called Eureka, a base used to study atmospheric changes.

== Geology ==
Widespread clastic deposits, 80–1,800 m (260–5,910 ft) long, on the eastern side of the Sawtooth Range are the result of debris flows and slushflows.

== Gallery ==
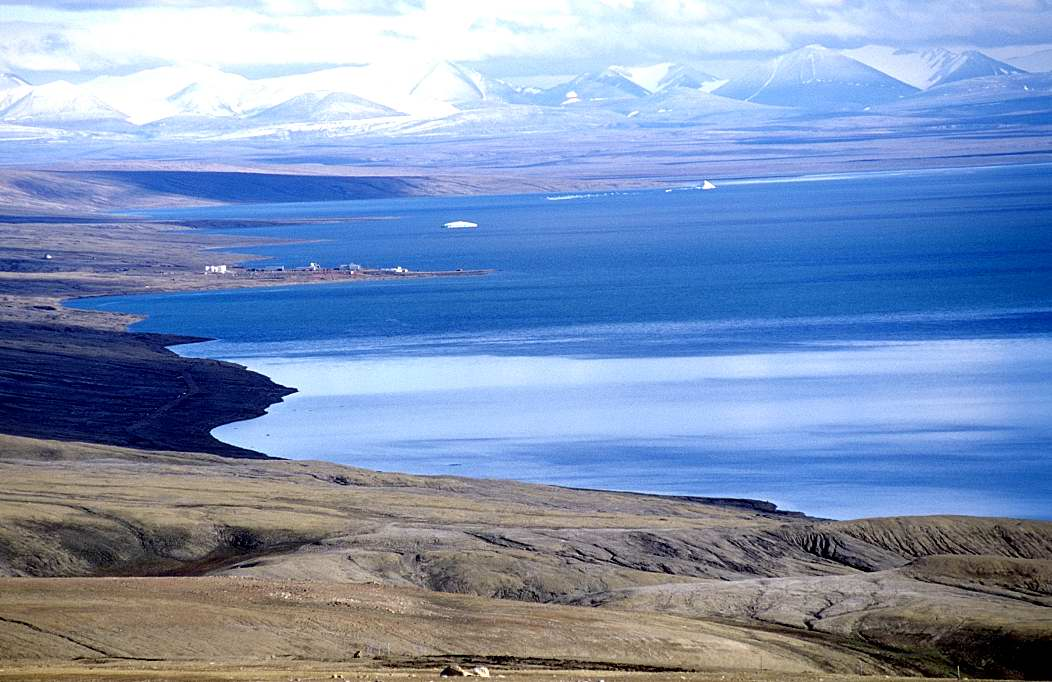
Slidre Fiord with Eureka Weather Station: Fosheim Peninsula and Sawtooth Range

== See also ==
- List of mountain ranges
