= Boulder Hills =

Mountain range in Nunavut, Canada

The Boulder Hills (82°12′07″N 67°11′32″W) are a mountain range in northeastern Quttinirpaaq National Park, Ellesmere Island, Nunavut, Canada. It is associated with the Arctic Cordillera mountain system.
