= Geodetic Hills =

Mountain range in Nunavut, Canada

The Geodetic Hills (79°48′37″N 89°59′01″W) are a mountain range on central Axel Heiberg Island, Nunavut, Canada. It is associated with the Arctic Cordillera mountain system.

In 1995, scientists advocated the hills be managed by the Canadian Parks Service and be annexed to the Ellesmere Island National Park Reserve.
