= Haddington Range =

Mountain range in Nunavut, Canada

- Location within Nunavut

Highest point
- Coordinates: 76°33′N 92°35′W

Geography
- Country: Canada
- Region: Nunavut
- Parent range: Arctic Cordillera

The Haddington Range is a mountain range on northeastern Devon Island, Nunavut, Canada. It is one of the northernmost mountain ranges in the world forming part of the Arctic Cordillera mountain system.

== See also ==
- List of mountain ranges of Canada
