= Grogan Morgan Range =

Mountain range on Bathurst Island, Nunavut, Canada

- Location within Nunavut

Highest point
- Coordinates: 76°26′05″N 100°25′09″W

Geography
- Country: Canada
- Region: Nunavut
- Parent range: Arctic Cordillera

The Grogan Morgan Range is a mountain range on the northern Bathurst Island, Nunavut, Canada. It is one of the northernmost mountain ranges in the world which in turn form part of the Arctic Cordillera mountain system.

== See also ==
- List of mountain ranges
