= Precipitous Mountains =

Mountain range in Nunavut, Canada

- Location within Nunavut

Highest point
- Coordinates: 72°33′04″N 80°59′55″W

Geography
- Country: Canada
- Region: Nunavut
- Range coordinates: 72°33′N 81°00′W
- Parent range: Arctic Cordillera
- Topo map: NTS 48A9 Alfred Point

The Precipitous Mountains are a mountain range on northern Baffin Island, Nunavut, Canada. It lies in, or near, Sirmilik National Park and is a subrange of the Arctic Cordillera.

== See also ==
- List of mountain ranges
