= Krieger Mountains =

Mountain range in Nunavut, Canada

- Location within Nunavut

Highest point
- Coordinates: 80°54′07″N 82°39′53″W

Geography
- Country: Canada
- Territory: Nunavut
- Parent range: Arctic Cordillera

The Krieger Mountains are a mountain range near Oobloyah Bay in northern Ellesmere Island, Nunavut, Canada. The Kriegar Mountains contain Mesozoic stratigraphy.

== See also ==
- List of mountain ranges
- Arctic Cordillera
