= Icelandite =

Igneous rock type

Icelandite is a type of volcanic rock, an andesite that is enriched in iron but deficient in aluminium (< 16.5% Al_{2}O_{3}). Icelandites are between tholeiitic dacite and tholeiitic basalt in composition and contain andesine, hypersthene and augite, with a silica (SiO_{2}) content greater than 60%.

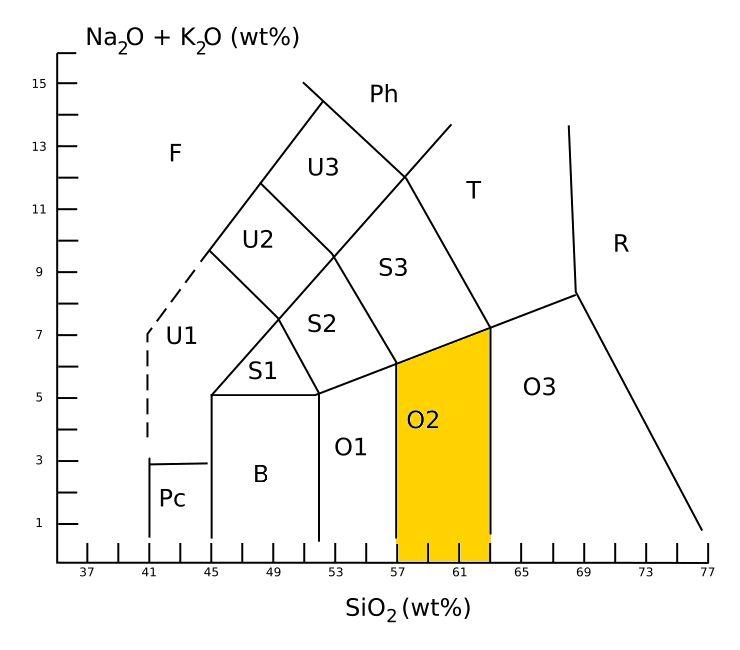
Icelandite is field O2 in the TAS classification.

The name was coined by the British geologist Ian S. E. Carmichael (who later became professor at the University of California, Berkeley) while working around 1960 on his PhD thesis at a Cenozoic volcano near the parsonage Thingmuli (Þingmúli) in East Iceland. For continental cogenetic series of volcanic rocks it is generally the case that the concentration of iron decreases with increasing silica content, but at Þingmúli the opposite was true, leading Carmichael to the conclusion that the iron-rich intermediate rock deserved its own name, icelandite.

With its elevated iron content and low aluminium content compared with calc-alkaline andesite, icelandite is assigned instead to the tholeiitic magma series.
