= Bravo Lake Formation =

Large igneous province on Baffin Island, Nunavut, Canada

Coordinates: 68°31′N 073°18′W

The Bravo Lake Formation is a mafic volcanic belt and large igneous province located at the northern margin of the Trans-Hudson orogeny on central Baffin Island, Nunavut, Canada. It is exposed along a nearly continuous east–west passage for 120 km (75 mi) and changes in stratigraphic thickness from 1 to 2.5 kilometers. The formation is a rare alkaline-suite that formed as a result of submarine rifting during the Paleoproterozoic period. The Bravo Lake Formation is surprisingly undeformed by the Himalayan-scale forming event during the Trans-Hudsonian orogeny.

The stratigraphy of the Bravo Lake Formation starts with a basic section of iron-oxide rich sandstones, psammites, and semi-pelites which cover a series of deformed pillow lavas which expand in viscosity towards the west, and volcanic/clastic deposits and ultramafic sills. The lower volcanic section is covered by garnet and diopside bearing calc–silicate layers and finely layered metasediments composed of coarse-grained actinolite, hornblende and biotite followed by pelites and semi-pelites that are intruded by separate sills. In the Ridge Lake area, the volcanic belt includes an interlayered series of amphibolite, gabbro, iron formation, sulfidic schist and metasediments.

Geochemical results of pillow lavas and chill boundaries along five transects across the volcanic belt suggest the existence of three chemically different magma types within the Bravo Lake Formation.

Lavas of the volcanic belt display geochemical characteristics similar to modern ocean-island–basalt groups. They range from moderately to intensely fractionated. REE-profiles are similar to those from tholeiitic basalts to extremely alkaline lavas in Hawaii.

== See also ==
- List of volcanoes in Canada
- Volcanism of Canada
- Volcanism of Northern Canada
- Geography of Nunavut
