= Blackwelder Mountains =

Mountain range in Nunavut, Canada

- Location within Nunavut

Highest point
- Coordinates: 80°39′07″N 84°24′56″W

Geography
- Country: Canada
- Region: Nunavut
- Parent range: Arctic Cordillera

The Blackwelder Mountains are a small mountain range on Ellesmere Island, Nunavut, Canada. It is a subrange of the Arctic Cordillera.

== See also ==
- List of mountain ranges
