= Scoresby Hills =

Mountain range

The Scoresby Hills, also called the Scoresby Mountains, (75°53′N 098°00′W) are a mountain range on the east coast of Bathurst Island, Nunavut, Canada. It consists of low hills which in turn form part of the Arctic Cordillera mountain system.

== See also ==
- List of mountain ranges
