= Mount Nukap =

Mountain in Nunavut, Canada

- Location within Nunavut

Highest point
- Elevation: 1,780 m (5,840 ft)
- Coordinates: 82°10′59″N 70°37′01″W

Geography
- Location: Baffin Island, Nunavut, Canada
- Parent range: Baffin Mountains

Mount Nukap is a mountain associated with the Baffin Mountains on Baffin Island, Nunavut, Canada.
