= Gull Glacier =

Glacier in Nunavut, Canada

Coordinates: 81°24′N 077°24′W

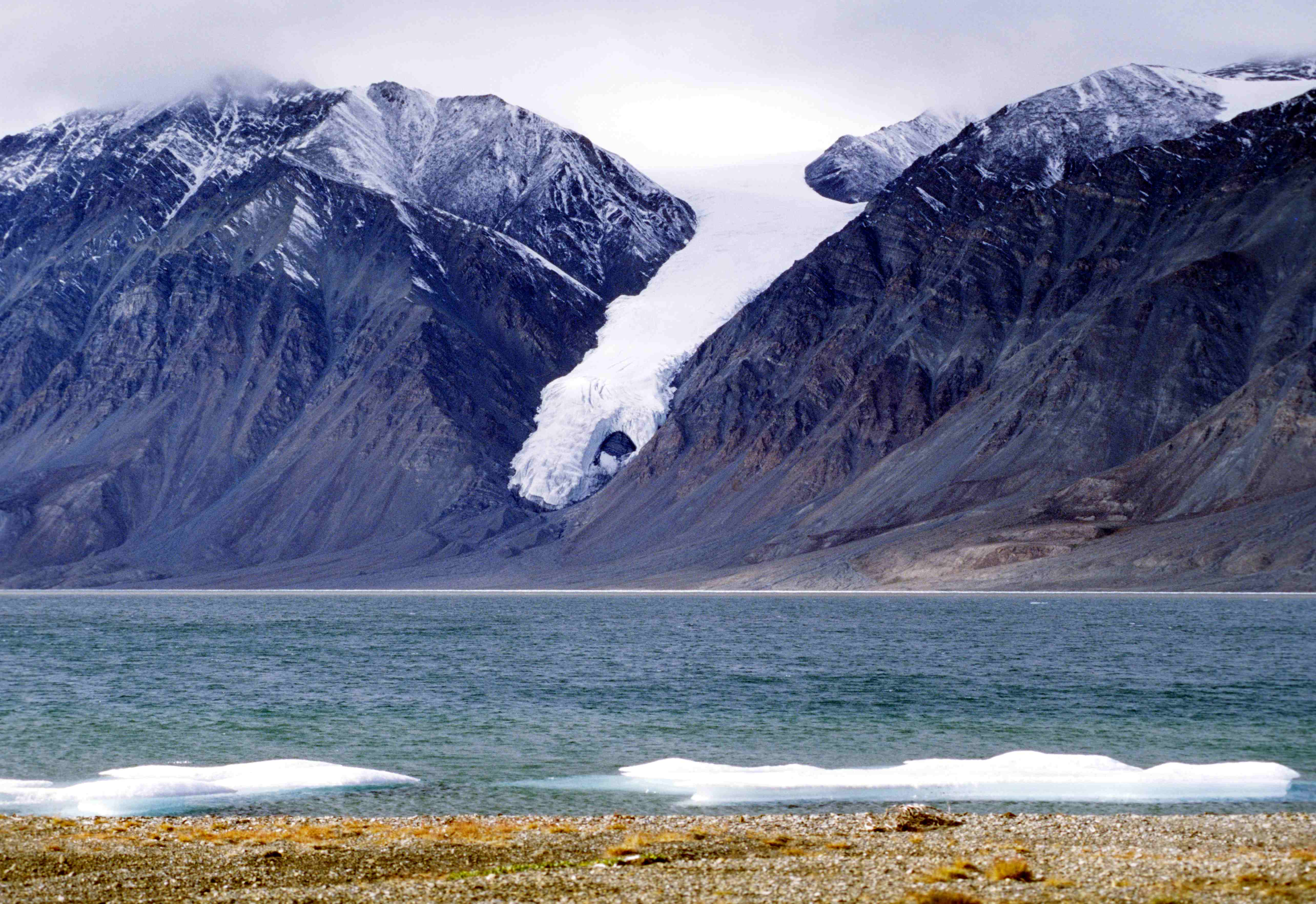
Gull Glacier in Tanquary Fiord

Gull Glacier is a glacier in the Osborn Range of north-central Ellesmere Island, Nunavut, Canada. It lies in the Tanquary Fiord in Quttinirpaaq National Park.
