= Princess Margaret Range =

Mountain range on Axel Heiberg Island in Nunavut, Canada

- Location within Nunavut

Highest point
- Peak: Outlook Peak
- Elevation: 2,210 m (7,250 ft)
- Coordinates: 79°45′N 91°23′W

Geography
- Country: Canada
- Territory: Nunavut
- Range coordinates: 79°41′N 90°30′W
- Parent range: Arctic Cordillera

The Princess Margaret Range, also called the Princess Margaret Mountains, is a mountain range on Axel Heiberg Island in Nunavut, Canada. The range is one of the most northern ranges in the world and of the Arctic Cordillera. The highest mountain in the range is Outlook Peak at 2,210 m (7,251 ft). The range has an area of 42,865 km^{2} (16,550 sq mi).

== See also ==
- List of mountain ranges
