= Outlook Peak =

Mountain in Nunavut, Canada

- Location within Nunavut

Highest point
- Elevation: 2,210 m (7,250 ft)
- Prominence: 2,210 m (7,250 ft)
- Listing: Highest ocean islands 58th; North America prominent peak 63rd; North America isolated peaks 73rd; Canada most prominent peak 25th; Canada most isolated peaks 22nd
- Coordinates: 79°44′24″N 91°24′00″W

Geography
- Location: Axel Heiberg Island, Nunavut, Canada
- Parent range: Princess Margaret Range
- Topo map: NTS 59H12 Pyramid Peak

Outlook Peak is a mountain in Qikiqtaaluk, Nunavut, Canada, located on the southwestern edge of the Muller Icecap. It is the highest mountain of the Princess Margaret Range at 2,210 m (7,251 ft), the highest on Axel Heiberg Island, and the fourth highest in Nunavut.

== See also ==
- List of summits of North American islands
- List of islands by highest point
- List of the most prominent summits of North America
