= Prince of Wales Mountains =

Group of mountains in Nunavut, Canada

- Location within Nunavut

Highest point
- Coordinates: 78°33′06″N 78°39′51″W

Geography
- Country: Canada
- Territory: Nunavut
- Parent range: Arctic Cordillera

The Prince of Wales Mountains are a mountain range running along the central-east coast of Ellesmere Island, Nunavut, Canada. The range is one of the most northern ranges in the world and of the Arctic Cordillera, which is a vast deeply dissected mountain range from Ellesmere Island to the northernmost tip of Labrador. The Prince of Wales Icefield lies mostly in the range.

== See also ==
- List of mountain ranges
