= Devon Island =

Uninhabited island in Nunavut, Canada

Native name: ᑕᓪᓗᕈᑎᑦ
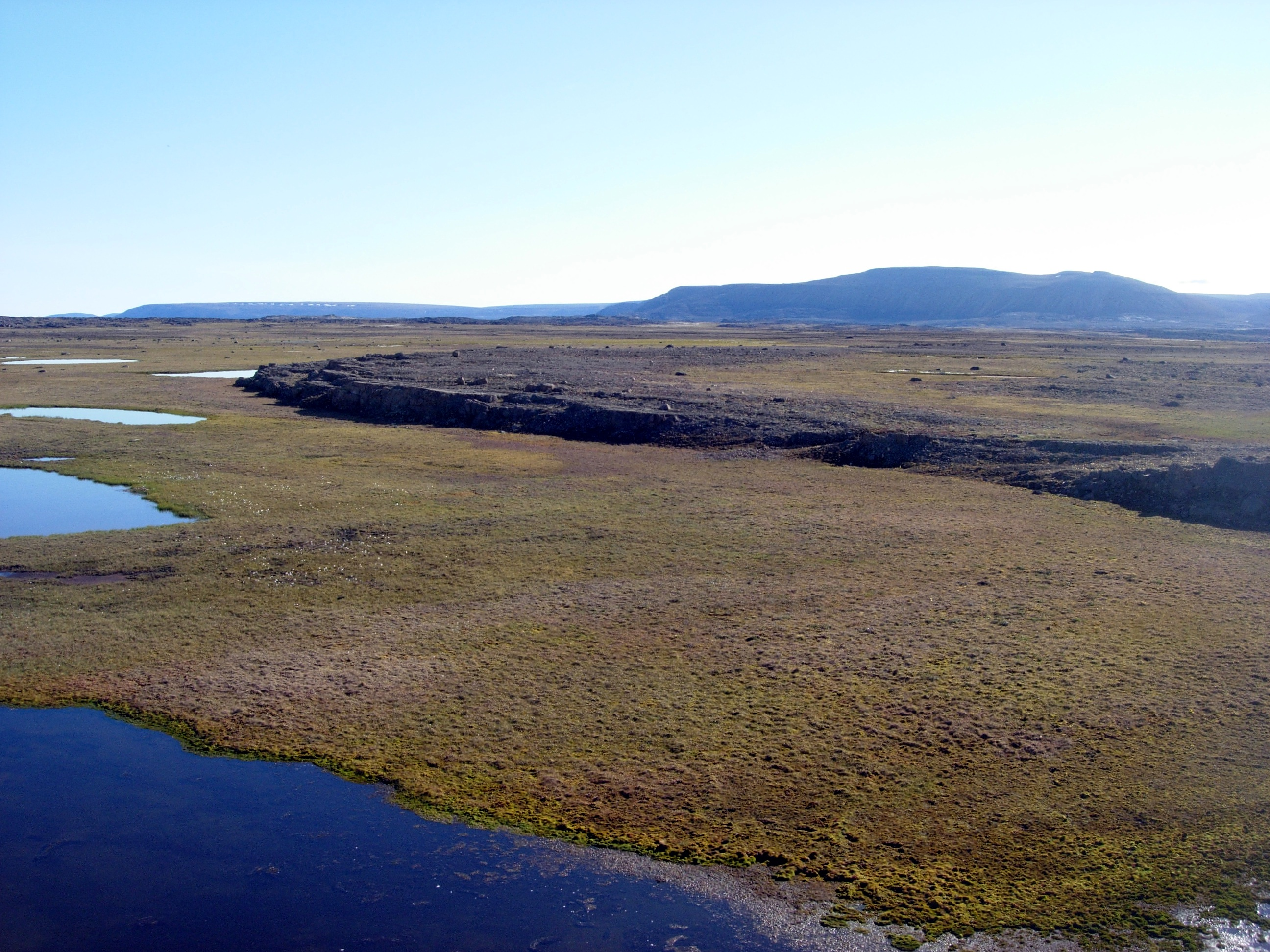
- Truelove Lowland, a polar oasis on Devon Island

- Location within Nunavut Location within Canada

Geography
- Location: Baffin Bay
- Coordinates: 75°15′N 088°00′W
- Archipelago: Queen Elizabeth Islands; Arctic Archipelago
- Area: 55,535.39 km^{2} (21,442.33 sq mi) (2026)
- Area rank: 6th in Canada & 27th worldwide
- Length: 524 km (325.6 mi)
- Width: 155–476 km (96–296 mi)
- Highest elevation: 1,920 m (6300 ft)
- Highest point: Devon Ice Cap

Administration
- Canada
- Territory: Nunavut
- Region: Qikiqtaaluk

Demographics
- Population: 0 (2024)

Devon Island (Note: Inuktitut: ᑕᓪᓗᕈᑎᑦ, Tallurutit) in Canada is the largest uninhabited island (no permanent human residents) in the world. It is in Baffin Bay, Qikiqtaaluk Region, Nunavut, Canada. It is one of the largest members of the Arctic Archipelago, the second-largest of the Queen Elizabeth Islands, Canada's sixth-largest island, and the 27th-largest island in the world. It has an area of 55,535.39 km^{2} (21,442.33 sq mi) (slightly smaller than Croatia). The bedrock is Precambrian gneiss and Paleozoic siltstones and shales. The highest point is the Devon Ice Cap at 1,920 m (6,300 ft) which is part of the Arctic Cordillera. Devon Island contains several small mountain ranges, such as the Treuter Mountains, Haddington Range, and Cunningham Mountains, as well as the Haughton impact crater. The notable similarity of its surface to that of Mars has attracted interest from scientists.

== History and settlement ==
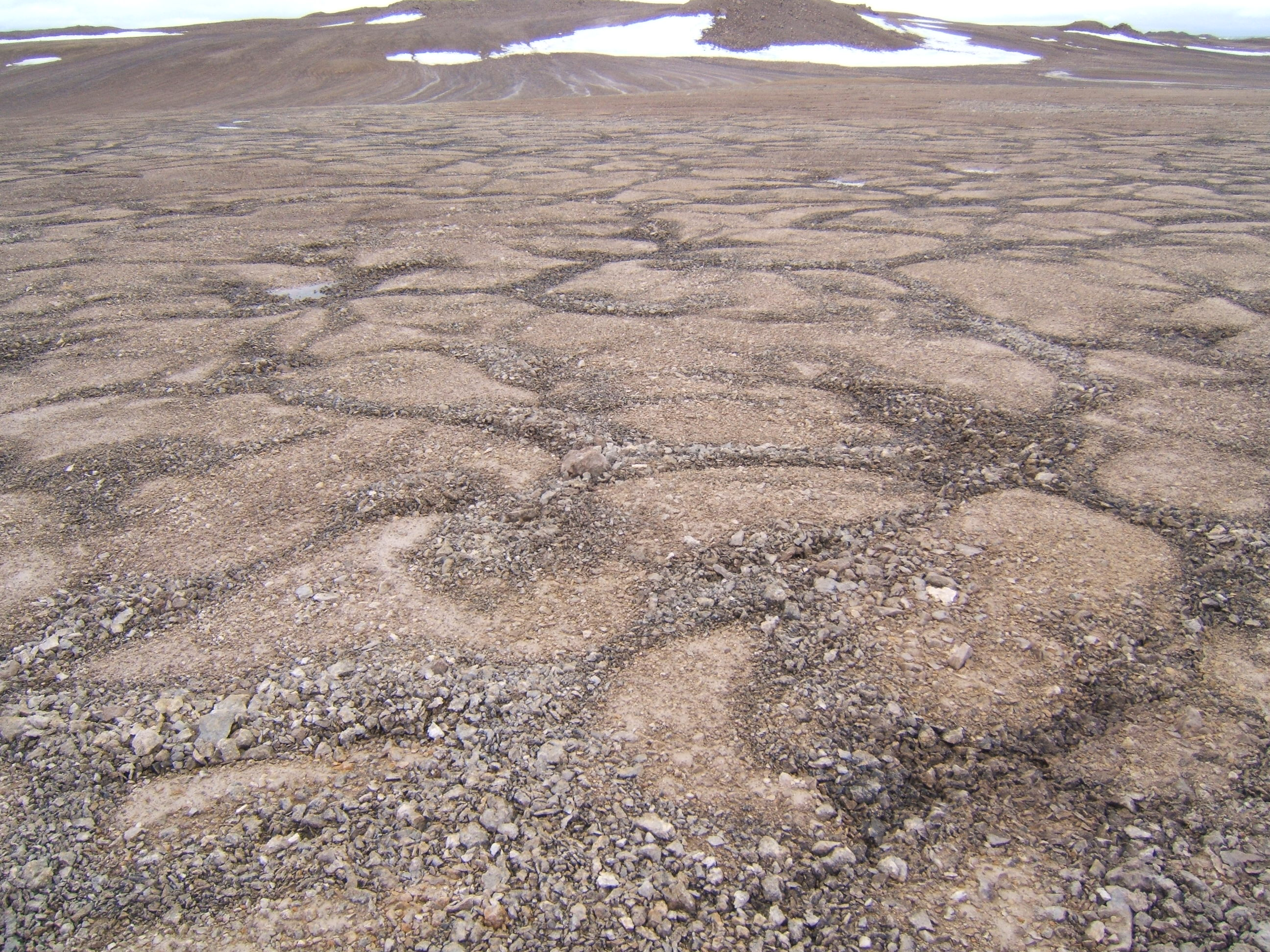
Patterned ground permafrost on Devon Island

Robert Bylot and William Baffin were the first Europeans to sight Devon Island in 1616. William Edward Parry charted its south coast in 1819–1820, and named it North Devon, after Devon in England, a name which was changed to Devon Island by the end of the 1800s. In 1850, Edwin De Haven sailed up Wellington Channel and sighted the Grinnell Peninsula. An outpost was established at Dundas Harbour in 1924, and it was leased to the Hudson's Bay Company nine years later. The collapse of fur prices led to the dispersal of 52 Baffin Island Inuit families to Dundas Harbour in 1934. Their time there was considered a disaster due to wind conditions and the much colder climate, and the Inuit chose to leave in 1936. Dundas Harbour was populated again in the late 1940s, but it was closed again in 1951. Only the ruins of a few buildings remain today.

== Geography ==
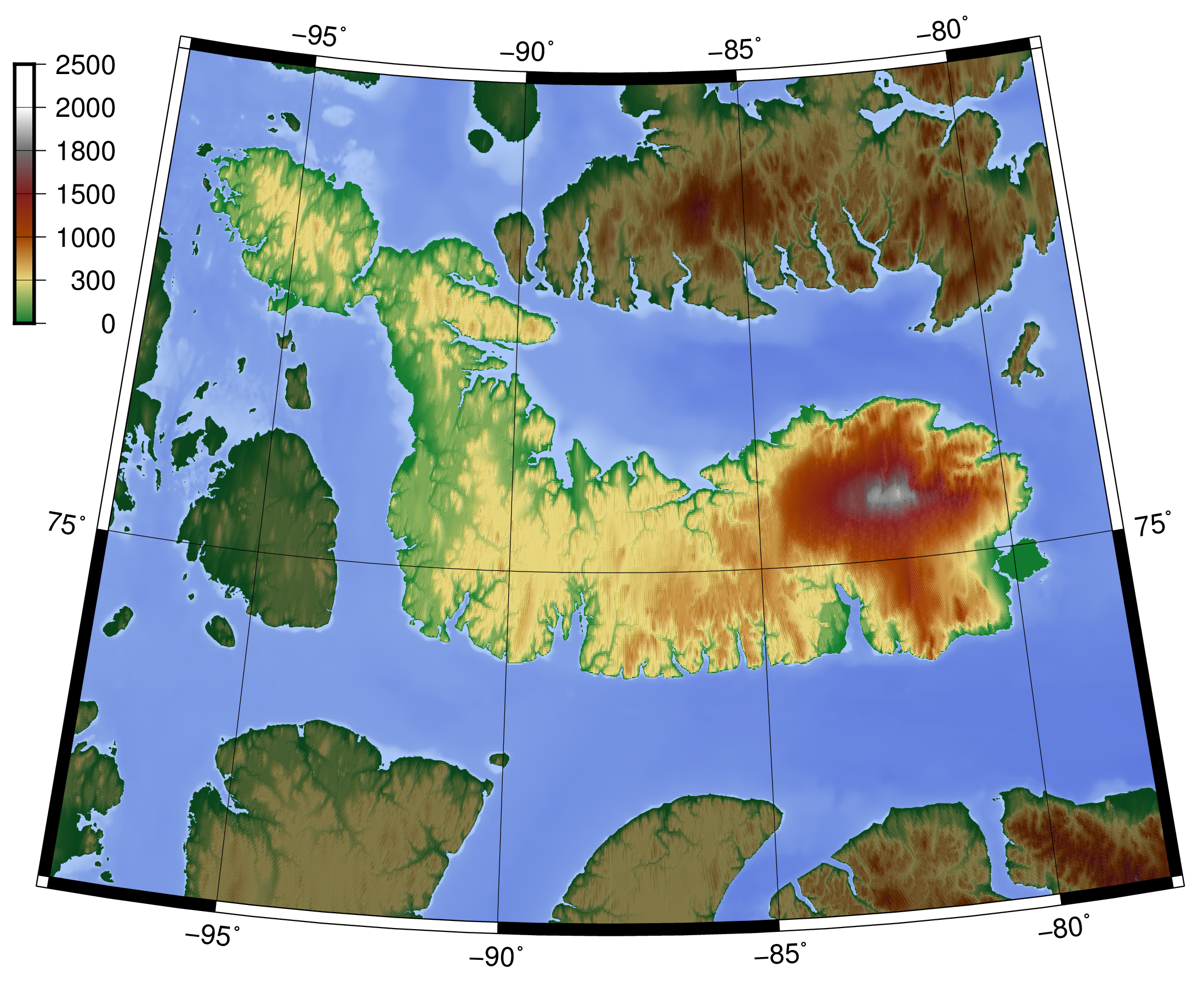
Topography of Devon Island

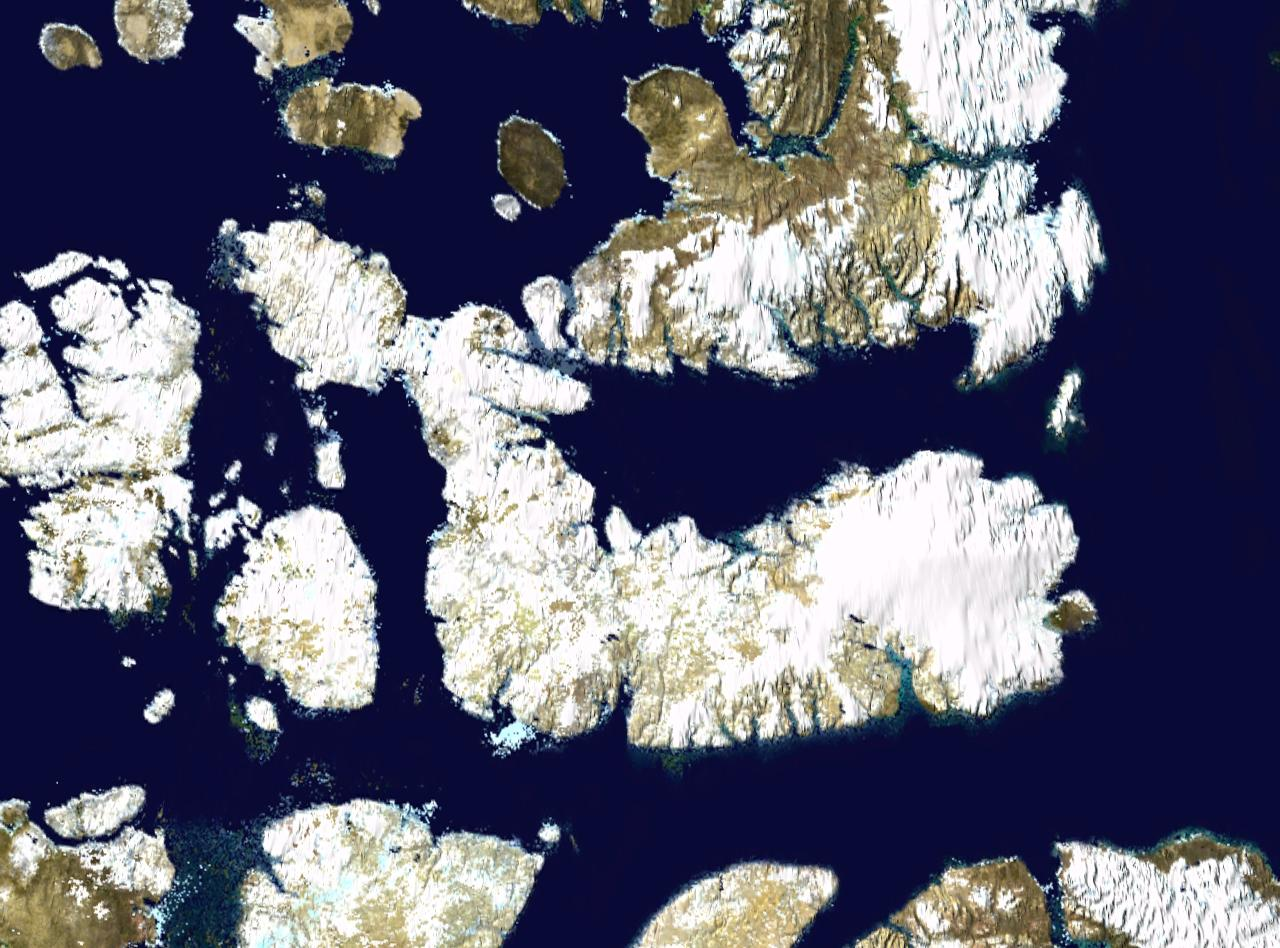
Satellite photo montage of Devon Island and its neighbours

Devon Island is between Ellesmere Island in the north, Cornwallis Island in the west, and Baffin Island in the south, separated from the latter by Lancaster Sound. Because of its relatively high elevation and its extreme northern latitude, Devon Island supports only a meagre population of muskoxen and small birds and mammals; the island does support hypolith communities. Animal life is concentrated in the Truelove Lowland area of the island, which has a favourable microclimate and supports relatively lush Arctic vegetation. Temperatures during the brief (40 to 55 days) growing season seldom exceed 10 °C (50 °F), and in winter can plunge to as low as −50 °C (−58 °F). With a polar desert ecology, Devon Island receives very little precipitation. Cape Liddon is an important bird area (IBA) notable for its black guillemot and northern fulmar populations. Cape Vera, another IBA site, is also noted for its northern fulmar population. Devon Island is also notable for the presence of the Haughton impact crater, created some 39 million years ago when a meteorite about 2 km (1.2 mi) in diameter crashed into what were then forests. The impact left a crater about 23 km (14 mi) in diameter, which was a lake for several million years. A number of fossils have been recovered from Haughton crater lake deposits, including the seal ancestor Puijila darwini and the rhinoceros Epiaceratherium.

== Scientific research ==
=== Devon Island Research Station ===
The Devon Island Research Station was established in 1960 and it is maintained by the Arctic Institute of North America. It is in the Truelove Lowland, on the northeast coast of Devon Island (75°40′N 84°35′W).

=== Flashline Mars ===
The Flashline Mars Arctic Research Station project entered its third season in 2004. In July 2004, Devon Island became the temporary home for five scientists and two journalists, who were to use the Mars-like environment to simulate living and working on that planet. April 2007 through 21 August 2007 was the longest simulation period and included 20 scientific studies. Earth and Mars science research continues, with three crews and two simulated Mars missions planned for the summer of 2025. The Haughton crater is now considered one of the world's best Mars analog sites. It is the summer home to NASA's complementary scientific program, the Haughton–Mars Project. The island's freezing temperatures, isolation, and remoteness offer scientists matchless research opportunities. Devon Island's harsh climate and barren terrain endeared it to NASA as the Arctic day and night cycle and restricted communications capabilities offer challenges similar to those presented by long-duration space flights. HMP has conducted geological, hydrological, botanical, and microbiological studies in this harsh environment since 1997. HMP-2008 was the twelfth field season at Devon Island. On July 16, 2013, the Canadian Space Agency assigned Canadian astronaut Jeremy Hansen to a secondment with the Centre for Planetary Science and Exploration of the University of Western Ontario at Haughton Crater in preparation for a potential future crewed exploration of Mars, the Moon or the asteroids.

== Conspiracy theories ==
Devon Island has been the subject of allegations by various conspiracy theorists and flat earthers. It has been claimed online that NASA secretly placed Mars rovers there to fool the public into thinking space travel is feasible, or in more extreme views, that Mars is even a real place.
