= List of mountain ranges =

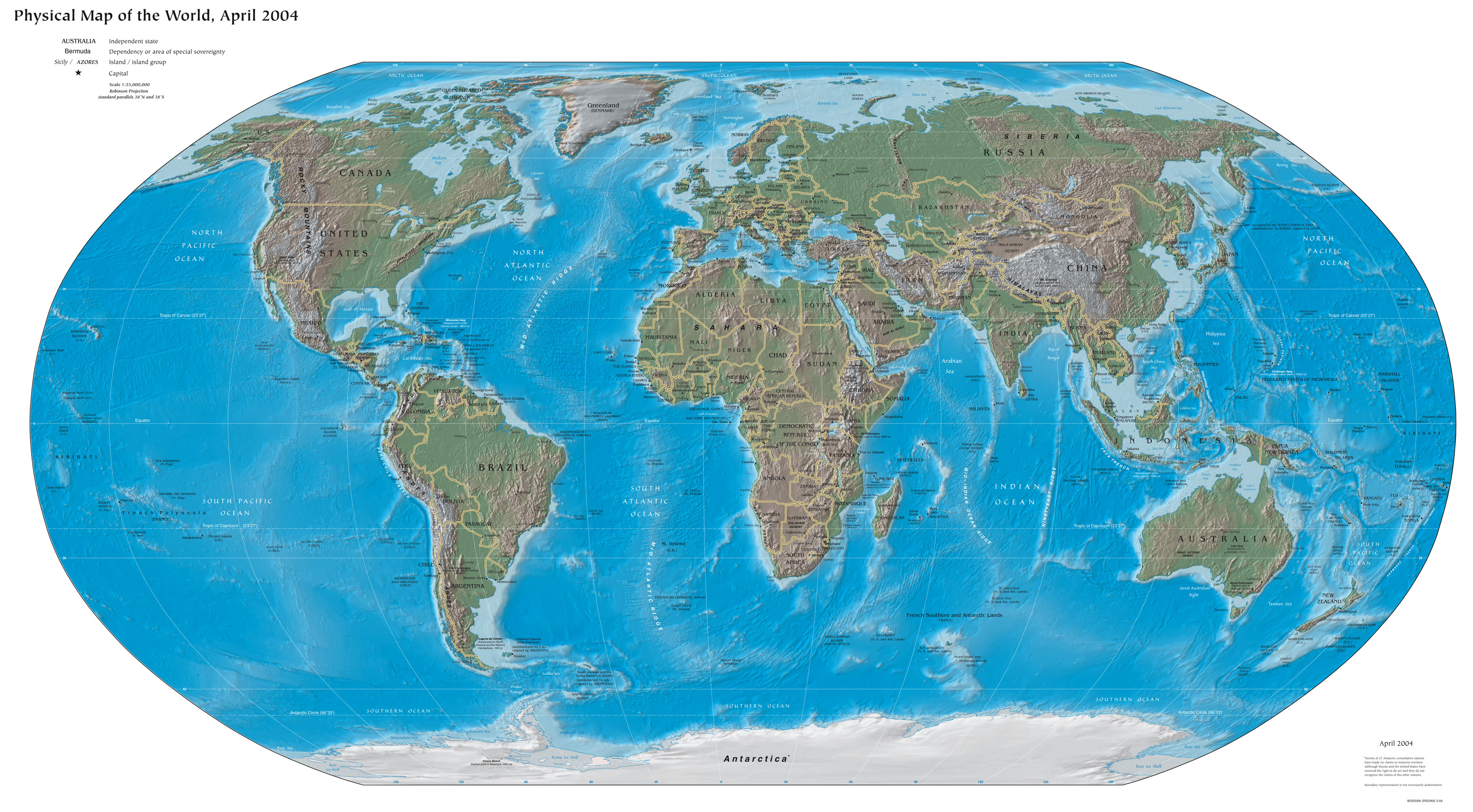
Physiographic world map with mountain ranges and highland areas in brown, pink, and gray

This is a list of mountain ranges on Earth and a few other astronomical bodies. First, the highest and longest mountain ranges on Earth are listed, followed by more comprehensive alphabetical lists organized by continent. Ranges in the oceans and on other celestial bodies are listed afterwards.

== Mountain ranges on Earth ==
=== By height ===
These are the 23 highest mountain ranges. All are above 5,000 metres (16,404 ft).

Name	Continent(s)	Country/ies	Highest Point	Highest Point's Altitude
Himalayas*	Asia	India, Nepal, Bhutan, China, Pakistan, Afghanistan	Everest	8,849 metres (29,032 ft)
Karakoram* (Note: The Ladakh Range is mostly considered to be part of the Karakoram.)	Asia	Pakistan, China, India, Tajikistan, Afghanistan	K2	8,611 metres (28,251 ft)
Hindu Kush*	Asia	Afghanistan, Pakistan, Tajikistan	Tirich Mir	7,708 metres (25,289 ft)
Pamirs**	Asia	Tajikistan, Kyrgyzstan, China, Afghanistan, Pakistan	Kongur Tagh (Note: A peak included in the "Eastern Pamirs" more often than in the Kunlun Mountains, as Kongur Tagh and the Kunlun range are separated by the large Yarkand River valley; no valley of such significance separates the Pamirs and Kongur Tagh, just political boundaries.)	7,649 metres (25,095 ft)
Hengduan Mountains*	Asia	China, Myanmar	Mount Gongga	7,556 metres (24,790 ft)
Tian Shan**	Asia	China, Kyrgyzstan, Kazakhstan, Uzbekistan, Tajikistan	Jengish Chokusu	7,439 metres (24,406 ft)
Kunlun**	Asia	China	Liushi Shan	7,167 metres (23,514 ft)
Transhimalaya* (Note: The Transhimalaya is composed of the Gangdise range to the west and the Nyenchen Tanglha range to the east.)	Asia	China	Mount Nyenchen Tanglha	7,162 metres (23,497 ft)
Andes	South America	Argentina, Chile, Peru, Bolivia, Ecuador, Colombia, Venezuela	Aconcagua	6,961 metres (22,838 ft)
Kangri Karpo*	Asia	China	Bairiga	6,882 metres (22,579 ft)
Hindu Raj*	Asia	Pakistan	Koyo Zom	6,873 metres (22,549 ft)
Tanggula Mountains**	Asia	China	Geladaindong Peak	6,621 metres (21,722 ft)
Altyn-Tagh**	Asia	China	Sulamutag Feng	6,245 metres (20,489 ft)
Alaska Range	North America	United States	Denali	6,194 metres (20,322 ft)
Saint Elias Mountains	North America	United States, Canada	Mount Logan	5,959 metres (19,551 ft)
Qilian Mountains**	Asia	China	Kangze Gyai	5,808 metres (19,055 ft)
Sierra Nevada de Santa Marta	South America	Colombia	Pico Cristóbal Colón	5,700 metres (18,701 ft)
Caucasus Mountains	Europe and Asia	Armenia, Georgia, Russia, Azerbaijan	Mount Elbrus	5,642 metres (18,510 ft)
Trans-Mexican Volcanic Belt	North America	Mexico	Pico de Orizaba	5,636 metres (18,491 ft)
Pamir-Alay**	Asia	Kyrgyzstan, Kazakhistan, Uzbekistan, Tajikistan	Pik Skalisty	5,621 metres (18,442 ft)
Alborz	Asia	Iran	Mount Damavand	5,610 metres (18,406 ft)
Armenian Highlands	Asia	Armenia, Turkey, Azerbaijan, Iran, Georgia	Mount Ararat	5,137 metres (16,854 ft)
Rwenzori Mountains	Africa	Uganda, Democratic Republic of the Congo	Mount Stanley	5,109 metres (16,762 ft)

* Part of the Hindu Kush-Himalayas region

** Part of the Pamir-Kunlun region

All of the Asian ranges above except the Alborz and the Armenian Highlands have been formed in part over the past 35 to 55 million years by the collision between the Indian Plate and Eurasian Plate. The Indian Plate is still particularly mobile and these mountain ranges continue to rise in elevation every year and this page may need to be updated in a few years; of these the Himalayas are rising most quickly; the Kashmir and Pamirs region to the north of the Indian subcontinent is the point of confluence of these mountains which encircle the Tibetan Plateau.

=== Mountain ranges by length ===
Mountain systems, Himalayan ranges and chains by length (over 500 km):

1. The underwater Mid-ocean ridge – 65,000 km (40,000 mi)
2. Ring of Fire – 40,000 km (25,000 mi)
  1. American Cordillera – 13,400 km (8,300 mi)
    1. Andes – 7,000 km (4,300 mi). Northern and Southern Andes main subdivisions, along both run three vast, almost parallel chain systems of mountain ranges – Cordillera Occidental, Cordillera Central and Cordillera Oriental.
    2. North American Cordillera – 6,400 km (4,000 mi)
3. Alpine-Himalayan orogenic belt – more than 15,000 km (9,300 mi)
  1. Hindu Kush-Himalayas region – 3,500 km (2,200 mi)
4. Great Escarpment, Southern Africa – 5,000 km (3,100 mi)
  1. Drakensberg – 1,000 km (620 mi)
5. Rocky Mountains – 4,830 km (3,000 mi) (section of the North American Cordillera)
6. Great Dividing Range – 3,500 km (2,200 mi)
7. Transantarctic Mountains – 3,500 km (2,200 mi)
8. Kunlun Mountains – 3,000 km (1,900 mi) (section of the Alpine-Himalayan orogenic belt)
9. Atlas Mountains – 2,500 km (1,600 mi) (section of the Alpine-Himalayan orogenic belt)
10. Ural Mountains – 2,500 km (1,600 mi)
11. Appalachian Mountains – 2,414 km (1,500 mi)
12. Himalayas – c.2,500 km (1,600 mi) (main section of the Hindu Kush-Himalayas region)
  1. High Himalayas – 2,300 km (1,400 mi)
  2. Sivalik Hills – 2,400 km (1,500 mi)
  3. Lesser Himalayas – 2,500 km (1,600 mi)
13. Altai mountain system – 2,000 km (1,243 mi)
14. New Guinea Highlands – 1,950 km (1,210 mi)
15. Barisan Mountains – c. 1,700 km (1,100 mi) (section of the Alpine-Himalayan orogenic belt)
16. Carpathian Mountains – 1,700 km (1,100 mi) (section of the Alpine-Himalayan orogenic belt)
17. Scandinavian Mountains (Scandes) – c. 1,700 km (1,100 mi)
18. Verkhoyansk Range-Suntar-Khayata Range – 1,650 km (1,030 mi) (section of the East Siberian System of mountains)
  1. Verkhoyansk Range – 1,100 km (680 mi)
  2. Suntar-Khayata Range – 550 km (340 mi)
19. Coast Mountains – 1,600 km (990 mi) (section of the North American Cordillera)
20. Qin Mountains – 1,600 km (990 mi)
21. Transhimalaya – 1,600 km (990 mi) (section of the Alpine-Himalayan orogenic belt)
22. Western Ghats – 1,600 km (990 mi)
23. Chersky Range – 1,500 km (930 mi) (section of the East Siberian System of mountains)
24. Peninsular mountain ranges – 1,500 km (930 mi) (section of the North American Cordillera)
25. Serra do Mar – 1,500 km (930 mi)
26. Taurus Mountains – 1,500 km (930 mi) (section of the Alpine-Himalayan orogenic belt)
27. Zagros Mountains – 1,500 km (930 mi) (section of the Alpine-Himalayan orogenic belt)
28. Sierra Madre Occidental – 1,500 km (930 mi) (section of the North American Cordillera)
29. Mantiqueira Mountains/Espinhaço Mountains – 1,320 km (820 mi)
30. Kolyma Mountains – 1,300 km (810 mi) (section of the East Siberian System of mountains)
31. Alps – 1,200 km (750 mi) (section of the Alpine-Himalayan orogenic belt)
  1. Western Alps – approx. 600 km (370 mi)
    1. French Prealps – more than 400 km (250 mi)
  2. Eastern Alps – approx. 600 km (370 mi)
    1. Central Eastern Alps – approx. 600 km (370 mi)
    2. Northern Limestone Alps – approx. 600 km (370 mi)
    3. Southern Limestone Alps and Western Limestone Alps – approx. 600 km (370 mi)
32. Apennines – 1,200 km (750 mi) (section of the Alpine-Himalayan orogenic belt)
33. Caucasus Mountains – 1,200 km (750 mi) (section of the Alpine-Himalayan orogenic belt)
  1. Greater Caucasus – 1,200 km (750 mi)
  2. Lesser Caucasus – 600 km (370 mi)
34. Cordillera Occidental (Colombia) – 1,200 km (750 mi) (section of the Northern Andes, American Cordillera)
35. Cordillera Oriental (Colombia) – 1,200 km (750 mi) (section of the Northern Andes, American Cordillera)
36. Vindhya Range – 1,200 km (750 mi)
37. Altai Mountains – 1,200 km (750 mi)
38. Drakensberg – 1,125 km (700 mi)
39. Byrranga Mountains – 1,100 kilometres (680 mi)
40. Cascade Range – 1,100 km (680 mi)
41. Annamite Range – 1,100 km (680 mi)
42. Brooks Range – 1,100 km (680 mi) (section of the North American Cordillera)
43. Verkhoyansk Range – 1,100 kilometres (680 mi) (section of the East Siberian Mountains)
44. Cordillera Central (Colombia) – 1,023 km (636 mi) (section of the Northern Andes, American Cordillera)
45. Lena Plateau – 1,000 km (620 mi) (section of the East Siberian System of mountains)
46. Pontic Mountains – 1,000 km (620 mi) (section of the Alpine-Himalayan orogenic belt)
47. Eastern Sayan Mountains – 1,000 km (620 mi)
48. Sierra Madre del Sur – 1,000 km (620 mi) (section of the North American Cordillera)
49. Arakan/Rakhine Mountains – 950 km (590 mi)
50. Hengduan Mountains – 900 km (560 mi) as a system of mountain ranges
51. Ogo Mountains – 900 km (560 mi)
52. Koryak Mountains – 880 km (550 mi) (Siberia)
53. Cape Fold Belt – 850 km (530 mi)
54. Hindu Kush – 800 km (500 mi) (section of the Hindu Kush-Greater Himalayas region)
55. Precordillera – 800 km (500 mi) (considered section of the Southern Andes, American Cordillera)
56. Dzhugdzhur Mountains – 700 km (430 mi)
57. Stanovoy Highlands – 700 km (430 mi) (section of the East Siberian System of mountains)
58. Aravalli Range – 692 km (430 mi)
59. Alaska Range – 650 km (400 mi) (section of the North American Cordillera)
60. Kopet Mountains – 650 km (400 mi) (section of the Alpine-Himalayan orogenic belt)
61. Sette-Daban – 660 km (410 mi) (section of the East Siberian System of mountains)
62. Dinaric Mountains – 645 km (401 mi) (section of the Alpine-Himalayan orogenic belt)
63. Sierra Nevada (U.S.) – 640 km (400 mi) (section of the North American Cordillera)
64. California Coast Ranges – 640 km (400 mi) (section of the North American Cordillera)
65. Balkan Mountains – 557 km (346 mi) (section of the Alpine-Himalayan orogenic belt)
66. Karakoram – 500 km (310 mi) (section of the Hindu Kush-Greater Himalayas region)
67. Southern Alps – 500 km (310 mi)
68. Yudoma-Maya Highlands – 500 km (310 mi) (section of the East Siberian System of mountains)

=== By continents ===
==== Africa ====
1. Aberdare ranges, Kenya
2. Ahaggar Mountains, Algeria
3. Ahmar Mountains, Ethiopia
4. Amaro Mountains, Ethiopia
5. Atlantika Mountains, Cameroon, Nigeria
6. Atlas Mountains, Algeria, Morocco, Tunisia
  1. Anti-Atlas, Morocco
  2. Aurès Mountains, Algeria, Tunisia
  3. High Atlas, Morocco
  4. Middle Atlas, Morocco
  5. Saharan Atlas, Algeria
  6. Tell Atlas, Algeria, Morocco, Tunisia
7. Bale Mountains, Ethiopia
8. Bakossi Mountains, Cameroon
9. Blue Mountains, Niger
10. Bvumba Mountains, Mozambique, Zimbabwe
11. Cal Madow, Somalia
12. Cederberg, South Africa
13. Danakil Alps, Ethiopia, Eritrea
14. Drakensberg, Lesotho, South Africa
15. Eastern Arc Mountains, Kenya, Tanzania
16. Eastern Highlands, Mozambique, Zimbabwe
17. Entoto Mountains, Ethiopia
18. Erta Ale Range, Ethiopia
19. Golis Mountains, Somalia
20. Khufleh Range, Somalia
21. Kilimanjaro and Meru, Tanzania
22. Kipengere Range, Tanzania
23. Lebombo Mountains, Mozambique
24. Magaliesberg, South Africa
25. Mahale Mountains, Tanzania
26. Mandara Mountains, Cameroon, Nigeria
27. Moka Range, Mauritius
28. Ogo Mountains, Somalia
29. Outeniqua, South Africa
30. Pare Mountains, Tanzania
31. Piton des Neiges – Piton de la Fournaise, Réunion
32. Rif, Morocco
33. Rwenzori, Uganda
34. Semien, Ethiopia
35. Swartberg, South Africa
36. Tadrat Acacus, Libya
37. Tibesti Mountains, Chad
38. Udzungwa Mountains, Tanzania
39. Uluguru Mountains, Tanzania
40. Usambara Mountains, Tanzania

==== Antarctica ====
1. Allardyce Range, South Georgia
2. Imeon Range, Smith Island
3. Pensacola Mountains
4. Salvesen Range, South Georgia
5. Tangra Mountains, Livingston Island
6. Transantarctic Mountains
  1. Queen Maud Mountains
    1. Bush Mountains
    2. Commonwealth Range
    3. Dominion Range
    4. Gothic Mountains
    5. Green Range
    6. Herbert Range
    7. Prince Olav Mountains
    8. Hughes Range
    9. Supporters Range
  2. Theron Mountains
7. Heimefront Range, Queen Maud Land
8. Borg Massif, Queen Maud Land
9. Fimbulheimen, Queen Maud Land
  1. Gburek Peaks
  2. Sverdrup Mountains
  3. Gjelsvik Mountains
  4. Mühlig-Hofmann Mountains
  5. Orvin Mountains
    1. Filchner Mountains
    2. Drygalski Mountains
    3. Kurze Mountains
    4. Gagarin Mountains
    5. Conrad Mountains
  6. Wohlthat Mountains
    1. Humboldt Mountains
    2. Petermann Ranges
    3. Gruber Mountains
  7. Hoel Mountains
    1. Weyprecht Mountains
    2. Payer Mountains
  8. Lomonosov Mountains
10. Sør Rondane Mountains, Queen Maud Land
11. Belgica Mountains, Queen Maud Land
12. Planet Heights
13. Queen Fabiola Mountains, Queen Maud Land
14. Aristotle Mountains, Graham Land
  1. Pippin Peaks
15. Stribog Mountains, Brabant Island
16. Solvay Mountains, Brabant Island
17. Brugmann Mountains, Liège Island
18. Executive Committee Range

==== Asia ====
1. Alagalla Mountain Range, Sri Lanka
2. Alborz, Iran
3. Al-Hajar Mountains, Oman, United Arab Emirates
4. Altai Mountains, Russia, China, Mongolia, Kazakhstan
5. Annamite Range, Laos, Vietnam
6. Anti-Lebanon, Lebanon, Syria, Israel
7. Aravalli Range, India
8. Asir Mountains, Saudi Arabia
9. Barisan Mountains, Indonesia
10. Caraballo Mountains, Philippines
11. Cardamom Mountains, Cambodia
12. Carmel Mountains, Israel
13. Caucasus, Russia, Georgia, Azerbaijan, Armenia, Turkey
14. Chersky Range, Russia
15. Chittagong Hill Tracts, Bangladesh
16. Cordillera Central, Philippines
17. Crocker Range, Malaysia
18. Dieng Volcanic Complex, Indonesia
19. Dzhugdzhur Mountains, Russia
20. Eastern Ghats, India
21. Fansipan, Vietnam
22. Haraz Mountains, Yemen
23. Hijaz Mountains
24. Himalaya, Nepal, Bhutan, China, India, Pakistan
  1. Mahabharat Range or Lesser Himalaya
  2. Siwalik Range or Churia Hills, Subhimalaya
25. Hindu Kush, Afghanistan, Pakistan
26. Japanese Alps, Japan
  1. Akaishi Mountains
  2. Hida Mountains
  3. Kiso Mountains
27. Judaean Mountains, Palestine, Israel
28. Kabir Kuh, Iran, Iraq
29. Karakoram, Pakistan, China, India
30. Khingan Mountains, China, Russia
  1. Greater Khingan
  2. Lesser Khingan
31. Khibinsky Mountains, Russia
32. Kirthar Mountains, Pakistan
33. Knuckles Mountain Range, Sri Lanka
34. Kolyma Mountains Russia
35. Koryak Mountains Russia
36. Kunlun Mountains, China (Tibet)
37. Kuray Mountains, Russia
38. Mount Lebanon Range, Lebanon
39. Müller Mountains, Central Borneo, Indonesia
40. Pamir Mountains, Tajikistan, Kyrgyzstan, Afghanistan, China
41. Pontic Mountains, Turkey
42. Phnom Kulen, Cambodia
43. Phnom Voar, Cambodia
44. Safed Koh, Afghanistan, Pakistan
45. Salt Range, Pakistan
46. Sayan Mountains, Russia
47. Sivalik Hills range of outer Himalayas, India
48. Sierra Madre, Philippines
49. Sikhote Alin Mountains, Russia
50. Stanovoi Range, Russia
51. Sudirman Range, Indonesia
52. Sulaiman Mountains, Pakistan, Iran
53. Ta Kream Mountain Range, Cambodia
54. Taurus Mountains, Turkey
55. Toba Kakar Range, Afghanistan, Pakistan
56. Tian Shan, China, Kazakhstan, Kyrgyzstan
57. Taiwan Mountains, Taiwan
58. Tengger Mountains, Indonesia
59. Titiwangsa Mountains, Malaysia
60. Ural Mountains, Russia
61. Verkhoyansk Range, Russia
62. Western Ghats, India
63. Zagros Mountains, Iran, Iraq
64. Zambales Mountains, Philippines
65. Zamboanga Cordilleras, Philippines

==== Europe ====
1. Alps
  1. Eastern Alps, Austria, Germany, Italy, Liechtenstein, Slovenia, Switzerland
    1. Central Eastern Alps, Austria, Italy, Slovenia, Switzerland
      1. Bergamo Alps, Italy
      2. Hohe Tauern, Austria, Italy
        1. Ankogel Group
        2. Defereggen Mountains
        3. Grossglockner
        4. Goldberg Group
        5. Granatspitz Group
        6. Hafner Group
        7. Kreuzeck Group
        8. Rieserferner Group
        9. Schober Group
        10. Venediger Group
      3. Kitzbühel Alps, Austria
      4. Niedere Tauern, Austria
      5. Ötztal Alps, Austria, Italy
      6. Rhaetian Alps, Austria, Italy, Switzerland
        1. Albula Range
        2. Bernina Range
        3. Bregaglia Range
        4. Livigno Range
        5. Oberhalbstein Range
        6. Plessur Range
        7. Samnaun Alps
        8. Sesvenna Range
        9. Silvretta
      7. Rätikon, Austria, Liechtenstein, Switzerland
      8. Stubai Alps, Austria, Italy
      9. Tux Alps, Austria
      10. Verwall Alps, Austria
      11. Zillertal Alps, Austria, Italy
    2. Northern Limestone Alps, Austria, Germany
      1. Allgäu Alps, Austria, Germany
      2. Berchtesgaden Alps, Austria, Germany
      3. Dachstein, Austria
      4. Ennstaler Alpen, Austria
      5. Karwendel, Austria, Germany
      6. Lechtal Alps, Austria
      7. Totes Gebirge, Austria
      8. Wetterstein, Austria, Germany
      9. Wilden Kaiser, Austria
    3. Southern Limestone Alps, Austria, Italy, Slovenia, Switzerland
      1. Adamello-Presanella, Italy
      2. Brenta Group, Italy
      3. Carnic Alps, Austria, Italy
      4. Dolomites, Italy
      5. Julian Alps, Italy, Slovenia
      6. Kamnik Alps, Austria, Slovenia
      7. Karawanken, Austria, Slovenia
      8. Ortler Alps, Italy, Switzerland
  2. Western Alps (France, Italy, and Switzerland)
    1. Bernese Alps, Switzerland
    2. Cottian Alps, France, Italy
    3. Glarus Alps, Switzerland
    4. Graian Alps, France, Italy, Switzerland
      1. Mont Blanc Group, France, Italy
      2. Beaufortain Massif, France
      3. Vanoise, France
      4. Gran Paradiso, France, Italy
    5. Lepontine Alps, Italy, Switzerland
    6. Ligurian Alps, France, Italy
    7. North-Eastern Swiss Alps, Switzerland
    8. Pennine Alps, Italy, Switzerland
    9. Dauphiné Alps, France
    10. Maritime Alps, France, Italy
    11. Prealps, France, Italy
      1. Provence Prealps, France
        1. Dentelles de Montmirail, France
      2. Savoy Prealps, France
    12. Savoie Alps, France Switzerland
    13. Urner Alps, Switzerland
2. Apennines, Italy, San Marino
3. Balkan Mountains range, mainly Bulgaria, smaller part in Serbia
  1. Central Balkan Mountains
    1. Kaloferska Mountain, Botev Peak, Central Balkan Mountains, Bulgaria
    2. Zlatishko-Tetevenska Mountain, Bulgaria
  2. Western Balkan Mountains
    1. Chiprovska Mountain
    2. Berkovska Mountain, Bulgaria
    3. Vrachanski Balkan, Bulgaria
4. Black Forest, Germany
5. Cantabrian Mountains, Spain
  1. Picos de Europa
  2. Basque Mountains
6. Carpathian Mountains, Czech Republic, Hungary, Poland, Romania, Serbia, Slovakia, Ukraine
  1. Western Carpathians
    1. Tatra Mountains, Poland, Slovakia
    2. Western Beskids and Central Beskids
  2. Eastern Carpathians
    1. Bieszczady Mountains
      1. Otryt
    2. Low Beskids
      - Bukowica Range
    3. Eastern Beskids
    4. Moldavian-Muntenian Carpathians
  3. Southern Carpathians
    1. Făgăraș Mountains group
    2. Retezat-Godeanu Mountains group
    3. Poiana Ruscă Mountains
    4. Banat Mountains
  4. Apuseni Mountains
    1. Bihor Mountains
7. Caucasus Mountains, Armenia, Azerbaijan, Georgia, Russia
  1. Bezengi Wall, Georgia
8. Ceraunian Mountains, Albania
9. Dinaric Alps, Albania, Bosnia and Herzegovina, Croatia, Kosovo, Montenegro, North Macedonia, Serbia, Slovenia
  1. Accursed Mountains
10. Gennargentu, Italy
11. Harz, Germany
12. Ireland mountains
  1. MacGillycuddy's Reeks, Ireland
  2. Wicklow Mountains, Ireland
  3. Mourne Mountains, Northern Ireland
  4. Sperrin Mountains, Northern Ireland
13. Jura Mountains, France, Switzerland
14. Karelides, Finland
15. Kyrenia Mountains, Cyprus
16. Lake District, England
17. Măcin Mountains, Romania
18. Massif Central, France
19. Olympus Range
  1. Mount Olympus
20. Owl Mountains
21. Ore Mountains, Czech Republic, Germany
22. Pennines, England
23. Pindus Mountains, mainly Greece, smaller parts in Albania
24. Pyrenees, Andorra, France, Spain
25. Rila-Rhodope mountain massif, mainly Bulgaria, North Macedonia, Greece
  1. Rila, Bulgaria
  2. Pirin, Bulgaria
  3. Slavyanka (mountain)
  4. Osogovo-Belasitsa mountain range
    1. Osogovo
    2. Belasitsa
    3. Vlahina
    4. Malashevska mountain
    5. Plačkovica
    6. Ogražden
  5. Rhodope Mountains, mainly Bulgaria, Greece
    1. Western Rhodopes
    2. Eastern Rhodopes
26. Rhön Mountains, Germany
27. Šar range, Albania, Kosovo, North Macedonia
  1. Šar Mountains
  2. Mount Korab
  3. Mount Bistra
  4. Stogovo
  5. Dešat
  6. Jablanica
  7. Galičica
28. Scandinavian Mountains, Finland, Norway, Sweden
  1. Setesdalsheiene
  2. Jotunheimen
  3. Rondane
  4. Dovrefjell
  5. Trollheimen
  6. Kjolen Mountains
  7. Saltfjellet
  8. Svecofennides
  9. Lyngen Alps
29. Scottish Highlands
  1. Grampian Mountains, Scotland
    1. Ben Nevis
  2. Cairngorms, Scotland
  3. The Cuillins, Isle of Skye
30. Sierra Morena, Spain
31. Sistema Bético, Spain
32. Sistema Central, Portugal, Spain
  1. Sierra de Guadarrama
33. Sistema Ibérico, Spain
34. Skanderbeg Range, Albania
35. Srednogorie mountain system, Bulgaria
  1. Vitosha, Bulgaria
  2. Sredna Gora, Bulgaria
36. Strandzha, Bulgaria, Turkey
37. Świętokrzyskie Mountains, Poland
38. Sudetes, Czech Republic, Germany, Poland
  1. Ślęża Masiff
  2. Lusatian Mountains
  3. Ještěd–Kozákov Ridge
  4. Jizera Mountains
  5. Kaczawskie Mountains
  6. Giant Mountains
  7. Rudawy Janowickie
  8. Wałbrzyskie Mountains
  9. Stone Mountains
  10. Owl Mountains
  11. Bardzkie Mountains
  12. Stołowe Mountains
  13. Orlicke Mountains
  14. Bystrzyckie Mountains
  15. Golden Mountains
  16. Snieżnik Mountains
  17. Opawskie Mountains
  18. Hrubý Jeseník
  19. Nízký Jeseník
39. Bohemian Forest, Austria, Czech Republic, Germany
40. Swabian Alb, Germany
41. Serra de Tramuntana, Spain
42. Troodos Mountains, Cyprus
43. Ural Mountains, Russia
44. Vogelsberg Mountains, Germany
45. Vosges mountains, France
46. Wales mountains
  1. Black Mountains
  2. Brecon Beacons
  3. Cambrian Mountains
  4. Preseli Mountains
  5. Snowdonia
47. West Vardar/Pelagonia mountain range, North Macedonia, Greece
  1. Baba Mountain
  2. Jakupica
  3. Nidže
  4. Kožuf

==== North America ====
===== Middle America =====
====== Caribbean ======
1. Blue Mountains, Jamaica
2. Central Range, Trinidad and Tobago
3. Chaîne de la Selle, Haiti
4. Cordillera Central, Dominican Republic
5. Cordillera Septentrional, Dominican Republic
6. Cordillera Central, Puerto Rico
7. Dry Harbour Mountains, Jamaica
8. John Crow Mountains, Jamaica
9. Massif de la Hotte, Haiti
10. Massif du Nord, Haiti
11. Mocho Mountains, Jamaica
12. Montagnes Noires, Haiti
13. Northern Range, Trinidad and Tobago
14. Sierra de Baoruco, Dominican Republic
15. Sierra de Cayey, Puerto Rico
16. Sierra de Luquillo, Puerto Rico
17. Sierra del Escambray, Cuba
18. Sierra Maestra, Cuba
19. Sierra del Rosario, Cuba

====== Central America ======
1. Cerros de Escazú, Costa Rica
2. Cordillera de Guanacaste, Costa Rica
3. Cordillera de Talamanca, Costa Rica and Panamá
4. Cordillera de Tilarán, Costa Rica
5. Cordillera Isabelia, Nicaragua, Honduras
6. Cordillera Los Maribios, Nicaragua
7. Cordillera Central, Costa Rica
8. Maya Mountains, Belize
9. Sierra de Chinajá, Guatemala
10. Sierra de Chuacús, Guatemala
11. Sierra de los Cuchumatanes, Guatemala
12. Sierra del Merendón, Guatemala and Honduras
13. Sierra Madre de Chiapas, México, Guatemala, Honduras, and El Salvador

====== Mexico ======
1. Chiapas Highlands, Mexico
2. Peninsular Ranges, California and México
  1. Sierra de Juarez, México
  2. Sierra de la Giganta, México
  3. Sierra de la Laguna, México
  4. Sierra de San Borja, México
  5. Sierra de San Francisco, México
  6. Sierra San Pedro Martir, Baja California, México
3. Sierra Madre de Chiapas, México, Guatemala, Honduras, and El Salvador
4. Sierra Madre del Sur, México
5. Sierra Madre Occidental, México
  1. Sierra Fría, Mexico
  2. Sierra los Huicholes, México
  3. Sierra de Morones, Mexico
  4. Sierra Tarahumara, México
6. Sierra Madre Oriental, México
  1. Sierra del Burro, México
  2. Sierra del Carmen, México
7. Sierra Norte de Puebla, México
8. Sierra de Tamaulipas, Mexico
9. Trans-Mexican Volcanic Belt (Sierra Nevada), México
10. Tuxtla Mountains, México

===== Northern America =====
====== Canada ======
1. Adam Range
2. Adamant Range
3. Alsek Ranges, British Columbia, Alaska, Yukon
4. Anvil Range, Yukon
5. Appalachian Mountains, eastern Canada
  1. List of subranges of the Appalachian Mountains
6. Arctic Cordillera, northeastern Canada
  1. Geodetic Hills
7. Asulkan Range
8. Badshot Range
9. Baffin Mountains
10. Battle Range
11. Beaufort Range
12. Big Bend Ranges, British Columbia
13. Big Salmon Range, Yukon
14. Blackwelder Mountains
15. Blue Mountains
16. Bonanza Range
17. Bonnet Plume Range, Yukon
18. Bonnington Range
19. Britannia Range
20. British Empire Range
21. British Mountains, Yukon
22. Bruce Mountains
23. Byam Martin Mountains
24. Cadwallader Range
25. Camelsfoot Range
26. Cameron Range
27. Canadian Rockies
28. Cantilever Range
29. Cariboo Mountains
30. Cascade Range
31. Cayoosh Range
32. Challenger Mountains
33. Chilcotin Ranges
34. Clachnacudainn Range
35. Clendinning Range
36. Cloister Mountains
37. Coast Mountains, Alaska, Yukon, British Columbia
38. Columbia Mountains, Canada and U.S.
39. Conger Range
40. Coquitlam Range
41. Crease Range
42. Cunningham Mountains
43. Dawson Range
44. Dickson Range
45. Douglas Ranges
46. Douro Range
47. Duncan Ranges
48. Elk River Mountains
49. Everett Mountains
50. Fannin Range
51. Franklin Range
52. Garfield Range
53. Garibaldi Ranges
54. Genevieve Range
55. Glenyon Range, Yukon
56. Goat Range
57. Gowlland Range
58. Grinnell Range
59. Grogan Morgan Range
60. Haddington Range
61. Haihte Range
62. Ha-Iltzuk Icefield
63. Halifax Range
64. Hankin Range
65. Hartz Mountains (Nunavut)
66. Hermit Range
67. Hess Mountains, Yukon
68. Homathko Icefield
69. Ilgachuz Range
70. Inglefield Mountains
71. Innuitian Mountains
72. Insular Mountains, British Columbia
73. Itcha Range
74. Jeffries Range
75. Joy Range
76. Karmutzen Range
77. Kaumajet Mountains, Labrador, Canada
78. Kettle River Range, Washington and British Columbia
79. Kiglapait Mountains, Labrador
80. Kitimat Ranges
81. Kluane Ranges, Yukon
82. Knorr Range, Yukon
83. Kokanee Range
84. Kootenay Ranges, British Columbia
  1. Vermilion Range
  2. Stanford Range
  3. Beaverfoot Range
85. Krag Mountains
86. Krieger Mountains
87. Lardeau Range
88. Level Mountain Range
89. Lillooet Icecap
90. Lillooet Ranges
91. Long Range Mountains, Newfoundland
92. MacDonald Range, British Columbia
93. McKay Range
94. Monashee Mountains, British Columbia and Washington
95. Nadaleen Range, Yukon
96. Nelson Range
97. Newcastle Range
98. Niut Range
99. Norns Range
100. North Shore Mountains
101. Ogilvie Mountains
102. Osborn Range
103. Pelham Range
104. Pelly Mountains, Yukon
105. Pierce Range
106. Precipitous Mountains
107. Premier Range
108. Prince of Wales Mountains
109. Prince of Wales Range
110. Princess Margaret Range
111. Purity Range
112. Queen Charlotte Mountains, British Columbia
113. Quesnel Highland
114. Rainbow Range
115. Refugium Range
116. Richardson Mountains, Yukon
117. Rocky Mountains, western United States and Canada
118. Rocky Mountain Foothills, British Columbia and Alberta
119. Ruby Range
120. Saint Elias Mountains, southern Alaska, Yukon and British Columbia
121. San Christoval Range
122. Sawtooth Range (Nunavut)
123. Scoresby Hills
124. Selamiut Range
125. Selkirk Mountains, British Columbia, Idaho and Washington
126. Selwyn Mountains, Yukon
127. Seymour Range
128. Shulaps Range
129. Shuswap Highland
130. Sir Donald Range
131. Sir Sandford Range
132. Somerset Range
133. Sophia Range
134. Spearhead Range
135. Spectrum Range
136. St. Cyr Range, Yukon
137. Stokes Range
138. Sutton Range
139. Sweet Grass Hills, Alberta-Montana
140. Swiss Range
141. Tantalus Range
142. Thorndike Peaks
143. Tochquonyalla Range
144. Torngat Mountains, Labrador, Quebec
145. Treuter Mountains
146. United States Range
147. Valhalla Ranges
148. Valkyr Range
149. Vancouver Island Ranges, British Columbia
150. Victoria and Albert Mountains
151. Waddington Range
152. Wernecke Mountains, Yukon
153. Windy Range
154. Winston Churchill Range, Alberta

====== Greenland ======
1. Alángup Qáqai
2. Alexandrine Range
3. Amitsorssûp Qulâ
4. Barth Range
5. Brages Range
6. Crown Prince Frederick Range
7. Daly Range
8. Didrik Pining Range
9. Ejnar Mikkelsen Range
10. Ellemands Range
11. Fynske Alps
12. Giesecke Range
13. Graah Mountains
14. Gronau Nunataks
15. Grønne Range
16. H. H. Benedict Range
17. Halle Range
18. Haug Range
19. Heywood Range
20. Hjelm Range
21. Kangerluluk Range
22. Knud Rasmussen Range
23. Lacroix Range
24. Lemon Range
25. Lilloise Range
26. Lindbergh Range
27. Mols Range
28. Murchison Range
29. Musk Ox Mountains
30. Norlund Alps
31. Pentamerus Range
32. Pictet Range
33. Prince of Wales Range
34. Princess Caroline Mathilde Alps
35. Princess Elizabeth Alps
36. Qârusuit Range
37. Qivssakatdlagfik
38. Queen Louise Land
39. Rold Range
40. Roosevelt Range
41. Schweizerland
42. Sioraq Range (Sioraq Fjelde)
43. Stauning Alps
44. Svinhufvud Range
45. Tågefjeldene
46. Watkins Range
47. Wiedemann Range

====== United States ======
1. Adirondack Mountains, New York
2. Alaska Range, Alaska
3. Aleutian Range, Alaska
  1. Chigmit Mountains, Alaska
  2. Neacola Mountains, Alaska
4. Amargosa Range, California
5. Appalachian Mountains, Eastern United States
  1. Appalachian Plateau
    1. Catskill Mountains
    2. Cumberland Mountains
      1. Eastern Kentucky Coalfield
      2. Pine Mountains
      3. Log Mountains
    3. Allegheny Mountains
      1. Pocono Mountains
      2. Shaver's Fork Mountains
  2. Appalachian Uplands
    1. New Brunswick Highlands
    2. New England Uplands
      1. Belknap Mountains
      2. Berkshires Mountains
      3. Green Mountains
      4. Holyoke Range
      5. Hoosac Range
      6. Longfellow Mountains
      7. Metacomet Ridge Mountains
      8. Mount Tom Range
      9. Ossipee Mountains
      10. Taconic Mountains
      11. Wapack Range
      12. White Mountains
        1. Carter-Moriah Range
        2. Dartmouth Range
        3. Franconia Range
        4. Kinsman Range
        5. Mahoosuc Range
        6. Presidential Range
        7. Pilot Range
        8. Twin Range
        9. Sandwich Range
    3. Newfoundland Highlands
      1. Long Range Mountains
    4. Notre Dame Mountains
      1. Chic-Choc Mountains
      2. Collines Monteregiennes
    5. Nova Scotia Highlands
      1. Cape Breton Highlands
    6. Megantic Hills
    7. Sutton Mountains
  3. Blue Ridge Mountains
    1. Bull Run Mountains
    2. Southwest Mountains
    3. Iron Mountains
    4. Sauratown Mountains
    5. Shenandoah Mountains
    6. Unaka Mountains
    7. Bald Mountains
    8. Black Mountains
    9. Great Craggy Mountains
    10. Great Balsam Mountains
    11. Plott Balsams
    12. Great Smoky Mountains
    13. Unicoi Mountains
  4. Ridge-and-Valley Appalachians
    1. Blue Mountains
    2. Moosic Mountains
    3. South Mountains
    4. Tuscarora Mountains
6. Arbuckle Mountains, Oklahoma
7. Bears Paw Mountains, Montana
8. Beaver Lake Mountains, Utah
9. Big Snowy Mountains, Montana
10. Black Hills, South Dakota and Wyoming
11. Black Mountains, Utah
12. Blue Mountains, Oregon and Washington
13. Brooks Range, northern Alaska
  1. Baird Mountains, Alaska
    1. Jade Mountains, Alaska
  2. Davidson Mountains, Alaska
  3. De Long Mountains, Alaska
  4. Endicott Mountains, Alaska
  5. Franklin Mountains, Alaska
  6. Phillip Smith Mountains, Alaska
  7. Romanzof Mountains, Alaska
  8. Schwatka Mountains, Alaska
  9. Shubelik Mountains, Alaska
  10. Waring Mountains, Alaska
14. Bull Mountains, Montana
15. Capitan Mountains, New Mexico
16. Cascade Range, Western Canada and US
17. Castle Mountains, Montana
18. Cedar Mountains, Utah
19. Chalk Buttes, Montana
20. Chinati Mountains, Texas
21. Chisos Mountains, Texas
22. Chugach Mountains, Alaska
  1. Granite Range, Alaska
  2. Robinson Mountains, Alaska
23. Coast Mountains, Alaska, Yukon, British Columbia
24. Columbia Mountains, Canada and U.S.
  1. Monashee Mountains, British Columbia and Washington
    1. Kettle River Range, Washington and British Columbia
  2. Purcell Mountains, British Columbia and Montana
  3. Selkirk Mountains, British Columbia, Idaho and Washington
25. Coso Range, California
26. Cricket Mountains, Utah
27. Davis Mountains, Texas
28. Delamar Mountains, Nevada
29. Delaware Mountains, Texas
30. Desert Range, Nevada
31. Driftless Area, Wisconsin, Minnesota, Illinois, Iowa
  1. Ocooch Mountains, Wisconsin
32. East Desert Range, Nevada
33. East Humboldt Range, Nevada
34. Franklin Mountains, Texas
35. Gila Mountains, Arizona
36. Guadalupe Mountains, Texas
37. Highwood Mountains, Montana
38. Huron Mountains, Michigan
39. Jemez Mountains, New Mexico
40. Judith Mountains, Montana
41. Klamath Mountains, California and Oregon
  1. Marble Mountains, California
  2. Northern Yolla-Bolly Mountains, California
  3. Salmon Mountains, California
  4. Scott Mountains, California
  5. Siskiyou Mountains, Oregon and California
  6. Trinity Alps, California
  7. Trinity Mountains, California
42. Lake Range, Nevada
43. Little Rocky Range, Montana
44. Little Snowy Mountains, Montana
45. Little Wolf Mountains, Montana
46. Metacomet Ridge, Connecticut and Massachusetts
  1. Traprock Ridge, Connecticut
47. Mineral Mountains, Arizona
48. Mineral Mountains, Utah
49. Nulato Hills, Alaska
50. North Moccasin Mountains, Montana
51. Olympic Mountains, Washington
52. Oquirrh Mountains, Utah
53. Oregon Coast Range, Oregon
54. Organ Mountains, New Mexico
55. Ortiz Mountains, New Mexico
56. Pahranagat Range, Nevada
57. Panamint Range, California
58. Pavant Range, Utah
59. Peninsular Ranges, California and México
  1. Laguna Mountains, California
  2. San Jacinto Mountains, California
  3. Santa Ana Mountains, California
    1. Elsinore Mountains
  4. Temescal Mountains, California
60. Pinaleno Mountains, Arizona
61. Porcupine Mountains, Western Upper Peninsula of Michigan
62. Pryor Mountains, Montana
63. Rocky Mountains, western United States and Canada
  1. Absaroka Range, Montana and Wyoming
  2. Beartooth Mountains, Montana and Wyoming
  3. Bighorn Mountains, Montana and Wyoming
  4. Bitterroot Range, Montana and Idaho
    1. Beaverhead Mountains, Montana and Idaho
    2. Bitterroot Mountains, Montana and Idaho
    3. Centennial Mountains, Montana and Idaho
    4. Coeur d'Alène Mountains, Montana and Idaho
    5. Saint Joe Mountains, Idaho
  5. Boise Mountains, Idaho
  6. Boulder Mountains, Idaho
  7. Boulder Mountains, Montana
  8. Bridger Mountains, Wyoming
  9. Bridger Range, Montana
  10. Cabinet Mountains, Montana
  11. Clearwater Mountains, Idaho
  12. Crazy Mountains, Montana
  13. Elk Mountains, Colorado
  14. Elkhorn Mountains, Montana
  15. Flathead Range, Montana
  16. Front Range, Colorado
  17. Gallatin Range, Montana
  18. Garnet Range, Montana
  19. Granite Mountains, Wyoming
  20. Green Mountains, Wyoming
  21. Gros Ventre Range, Wyoming
  22. Henry Mountains, Utah
  23. John Long Mountains, Montana
  24. La Sal Mountains, Utah
  25. Laramie Mountains, Wyoming
  26. Lemhi Range, Idaho
  27. Lewis Range, Montana
  28. Livingston Range, Montana
  29. Madison Range, Montana
  30. Medicine Bow Mountains, Colorado and Wyoming
    1. Snowy Range, Wyoming
  31. Mosquito Range, Colorado
  32. Owl Creek Mountains, Wyoming
  33. Pioneer Mountains, Idaho
  34. Pioneer Mountains, Montana
  35. Red Mountains, Wyoming
  36. Salish Mountains, Montana
  37. Salmon River Mountains, Idaho
  38. Salt River Range, Wyoming
  39. San Juan Mountains, Colorado
  40. Sangre de Cristo Mountains, Colorado and New Mexico
  41. Sawatch Range, Colorado
  42. Sawtooth Range, Idaho
  43. Shoshone Range, Idaho
  44. Smoky Mountains, Idaho
  45. Soldier Mountains, Idaho
  46. Swan Range, Montana
  47. Tenmile Range, Colorado
  48. Teton Range, Wyoming
  49. Tobacco Root Mountains, Montana
  50. Uinta Mountains, Utah, Colorado, and Wyoming
  51. Wasatch Range, Utah
    1. Bear River Mountains, Utah and Idaho
  52. Washburn Range, Wyoming
  53. White Cloud Mountains, Idaho
  54. Whitefish Range, Montana and British Columbia
  55. Wind River Range, Wyoming
  56. Wyoming Range, Wyoming
64. Rincon Mountains, Arizona
65. Ruby Mountains, Nevada
66. Sacramento Mountains, New Mexico
67. Saint Elias Mountains, southern Alaska, Yukon and British Columbia
  1. Brabazon Range, Alaska
  2. Fairweather Range, Alaska
68. San Andres Mountains, New Mexico
69. San Francisco Mountains, Utah
70. San Francisco Peaks, Arizona
71. Sandia–Manzano Mountains, New Mexico
  1. Manzano Mountains, New Mexico
  2. Sandia Mountains, New Mexico
72. Santa Catalina Mountains, Arizona
73. Santa Rita Mountains, Arizona
74. Sawtooth Mountains, Minnesota
75. Schell Creek Range, Nevada
76. Selenite Range, Nevada
77. Seward Peninsula ranges, Alaska
  1. Bendeleben Mountains, Alaska
  2. Darby Mountains, Alaska
  3. Kigluaik Mountains, Alaska
  4. York Mountains, Alaska
78. Sheep Range, Nevada
79. Shoshone Mountains, Nevada
80. Shoshone Range, Nevada
81. Sierra Nevada, California and Nevada
82. Snake Range, Nevada
83. South Moccasin Mountains, Montana
84. Spring Mountains, Nevada
85. Star Range, Utah
86. Superstition Mountains, Arizona
87. Sutter Buttes, California
88. Sweet Grass Hills, Montana
89. Texas Hill Country, Texas
90. Toiyabe Range, Nevada
91. Tortolita Mountains, Arizona
92. Transverse Ranges, California
  1. Chalk Hills, California
  2. Little San Bernardino Mountains, California
  3. Pine Mountain Ridge, California
  4. Puente Hills, California
  5. San Bernardino Mountains, California
  6. San Emigdio Mountains, California
  7. San Gabriel Mountains, California
  8. San Jose Hills, California
  9. San Rafael Hills, California
  10. San Rafael Mountains, California
  11. Santa Monica Mountains, California
  12. Santa Susana Mountains, California
  13. Santa Ynez Mountains, California
  14. Shandin Hills, California
  15. Sierra Pelona Ridge, California
  16. Simi Hills, California
  17. Tehachapi Mountains, California
  18. Topatopa Mountains, California
93. Tucson Mountains, Arizona
94. Tushar Mountains, Utah
95. U.S. Interior Highlands, Arkansas, Missouri, Oklahoma
  1. Ouachita Mountains, Arkansas and Oklahoma
  2. Ozark Plateau, Missouri, Arkansas, and Oklahoma
    1. Boston Mountains, Arkansas
    2. St. Francois Mountains, Missouri
96. Uwharrie Mountains, North Carolina
97. Virginia Mountains, Nevada
98. West Humboldt Range, Nevada
99. West Mountains, Idaho
100. White Mountains, Alaska
101. White Mountains, Arizona
102. White Mountains, California
103. Wichita Mountains, Oklahoma
104. Wolf Mountains, Montana

==== Oceania ====
===== Australia =====
1. Arthur Range
2. Blue Mountains
3. Flinders Ranges
4. Great Dividing Range
5. Hammersley Range
6. MacDonnell Ranges
7. Pelion Range
8. Stirling Range

===== New Guinea =====
====== Papua New Guinea ======
1. Bismarck Range
2. Owen Stanley Range

====== Western New Guinea ======
1. Arfak Mountains
2. Jayawijaya Mountains

===== New Zealand =====
1. Arrowsmith Range
2. Ben Ohau Range
3. Blue Mountains
4. Bombay Hills
5. Butler Range (Canterbury)
6. Butler Range (West Coast)
7. Cameron Mountains
8. Catlins Range
9. Coromandel Range
10. Craigieburn Range
11. Crown Range
12. Dark Cloud Range
13. Darran Mountains
14. Dunstan Mountains
15. Earl Mountains
16. Franklin Mountains
17. Glasgow Range
18. Hakarimata Range
19. Hapuakohe Range
20. Herangi Range
21. Huiarau Range
22. Humboldt Mountains
23. Hundalee Hills
24. Hunter Mountains
25. Hunua Ranges
26. Kā Mauka-Tokoweka
27. Kaikōura Ranges
28. Kaimai Range
29. Kaitake Range
30. Kakanui Range
31. Kākāpō Range
32. Kaweka Range
33. Kepler Mountains
34. Mount Cook Range
35. Lammerlaw Range
36. Lammermoor Range
37. Livingstone Mountains
38. Moehau Range
39. Murchison Mountains
40. Old Man Range / Kopuwai
41. Papahaua Range
42. Paparoa Range
43. Pisa Range
44. Port Hills
45. Pouākai Range
46. Rangitoto Range
47. Rock and Pillar Range
48. Spenser Mountains
49. Stuart Mountains
50. Raukūmara Range
51. Richmond Range
52. The Remarkables
53. Remutaka Range
54. Ruahine Range
55. The Silverpeaks
56. Southern Alps
57. Spenser Mountains
58. Hector Mountains
59. Tararua Range
60. Two Thumb Range
61. Waitākere Ranges
62. Wharepapa / Arthur Range
63. Wick Mountains

==== South America ====
===== Andes =====
The longest mountain range in the world (above sea level) is the Andes, consisting of several subranges.

1. Cordillera de los Andes, in Argentina, Bolivia, Chile, Colombia, Ecuador, Peru, and Venezuela:
  1. Cordillera Central, Colombia
  2. Cordillera Occidental, Colombia
  3. Cordillera Oriental, Colombia, Venezuela
    1. Serranía del Perijá, Colombia, Venezuela
    2. Serranía de los Churumbelos, Colombia
  4. Cordillera Real, Ecuador
  5. Cordillera Occidental, Ecuador
  6. Cordillera Occidental, Peru
    1. Cordillera Blanca, Peru
    2. Cordillera Huayhuash, Peru
    3. Cordillera Negra, Peru
  7. Cordillera Central, Peru
  8. Cordillera Oriental, Peru
  9. Cordillera Central, Bolivia
    1. Cordillera Real
  10. Cordillera Oriental, Bolivia
    1. Serranía de Charagua
    2. Serranía del Aguaragüe
  11. Cordillera Occidental, Bolivia, Chile
  12. Cordillera de Lípez, Argentina, Bolivia
  13. Cordillera Domeyko, Chile
  14. Cordón de Lila, Chile
  15. Sierra de Almeida, Chile
  16. Sierra de Famatina, Argentina
  17. Frontal Cordillera, Argentina
  18. Principal Cordillera, Argentina, Chile
    1. Cordillera de la Ramada, Argentina
  19. Sierra de Velasco, Argentina
  20. Cordillera de Talinay, Chile
  21. Cordillera Negra (Chile), Chile
  22. Cordillera del Paine, Chile
  23. Sierra Baguales, Argentina, Chile
  24. Cordillera Sarmiento, Chile
  25. Cordillera Riesco, Chile
  26. Cordillera Darwin, Chile
  27. Martial Mountains, Argentina
  28. Dientes de Navarino, Chile

===== Extra-Andean mountain ranges =====
Other ranges in South America include:

1. Sierra de La Ventana, Argentina
2. Sierras Pampeanas, Argentina
  1. Sierras de Córdoba, Argentina
3. Sistema de Tandilia, Argentina
4. Guiana Highlands, Brazil, Guyana, Venezuela
5. Serranías Chiquitanas, Bolivia
6. Serra dos Aimorés, Brazil
7. Borborema Plateau, Brazil
8. Chapada, Brazil
9. Chapada do Araripe, Brazil
10. Espinhaço Mountains, Brazil
11. Chapada dos Guimarães, Brazil
12. Chapada das Mangabeiras, Brazil
13. Mantiqueira Mountains, Brazil
14. Serra do Mar, Brazil
15. Serra do Cristal, Brazil
16. Serra Gaúcha, Brazil
17. Serra dos Órgãos, Brazil
18. Serra Geral, Brazil
19. Serra de Ibiapaba, Brazil
20. Serra do Rio do Rastro, Brazil
21. Serra do Tiracambu, Brazil
22. Serras de Sudeste, Brazil
23. Chilean Coast Range, Chile
  1. Sierra Vicuña Mackenna
  2. Cordillera de Mahuidanchi
  3. Cordillera de Nahuelbuta
  4. Cordillera Pelada
  5. Cordillera del Piuchén
  6. Cordillera de Pirulil
  7. Cordillera del Sarao
  8. Cordillera de Talinay
24. Cordón Baquedano, Chile
25. Baudó Mountains, Colombia
26. Serranía de Macuira, Colombia
27. Sierra Nevada de Santa Marta, Colombia
28. Serrania de la Macarena, Colombia
29. Ybytyruzú Mountains, Paraguay
30. Cuchilla de Haedo, Uruguay
31. Cuchilla Grande, Uruguay

=== Ocean ===
- Emperor Seamounts
- Mid-ocean ridge (the longest mountain range on Earth)
  - Gakkel Ridge
  - Mid-Atlantic Ridge
  - Southwest Indian Ridge
  - Central Indian Ridge
  - Southeast Indian Ridge
  - Pacific-Antarctic Ridge
  - East Pacific Rise
- Ninety East Ridge

== Extraterrestrial mountain ranges ==
=== Iapetus ===
- Equatorial ridge

=== Mars ===
- Centauri Montes
- Charitum Montes
- Erebus Montes
- Hellespontus Montes
- Nereidum Montes

=== Mercury ===
- Caloris Montes

=== The Moon ===
By IAU convention, lunar mountain ranges are given Latin names.

- Montes Agricola
- Montes Alpes
- Montes Recti
- Montes Retacule
- Montes Riphaeus
- Montes Rook
- Montes Secchi
- Montes Spitzbergen
- Montes Taurus
- Montes Teneriffe

=== Pluto ===
- Al-Idrisi Montes
- Baret Montes
- Elcano Montes
- Hillary Montes
- Pigafetta Montes
- Tabei Montes
- Tenzing Montes (formerly Norgay Montes)
- Zheng He Montes

=== Titan ===
- Mithrim Montes

=== Venus ===
- Maxwell Montes

== See also ==
- Mountain
- Mountain range
- List of highest mountains
- List of mountain ranges in Asia
- List of mountains on the Moon
- List of tallest mountains in the Solar System
- List of mountains on Mars by height
- Frontal Cordillera
- Principal Cordillera
- Seven Summits
