= Tigbao =

Tigbao can refer to:

- the municipality of Tigbao, Zamboanga del Sur in the Philippines
- the barangay of Tigbao, Cagdianao, Dinagat Islands in the Philippines
- the Filipino word for a grass of the genus Acanthus, also known as Bear's breech

== See also ==
- Tigbauan (Philippines)
