= Yakutat =

Yakutat may refer to:

== People ==
- Yakutat Tlingit Tribe, a federally recognized Alaska Native tribe

== Geography ==
- Yakutat, Alaska, a unified city-borough in Alaska
- Yakutat Bay, a bay on the coast of Alaska
- Yakutat Airport, a state-owned public-use airport in Alaska in the United States
- Yakutat Army Airfield, a former United States Army airfield which was redeveloped into the current airport
- Yakutat Colony, a former Russian penal colony on the U.S. National Register of Historic Places
- Yakutat Glacier, Glacier in Alaska

== Ships ==
- USS Yakutat (AVP-32), a United States Navy seaplane tender in commission from 1944 to 1946
- USCGC Yakutat (WAVP-380), later WHEC-380, a United States Coast Guard cutter in commission from 1948 to 1971

== Other uses ==
- Yakutat Block, a fragment of the Earth's crust in the process of accreting to the North American continent along the south central coast of Alaska
- Yakutat, a dialect of the Tlingit language
