= Mount Moresby =

Mountain in British Columbia, Canada

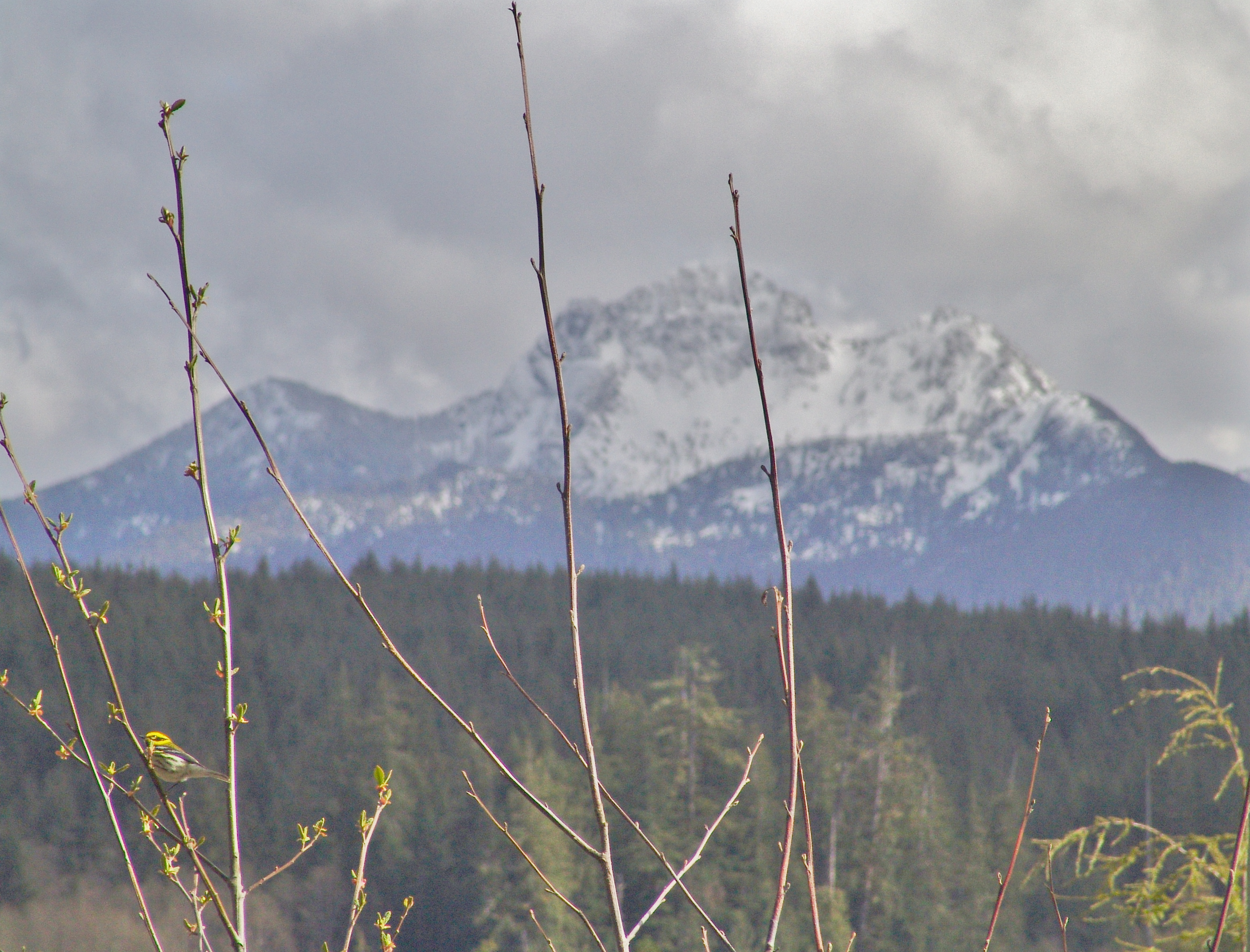
- Mount Moresby through some plant growth

Highest point
- Elevation: 1,164 m (3,819 ft)
- Prominence: 1,164 m (3,819 ft)
- Listing: Mountains of British Columbia; North America isolated peak 113th; Canada most isolated peaks 34th
- Coordinates: 53°01′09″N 132°05′08″W

Geography
- Location within British Columbia
- Interactive map of Mount Moresby
- Location: Moresby Island, British Columbia, Canada
- District: Queen Charlotte Land District
- Parent range: Queen Charlotte Mountains
- Topo map: NTS 103F1 Skidegate Channel

Mount Moresby is the highest mountain (1,164 metres (3,819 ft)) of the Queen Charlotte Mountains, located 26 kilometres (16 mi) south of Daajing Giids (formerly Queen Charlotte) on Moresby Island in British Columbia, Canada.

The mountain is located around 53 degrees N on Haida Gwaii (formerly the Queen Charlotte Islands).

== Geography ==
Mount Moresby is located on Moresby Island, which is the more southern of the two main islands of Haida Gwaii. There are two lakes near it.

=== Nature ===
Mount Moresby has a wide range of climate sub-types and environments. The flatland around the mountain is at the seaside and have abundant birdlife (they are within a key migratory route). The lower slopes boast wind-sculpted cedar, pine and western hemlock forests, grading to sub-alpine moorland with stunted mountain hemlocks (and a subpolar oceanic climate) on the higher slopes near the summit.

The mountain and the sounds around it are home to abundant wildlife, such as black bears, whales, orcas, sea lions, and hundreds of thousands of seabirds. There are also invasive Sitka black-tailed deer, porpoises, dolphins, and tidal-zone animals in the area.

Haida Gwaii has four subpopulations of an endangered plant: Oxystegus recurvifolius, endemic to remote islands in the North Pacific. This plant only thrives in extreme oceanic, mediterranean, and maritime subpolar climates with ultra-high precipitation levels.

=== Climate ===
Mount Moresby has a borderline Cfc (subpolar oceanic) and Cfb (mid-latitude variant) climate. The average high in August is 17 °C (63 °F)), and the average low in February and March is 1 °C (34 °F), showing extreme ocean moderation. Snow is somewhat common in the winter months (November to March), at 25 days per year on average, but usually doesn't fall in the warm season (May to September). The snowiest month of the year is January, averaging a week of measurable snow (>50 mm (2 in)).

The winter-summer temperature swings of Mount Moresby are extremely oceanic compared to other places at similar latitudes (Goose Bay, Canada; Khabarovsk, Russia), as well as areas slightly farther south (Qiqihar, China; Augusta, Maine), even accounting for the somewhat high elevation.

Climate data for Mount Moresby, Haida Gwaii, BC, Canada
Month	Jan	Feb	Mar	Apr	May	Jun	Jul	Aug	Sep	Oct	Nov	Dec	Year
Record high (°C, °F)	11 °C (52 °F)	11 °C (52 °F)	14 °C (57 °F)	18 °C (64 °F)	20 °C (68 °F)	24 °C (75 °F)	25 °C (77 °F)	24 °C (75 °F)	22 °C (72 °F)	18 °C (64 °F)	14 °C (57 °F)	11 °C (52 °F)	25 °C (77 °F)
Average high °C, °F)	5 °C (41 °F)	6 °C (43 °F)	6 °C (43 °F)	8 °C (46 °F)	11 °C (52 °F)	13 °C (55 °F)	16 °C (61 °F)	17 °C (63 °F)	14 °C (57 °F)	11 °C (52 °F)	7 °C (45 °F)	6 °C (43 °F)	10 °C (50 °F)
Average low (°C, °F)	1 °C (34 °F)	1 °C (34 °F)	2 °C (36 °F)	3 °C (37 °F)	6 °C (43 °F)	8 °C (46 °F)	11 °C (52 °F)	12 °C (54 °F)	9 °C (48 °F)	7 °C (45 °F)	3 °C (37 °F)	2 °C (36 °F)	6 °C (43 °F)
Record low (°C, °F)	−16 °C (3 °F)	−9 °C (16 °F)	−9 °C (16 °F)	−3 °C (27 °F)	−1 °C (30 °F)	3 °C (37 °F)	6 °C (43 °F)	7 °C (45 °F)	4 °C (39 °F)	−1 °C (30 °F)	−8 °C (18 °F)	−11 °C (12 °F)	−16 °C (3 °F)
Average rainfall (mm, in)	232 mm (9 in)	154 mm (6 in)	177 mm (7 in)	136 mm (5 in)	87 mm (3 in)	81 mm (3 in)	74 mm (3 in)	96 mm (4 in)	150 mm (6 in)	257 mm (10 in)	250 mm (10 in)	251 mm (10 in)	1,934 mm (76 in)
Average snowy days	7	4	5	1	0	0	0	0	0	1	2	5	25

Source: (MSN)

== Natives ==
There are indigenous Canadians (the Haida people) on Moresby Island. A village, called Daajing Giids, of 950 people exists near Mount Moresby. The Haidas live in and around the Mount Moresby area in longhice.

== Climbing ==
There is a trail called Mount Moresby Trail that leads up to the summit.

== See also ==
- San Christoval Range; Mount Moresby is within this sub-range
- Pacific Cordillera
