= Lake Alta =

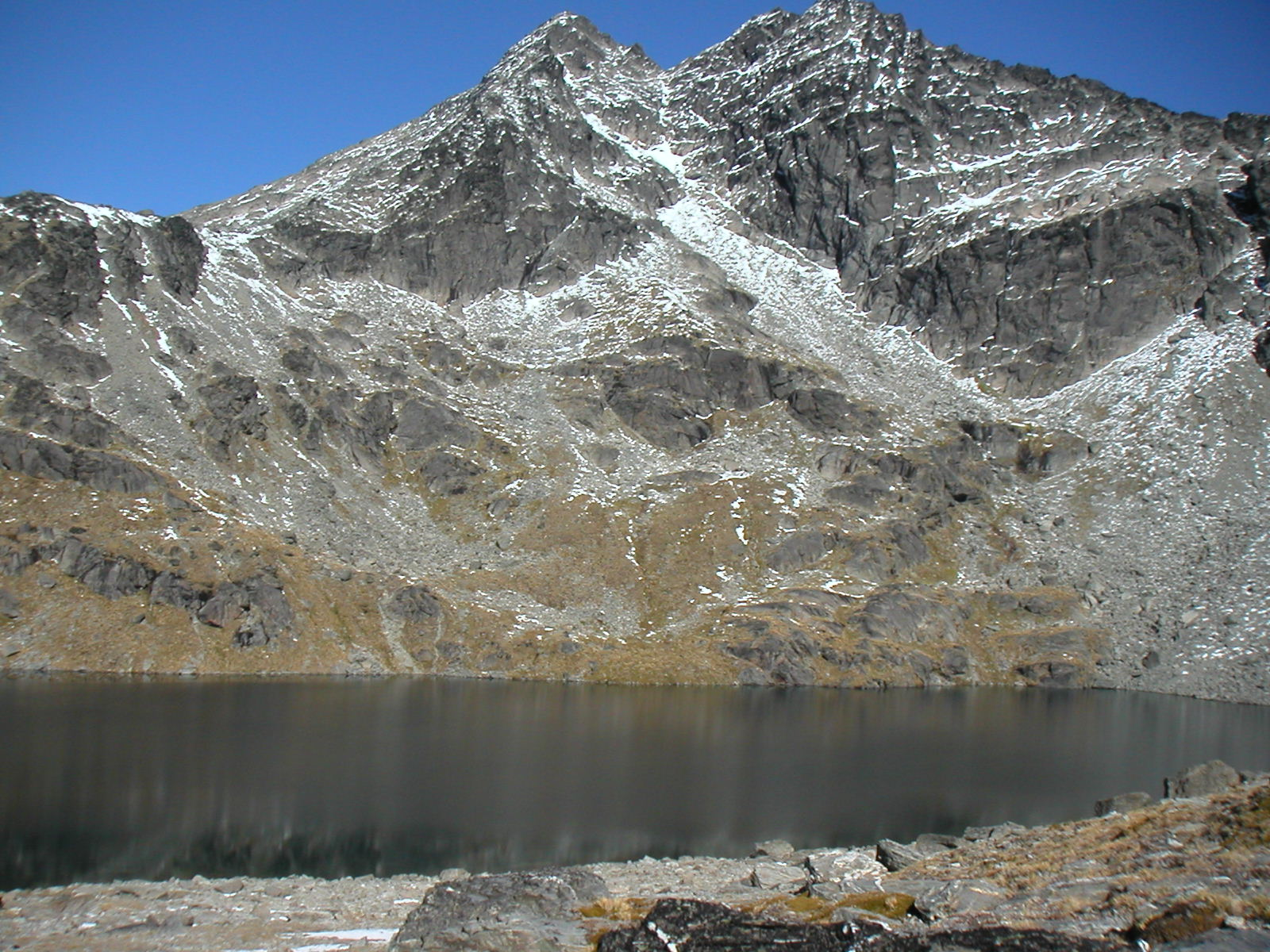
- In late April 2007, the snow is minimal. In winter it is frozen solid. the double cone peaks of The Remarkables are in the background.

- Location within New Zealand
- Location: The Remarkables, South Island
- Coordinates: 45°3′50.78″S 168°48′35.52″E
- Type: Cirque lake
- Primary inflows: snow melt
- Basin countries: New Zealand
- Max. length: 500 m (1,600 ft)
- Max. width: 250 m (820 ft)
- Surface elevation: 1,800 m (5,900 ft)

Lake Alta is a glacial lake in The Remarkables near Queenstown in the South Island of New Zealand. It is approximately 500 metres by 250 metres in size and freezes over in the winter months. At this time it is used by skiers and snowboarders. It is used by divers who hold an annual ice dive there, as well as Antarctica New Zealand diver pre deployment training.
