= Yakutat Glacier =

Glacier in Alaska

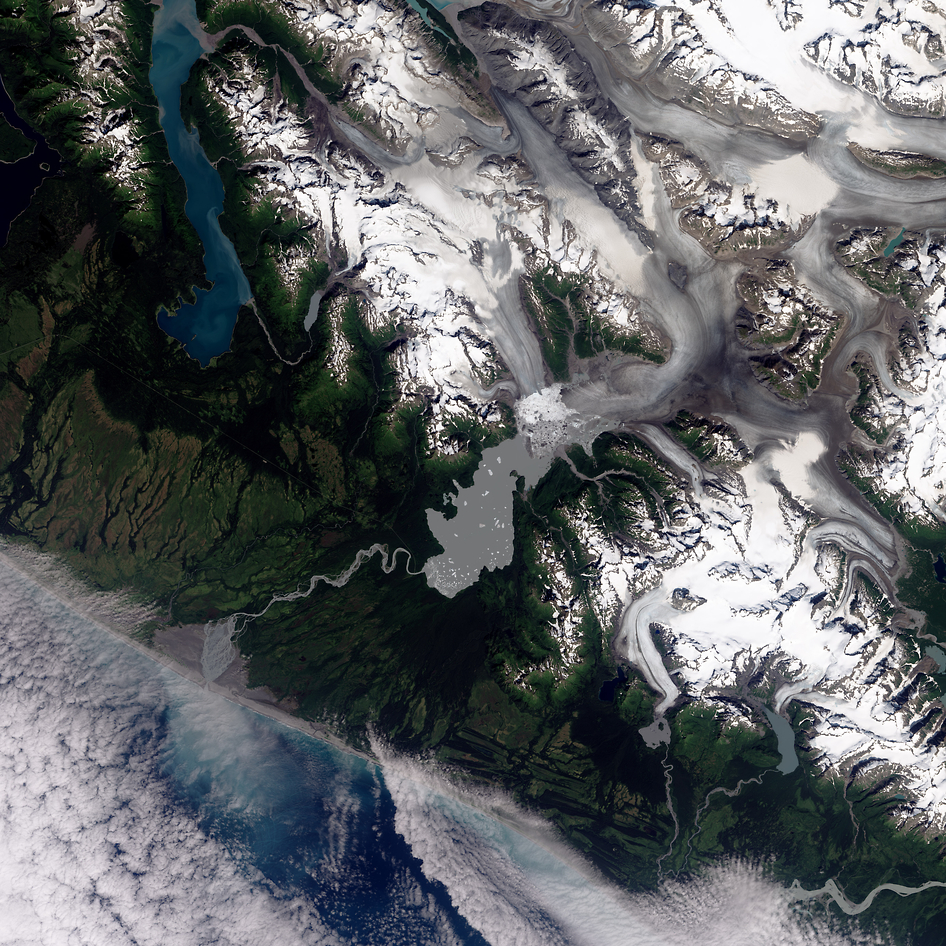
- Retreat of Yakutat Glacier.

- Location within Alaska
- Interactive map of Yakutat Glacier
- Location: Yakutat Ice Field, Yakutat City and Borough, Alaska, U.S.
- Coordinates: 59°35′N 138°38′W
- Area: 1,000 km^{2} (400 sq mi)
- Length: 51 kilometres (32 mi)
- Thickness: 550 m (1,800 ft)
- Terminus: Harlequin Lake, the Gulf of Alaska.
- Status: Retreating

The Yakutat Glacier is a glacier in the Brabazon Range of southeastern Alaska. It is one of the fastest moving glaciers in the world, and has been retreating since Little Ice Age. Approximate elevation 1,010 feet (310 meters).

== See also ==
- List of glaciers
