= List of mountain ranges in Asia =

This is a list of mountain ranges in Asia.

== Lists ==
Name	Country	'Approx. length (km)	Highest mountain	'Max height (m)
Al Hajar Mountains	Oman, United Arab Emirates	500	Jebel Shams	3,009
Alagalla Mountain Range (Potato Range)	Sri Lanka			1,140
Alay Mountains (Alai Mountains)	Kyrgyzstan, Tajikistan	350	Pik Tandykul	5,544
Alborz	Iran	900	Damavand	5,625
Altai Mountains	Russia, China, Mongolia, Kazakhstan	2,000	Belukha	4,506
Annamite Range	Laos, Viet Nam	1,100	Phou Bia	2,819
Anti-Lebanon	Lebanon, Syria, Israel	150	Mount Hermon	2,814
Mount Apo	Mindanao, Philippines		Mount Apo	2,954
Aravalli Range	India	692	Guru Shikhar	1,722
Asir Mountains	Saudi Arabia, Yemen		Jabal Sawda	3,000 approx.
Barisan Mountains	Indonesia	1,700	Mount Kerinci	3,800
Caraballo Mountains	Philippines			1,588
Cardamom Mountains (Krâvanh Mountains)	Cambodia, Thailand	300	Phnom Aural	1,813
Caucasus Mountains	Russia, Georgia, Azerbaijan, Armenia, Turkey	1,100	Mount Elbrus	5,642
Central Mountain Range (Taiwan Mountains)	Taiwan		Xiuguluan Mountain	3,860
Chukotka Mountains	Russia	1,300	Iskhodnaya	1,843
Chersky Range	Russia	1,500	Peak Pobeda	3,003
Chagai Hills	Pakistan	130	Malik Naru	2,412
Cordillera Central	Philippines		Mount Pulag	2,922
Crocker Mountains	Malaysia		Mount Kinabalu	4,095
Dzhugdzhur Mountains	Russia	700	Mount Topko	1,906
Eastern Ghats	India		Arma Konda	1,680
Galyat	Pakistan		Miranjani	2,992
Haraz Mountains	Yemen			
Hijaz Mountains	Saudi Arabia		Jabal Werqaan	2,393
Himalaya	Nepal, Bhutan, China, India, Pakistan	2,400	Mount Everest	8,848
Hindu Kush	Afghanistan, Pakistan	800	Tirich Mir	7,708
Hindu Raj	Pakistan		Koyo Zom	6,872
Japanese Alps Hida Mountains	Japan	105	Mount Hotaka	3,190
Japanese Alps Kiso Mountains	Japan	65	Mount Kisokoma	2,956
Japanese Alps Akaishi Mountains	Japan	120	Mount Kita	3,193
Kabir Kuh	Iran, Iraq	175	Kan Seifi	3,050
Karakoram	Pakistan, China, India	500	K2	8,611
Khibiny Mountains (Khibinsky Mountains)	Russia		Yudychvumchorr	1,201
Khingan Mountains (Greater Khingan)	China	1,200		2,035
Kitanglad Mountain Range	Philippines		Mount Dulang-dulang	2,941
Kirthar Mountains	Pakistan	310	Zardak Peak	2,151
Knuckles Mountain Range (Dumbara)	Sri Lanka			1,863
Kolyma Mountains (Gydan Mountains)	Russia	1,300	Gora Nevskaya	1,828
Koryak Mountains	Russia	880	Mount Ledianaia	2,562
Kunlun Mountains	China (Tibet)	3,000	Liushi Shan	7,167
Kuray Mountains	Russia			3,446
Lower Himalayan Range (Lesser Himalaya, Mahabharat Range)	India, Nepal, Bhutan	2,400		
Margalla Hills	Pakistan		Tilla Charouni	1,604
Mount Carmel	Israel	39		525
Mount Lebanon	Lebanon	180		3090
Pamir Mountains	Tajikistan, Kyrgyzstan, Afghanistan, China		Kongur Tagh	7,649
Paropamisus Mountains	Afghanistan			3,592 m
Pontic Mountains	Turkey	1,000	Mount Kaçkar	3,937
Salt Range	Pakistan	175	Sakesar	1,522
Sayan Mountains	Russia, Mongolia	1,500	Mönkh Saridag	3,492
Sierra Madre	Philippines	680	Mount Guiwan	1,915
Sikhote-Alin	Russia	900	Tordoki Yani	2,090
Siwalik Range (Churia Hills, Sub-himalaya, Outer Himalaya)	India, Nepal, Bhutan	2,400		
Spīn Ghar (Safed Koh)	Afghanistan, Pakistan	160	Mount Sikaram	4,761
Stanovoi Range	Russia	900		2,460
Sulaiman Mountains	Pakistan, Afghanistan, Iran	483	Loe Nekan	3,578
Taurus Mountains	Turkey	1,500	Mount Ararat	5,137
Tian Shan (Celestial Mountains)	China, Kazakhstan, Kyrgyzstan	2,900	Jengish Chokusu	7,439
Titiwangsa Mountains	Malaysia	480	Gunung Korbu	2,183
Toba Kakar Range	Afghanistan, Pakistan	360	Takht-i-Sulaiman	3,449
Ural Mountains	Russia	2,500	Mount Narodnaya	1,895
Verkhoyansk Range	Russia	1,100	Mus-Khaya	2,959
Western Ghats	India	1,600	Anamudi	2,695
Zagros Mountains	Iran, Iraq	1,800	Qash-Mastan (Dena)	4,409
Zambales Mountains	Philippines	180	Mount Tapulao	2,037
Zamboanga Cordilleras	Philippines		Mount Timolan	1,137
