= Insular Mountains =

Mountain range in Canada

- French: Monts Insulaires
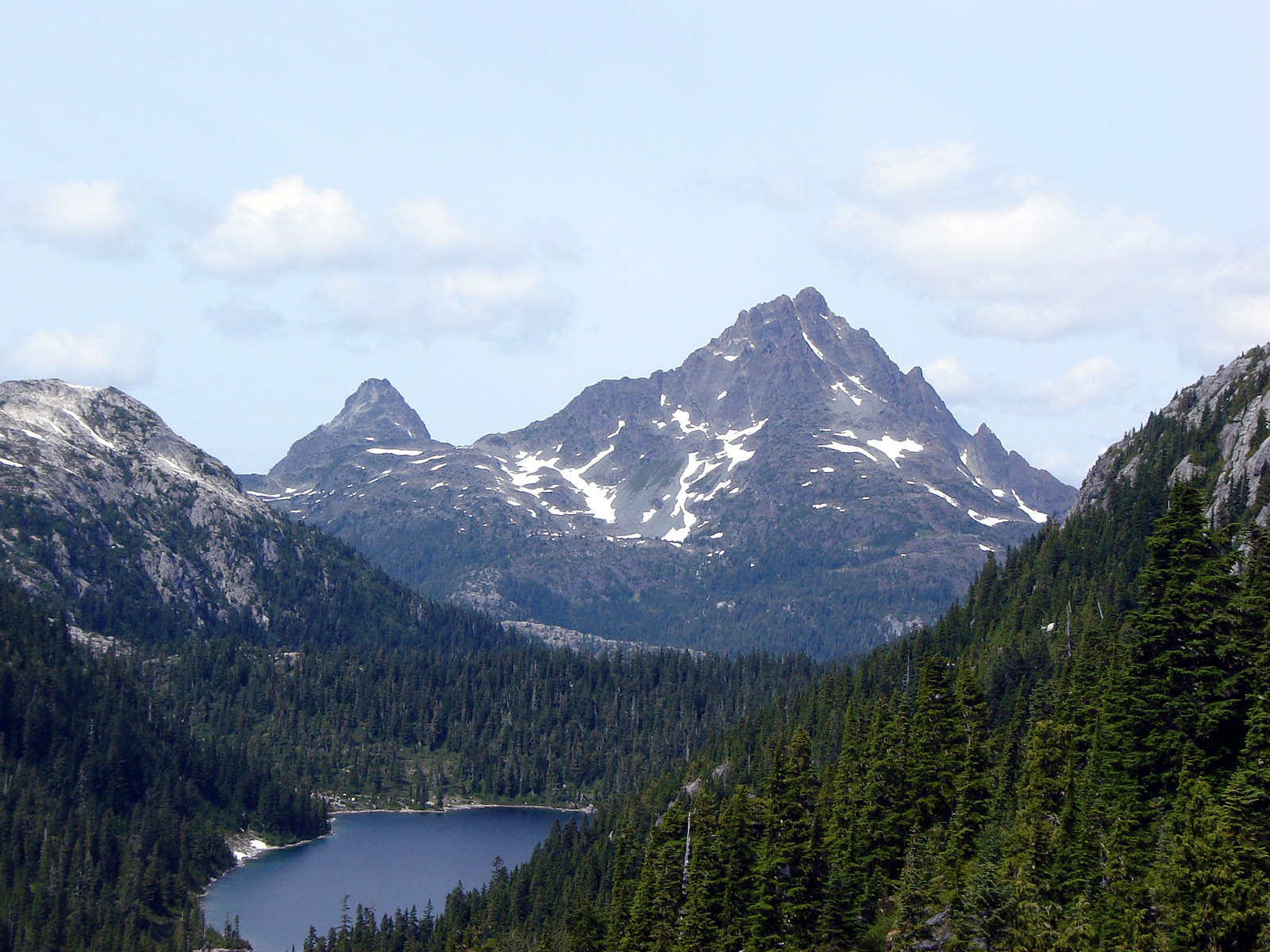
- Golden Hinde, south aspect, August 2006.

Highest point
- Peak: Golden Hinde, Vancouver Island
- Elevation: 2,196.818 m (7,207.41 ft)
- Coordinates: 49°39′43.8″N 125°44′48.6″W

Dimensions
- Area: 133,879 km^{2} (51,691 mi^{2})

Geography
- Location within British Columbia
- Country: Canada
- Province: British Columbia
- Parent range: Pacific Cordillera

The Insular Mountains are a range of mountains in the Pacific Coast Ranges on the Coast of British Columbia, Canada, comprising the Vancouver Island Ranges and Queen Charlotte Mountains. The Insular Mountains are rugged, particularly on Vancouver Island where peaks in Strathcona Provincial Park rise to elevations of more than 2,000 m (6,562 ft). The highest of these mountains is Golden Hinde on Vancouver Island, which rises to 2,196.818 m (7,207 ft).

Although the Coast Mountain Range is usually referred to as the westernmost range of the Pacific Cordillera (since it is the westernmost range on the main landmass at that point), the Insular Mountains are the true westernmost range.

== Geological history ==
These Insular Mountains are not yet fully emerged above sea level, and Vancouver Island and the Haida Gwaii are just the higher elevations of the range, which was in fact fully exposed during the last glacial period (maximum ice extent about 18,000 years ago) when the continental shelf in this area was a broad coastal plain.

The Insular Mountains formed when a chain of active volcanic islands (the Insular Islands) collided against the North American continent during the mid Cretaceous period. The type of rocks that form the Insular Mountains are turbidites and pillow lavas. Granitic plutons seldom occur in the Insular Mountains, unlike the Coast Mountains. The Insular Mountain range covers some 133,879 km^{2} (51,691 sq mi). It experiences frequent seismic activity, with the Pacific Plate and the Juan de Fuca Plate being subducted into the Earth's mantle. Large earthquakes have led to collapsing mountains, landslides and fissures.

During the last glacial period, ice enclosed nearly all of these mountains. Glaciers that ran down to the Pacific Ocean sharpened the valley faces and eroded their bottoms. These valleys were transformed into fjords when the ice melted and the sea level rose. Ice Age remnants may still be noted, such as the Comox Glacier in the Vancouver Island Ranges.

== Sub-ranges ==
=== Haida Gwaii ===
- Queen Charlotte Mountains, on Haida Gwaii:
1. Cameron Range: On the western side of Graham Island
2. Crease Range: On north-central Graham Island
3. McKay Range: On the south coast of Graham Island
4. San Christoval Range: On the western side of Moresby Island

=== Vancouver Island ===
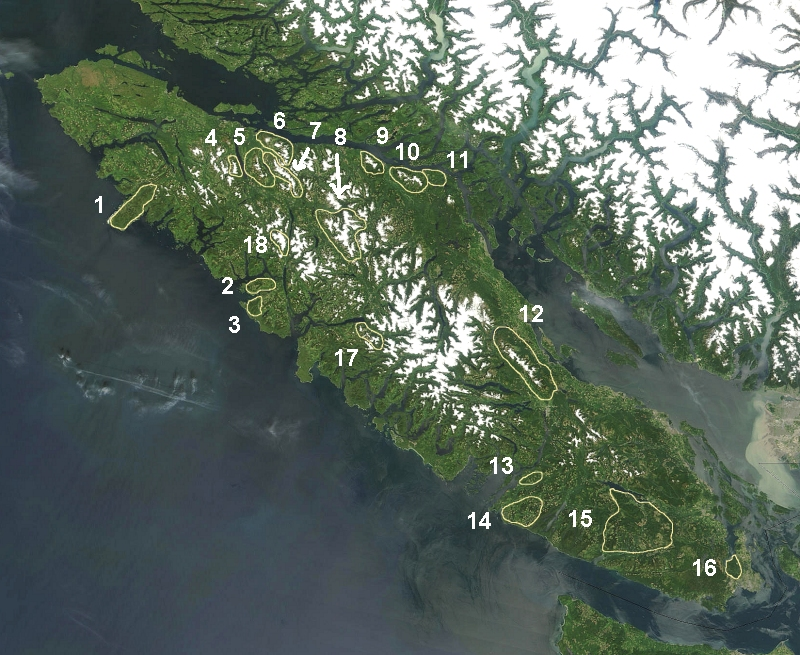
Named Ranges of Vancouver Island

- Vancouver Island Ranges, on Vancouver Island:
1. Refugium Range: On the Brooks Peninsula
2. Sophia Range: On Nootka Island, on the peninsula between Esperanza Inlet and Nuchatlitz Inlet
3. Genevieve Range: Nootka Island
4. Karmutzen Range: Between Nimpkish Lake, Tlakwa Creek and Karmuzten Creek
5. Hankin Range: Between Nimpkish Lake and Bonanza Lake
6. Franklin Range: Near Robson Bight on the Johnstone Strait between the Tsitika River and Kokish River
7. Bonanza Range: Between the Nimpkish River and the Tsitika River by Bonanza Lake
8. Sutton Range: Between Nimpkish River, White River, Oktwanch River, Gold River
9. Newcastle Range: Johnstone Strait, west of Sayward-Kelsey Bay and east/north of Adams River
10. Prince of Wales Range: East coast of Vancouver Island 40 km (25 mi) north of Campbell River
11. Halifax Range: Along Johnstone Strait between Amor de Cosmos Creek and Pye Creek
12. Beaufort Range: North of Port Alberni and west of Qualicum Beach
13. Pelham Range: Between the Sarita River and Alberni Inlet
14. Somerset Range: Between The Pacheena-Sarita River basins and the Klanawa River (between Nitinat Lake and Imperial Eagle Channel)
15. Seymour Range: Between the valley of Cowichan Lake, San Juan River and Gordon River
16. Gowlland Range: Near Victoria between Saanich Inlet and Brentwood Bay. Includes Mount Work Regional Park
17. Pierce Range: South of Gold River between the Jacklah River and the Burman River
18. Haihte Range: Between Tashsis River, the Nomash River, Zeballos Lake and Woss Lake

The Elk River Mountains, located in Strathcona Provincial Park, are sometimes classified as a range.

== See also ==
- Volcanism in Canada
- Geology of the Pacific Northwest
