= Cameron Range =

Mountain range in Canada

- Location within British Columbia

Geography
- Country: Canada
- Region: British Columbia
- Range coordinates: 53°37′N 132°50′W
- Parent range: Queen Charlotte Mountains

The Cameron Range is a small, low mountain range in northwestern British Columbia, Canada, located on the north side of Port Chanal on the western side of Graham Island of Haida Gwaii. It has an area of 41 km^{2} (16 sq mi), and is a subrange of the Queen Charlotte Mountains, which, in turn, forms a part of the Insular Mountains.
