= Mount Timolan Protected Landscape =

Protected area in Mindanao, Philippines

- Zamboanga del Sur Provincial Park
- IUCN category V (protected landscape/seascape)
- Location within Philippines
- Location: Zamboanga del Sur, Philippines
- Nearest city: Pagadian
- Coordinates: 7°47′58″N 123°14′54″E
- Area: 1,994.79 hectares (4,929.2 acres)
- Established: August 14, 2000
- Governing body: Department of Environment and Natural Resources

The Mount Timolan Protected Landscape is a protected area covering Mount Timolan and its surrounding forested landscape in the region of Zamboanga Peninsula on Mindanao in the Philippines. The park encompasses an area of 1,994.79 hectares (4,929.2 acres) and a buffer zone of 695.39 hectares (1,718.3 acres) in the municipalities of San Miguel, Guipos and Tigbao in the province of Zamboanga del Sur. It was established on 14 August 2000 through Proclamation Order No. 354 issued by President Joseph Estrada. The park was also earlier established by the provincial government of Zamboanga del Sur as a provincial park and wildlife sanctuary known as the Zamboanga del Sur Provincial Park through Provincial Ordinance No. 3 in 1992.

== Description ==
The protected landscape is an important watershed of several river systems supporting irrigation for the surrounding rice paddies and lowland communities. It spans six barangays or rural villages in Tigbao namely, New Tuburan, Timolan, Upper Nilo, Maragang, Limas and Guinling, and one each in San Miguel and Guipos municipalities namely, Dumalinao and Datagan, respectively. The park is characterized by steep slopes and dividing ridges, with rolling to moderately undulating topography. Lowland forests cover eighty percent (80%) of the landscape with the remaining areas consisting of secondary grassland. The headwaters of the Dinas and Labangan rivers are found here, and is also crossed by the Limonan, Lapuyan and Kumalarang rivers. The park also contains several streams and freshwater lakes, including Lake Timolan which has been transformed into a marshy area.

=== Mount Timolan ===
Mount Timolan is a semi-conical mountain in New Tuburan and Timolan in Tigbao rising to 1,177 metres (3,862 ft) above sea level. It is considered the highest peak in the province situated in the Zamboanga Cordillera mountain range that runs north to south between the provinces of Zamboanga del Norte and Zamboanga del Sur and Zamboanga Sibugay in the Mindanao peninsula of Zamboanga. Located some 20 kilometres (12 mi) inland from the provincial capital city of Pagadian just to the south of Mount Sugarloaf, the top of the mountain has a crater lake known as Lake Maragang.

== Biodiversity ==
Mount Timolan's landscape area is composed of 80% natural dipterocarp forests, as well 7% man-made forest plantation of gmelina and acacia. In the open bushland grow cogon grass and other species of family Graminae. It is an important bird area being home to the Philippine eagle, Philippine cockatoo, Philippine hawk eagle, brahminy kite, hornbill kite, wild ducks, pigeons, fruit doves, and jungle owls. It is also a habitat of the Philippine tarsier, Philippine warty pig, Asian palm civet cat (also known as alamid), Philippine pygmy squirrel, Philippine tree squirrel, and reptiles such as the Philippine sailfin lizard, water monitor, snakes and geckos.
