= Hector Mountains =

Mountain range in New Zealand

Tapuae-o-Uenuku / Hector Mountains
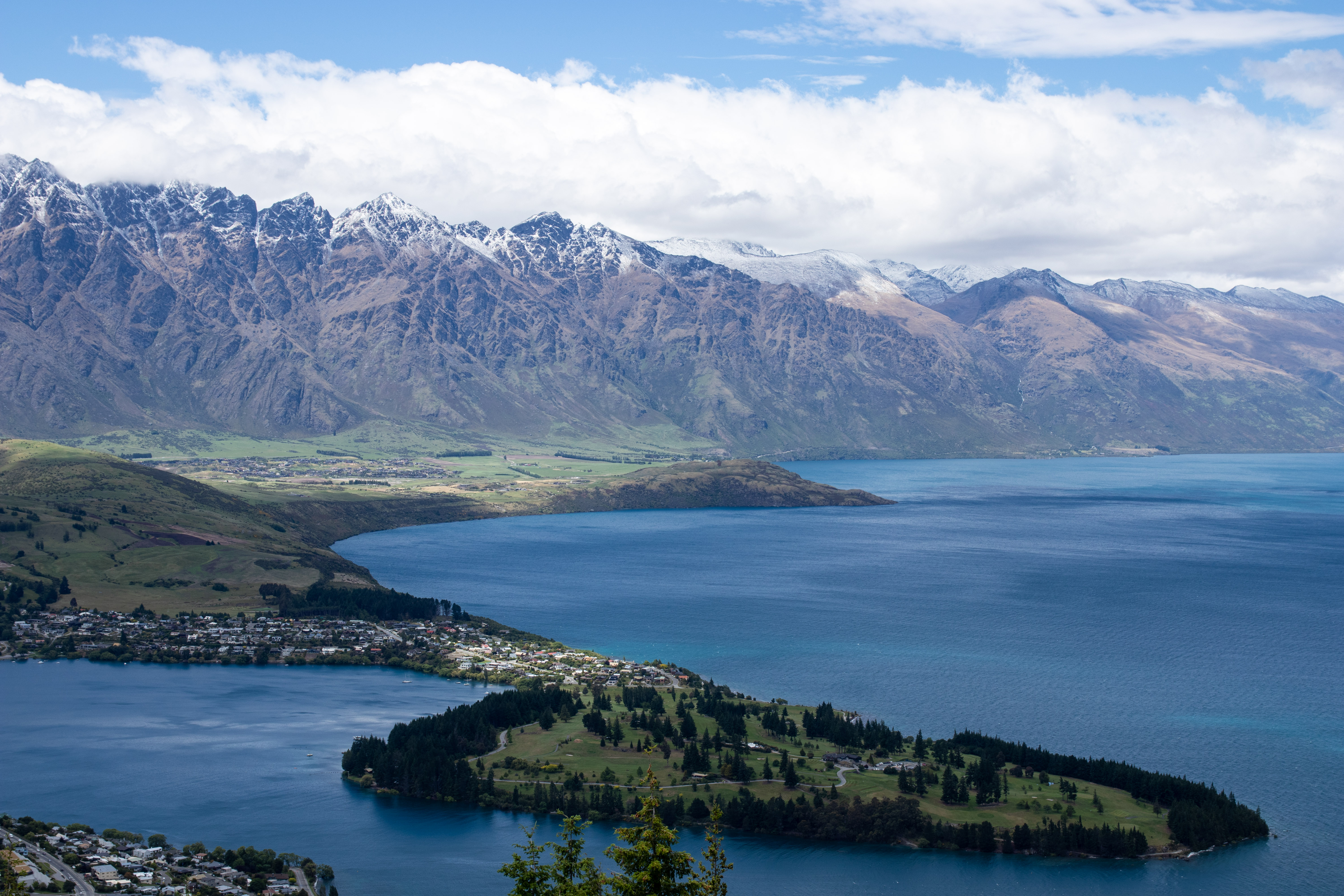
- View from Queenstown, with the Remarkables left of frame and Tapuae-o-Uenuku / Hector Mountains on the right.

Highest point
- Peak: Mount Tūwhakarōria
- Elevation: 2,307 m (7,569 ft)
- Coordinates: 45°10′03″S 168°50′54″E

Dimensions
- Length: 40 km (25 mi)

Naming
- Etymology: After Uenuku, a traditional atua of Ngāi Tahu, and after James Hector, New Zealand naturalist and scientist.
- Native name: Tāpuae O'Uenuku (Māori)

Geography
- Location within New Zealand
- Country: New Zealand
- Region: Otago
- Range coordinates: 45°17′35″S 168°48′47″E

Geology
- Formed by: Tectonic uplift / glaciation
- Rock type(s): Schist, Greywacke

The Hector Mountains (officially Tapuae-o-Uenuku / Hector Mountains) are a mountain range in the New Zealand region of Otago, near the resort town of Queenstown and just south of the more famous Remarkables mountain range. For most of its length, the mountains run adjacent to the southern reaches of Lake Wakatipu, before extending approximately 14 kilometres (8.7 mi) further south, past the glacial moraine at Kingston on the southern end of the lake. On their eastern side, the mountains mark the edge of the Nevis valley, a largely tussocked area which saw significant activity during the Otago gold rush of the 1860s. Historically, the mountains were an important mahinga kai (food gathering-place) for Ngāi Tahu and other local Māori iwi, who used the area to hunt for weka and gather tikumu while visiting the region.

Many of the peaks in the range remain unnamed, a group which – until 2013 – included its highest point. Following a joint process between Ngāi Tahu and the Central Otago District Council, four new names were added to the region in 2013, including the adoption of the range's current dual name. This included the name of Mount Tūwhakarōria for the highest point of the range, as well as Te Karearea Peak for another prominent point as seen from Cromwell and Lake Te Kōhua for the small lake between the two.

== Geology ==
As with the majority of mountain ranges in the South Island, the Hector Mountains are the largely the result of tectonic uplift. The majority of this uplift occurred during the Pliocene as a result of activity along the Nevis-Cardrona fault, which extends through the adjacent Nevis valley north to Cardrona. This uplift cut the Nevis River off from its original outflow as a tributary of the Mataura River, causing it to carve a new course north to the Kawarau River.

More recently, the western reaches of the mountains have been altered as a result of glaciation during the Last Glacial Maximum, at which point the valley of present-day Lake Wakatipu was occupied by a large glacier. Although a separate ice tongue from this glacier extended eastward from Queenstown towards nearby Arrowtown, the primary terminus of this glacier went as far south as Kingston, with the glacier's moraine forming the southern lake shore. This glacier eroded the western face of the Hector Mountains to a lesser extent than the Remarkables to the north, however the mountains still result in a sharp drop to the Lake below in places as a result – most famously along the route of State Highway 6. Following the glacier's retreat, this moraine was the original outflow of Lake Wakatipu until an alluvial fan from Lorn Peak in the Hector Mountains blocked this exit, again rerouting the water flow to the Kawerau system.

== Ecology ==
Owing to its relatively untouched environment and prominence in the local landscape, the Hector Mountains have a high conservation value. A study during the 1990s found over 500 species of vascular plant growing across the mountains, representing a greater than expected ratio of species to families found in the region. This includes a wide range of plants native to New Zealand, such as Celmisia, Hebes, and Tussocks – although there is disagreement as to whether the range of Hebe present are self-sustaining or sporadically introduced to exposed areas. Plant species are generally sparser in the more alpine portions of the range, with the higher northern portions of the range home to extensive fellfield ecosystems instead. These regions are still home to some plants, including the tikumu, however this is not to the same extent as lower reaches.

While a number of species of lizard endemic to New Zealand are either confirmed or believed to live on the Hector Mountains – including the Nevis, Cryptic, and McCann's skinks – birds the majority of native animal life on the range. The mountains are a breeding site for the southern black-backed gull, while birds of prey such as the kāhu and kārearea (the latter of which gives its name to Te Karearea Peak) are frequently seen. Kea and weka were historically common in the mountains, however their range has since been reduced due to predation by introduced pests. Evidence of habitation by moa (most likely the Upland moa) and other extinct species of birds has been found, however the extent to which the area was inhabited by such species is still unknown.

A variety of introduced species of mammal can also be found in the Hector Mountains, with detrimental affects on the traditional ecosystem including on the extent and variety of vegetation. In particular, low numbers of chamois are found across the range, as well as larger numbers of hares.

== Human interaction ==
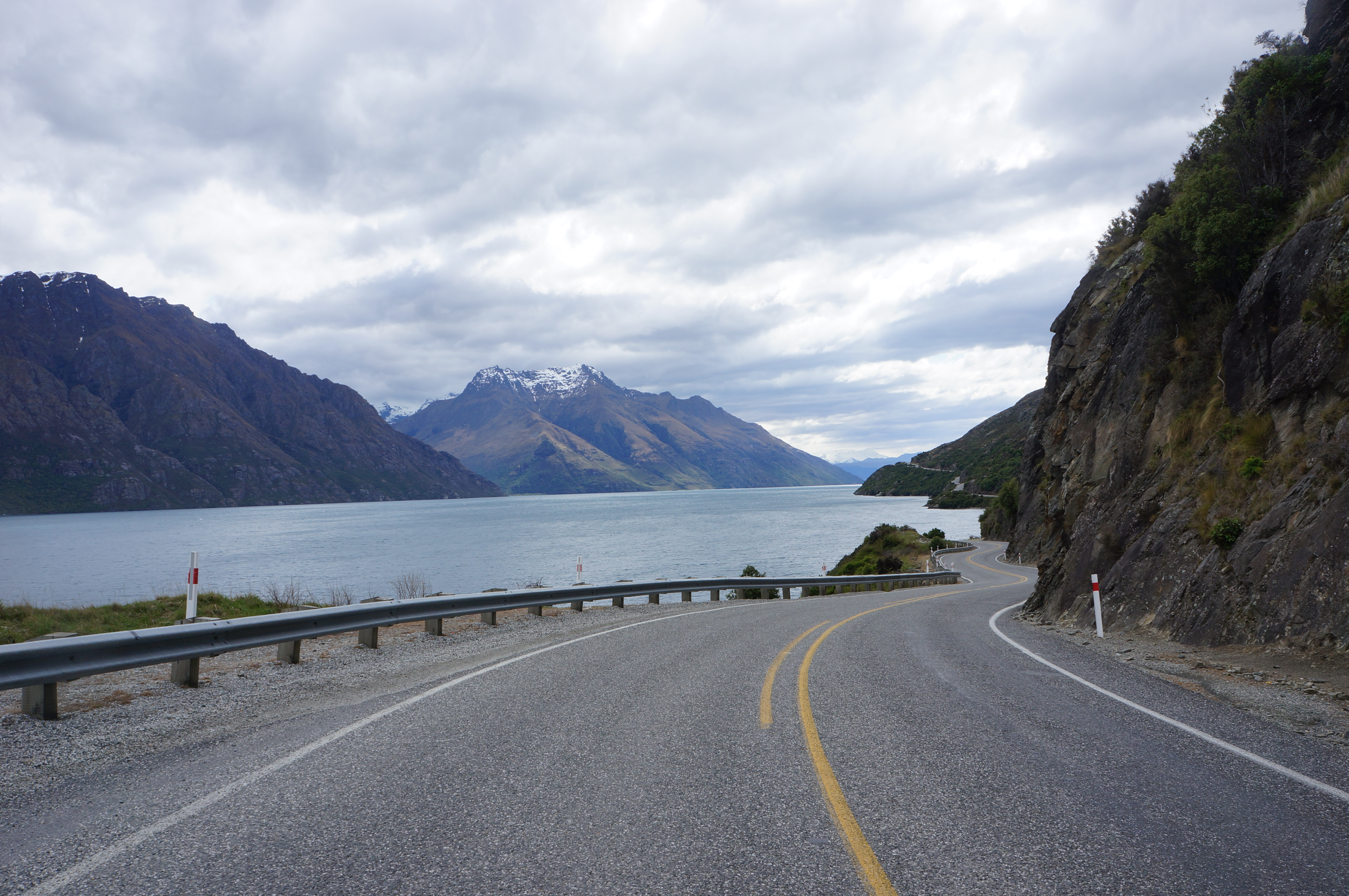
The "Devil's staircase", along the base of the mountain range

The Hector Mountains have a long history of human use, and had a significant role in the early Māori settlement of the region. The adjacent Nevis valley was part of an ara tawhito (traditional travel route) which connected Murihiku (modern-day Southland) with Central Otago and other regions further north. The placement of the range along this route saw the eastern foothills used as a nohoanga, or a seasonal occupation site used when Māori were passing through the area. This usage dates back to the 14th century to Waitaha habitation of the island, with evidence of "moa-hunter" huts near Schoolhouse creek in the eastern reaches of the Hector Mountains. Knowledge of the ara tawhito and use of the area for habitation continued through various iwi to inhabit the South Island, through to the present day Ngāi Tahu who arrived in the area as late as the 18th century. For all Māori who travelled through the Nevis, the range held importance as a mahinga kai (food gathering site), for its population of weka and various forms of edible vegetation. The food sources available on the mountains were able to sustain Māori on their way through the region, simplifying the journey through.

The foothills of the Hector Mountains were also significant to early Pākehā. The range was largely affected by the Otago gold rush of the 1860s, which saw miners flock to the Nevis in search of gold and a small town established in the foothills of the range. Sluicing sites are found along the eastern end of the range, many of which had the inadvertent impact of destroying archaeological evidence of earlier habitation. Some seventy years later, the southern reaches of the range were used by the New Zealand Alpine Club as an early site for skiing in the region. Following the discovery that the range allowed for skiing at a relatively low altitude, a hut was built and the area turned into a rudimentary ski field. Although a tow was eventually installed, the area did not develop further due to the Southland Ski Club relocating to establish a ski field at Coronet Peak in the 1950s due to its more reliable snow.

The Hector Mountains continue to be a waypoint for travellers passing through the region to this day. Unlike earlier travellers however, the main route past the range – State Highway 6 – now passes the western flank of the mountains. Known colloquially as the Devil's staircase, the route was built during the Great Depression and opened during 1936, and remains a popular lookout point.

== Name ==
The Māori name, Tapuae-o-Uenuku (also recorded as Tāpuae O'Uenuku) references Uenuku, an atua (the god of rainbows) and prominent ancestor for Ngāi Tahu. The range shares this name with Tapuae-o-Uenuku, the highest peak of the Kaikōura Ranges in the upper South Island, although it is unclear whether the two share a common etymology.

In the 19th century, Pākehā explorers named the range the Hector Mountains in honour of James Hector, a New Zealand naturalist and scientist at the time. In 2013, the range was given an official dual name, Tapuae-o-Uenuku / Hector Mountains, following a joint process between Ngāi Tahu and the Central Otago District Council, which also resulted in the naming of three previously-unnamed features of the range.
