= Crease Range =

Mountain range in Canada

- Location within British Columbia

Highest point
- Coordinates: 53°49′00″N 132°38′50″W

Geography
- Country: Canada
- Region: British Columbia
- Parent range: Queen Charlotte Mountains

The Crease Range is a small, low mountain range in northern western British Columbia, Canada, located on north-central Graham Island of Haida Gwaii, between Lan and Adam Lakes. It has an area of 79 km^{2} and consists of hills. It is a subrange of the Queen Charlotte Mountains which in turn form part of the Insular Mountains.
