= Sierra de Chinajá =

Mountain range in Guatemala

- Location within Guatemala

Highest point
- Elevation: 838 m (2,749 ft)
- Coordinates: 15.973129°N 90.210114°W

Dimensions
- Length: 20 km (12 mi) northwest to southeast
- Width: 4 km (2.5 mi)
- Area: 135 km^{2} (52 mi^{2})

Geography
- Country: Guatemala
- Department: Alta Verapaz
- Municipality: Chisec

Geology
- Rock age: Mesozoic (Cretaceous)
- Rock type: Karstic

The Sierra de Chinajá is a low karstic mountain range in Guatemala. It is situated in the north of the department of Alta Verapaz and covers an area of approximately 135 km^{2} (52 sq mi).<-- 2023-02-27: Google search of the title did not provide any hits of the PDF --> Its highest peak has an altitude of 838 m (2,749 ft).

The mountain range is isolated from other ranges and forms the last major topographic landform between the highlands of the Sierra de Chamá and the lowland plains of Petén.

== See also ==
- Geography of Guatemala
