= The Remarkables =

Mountain range in New Zealand

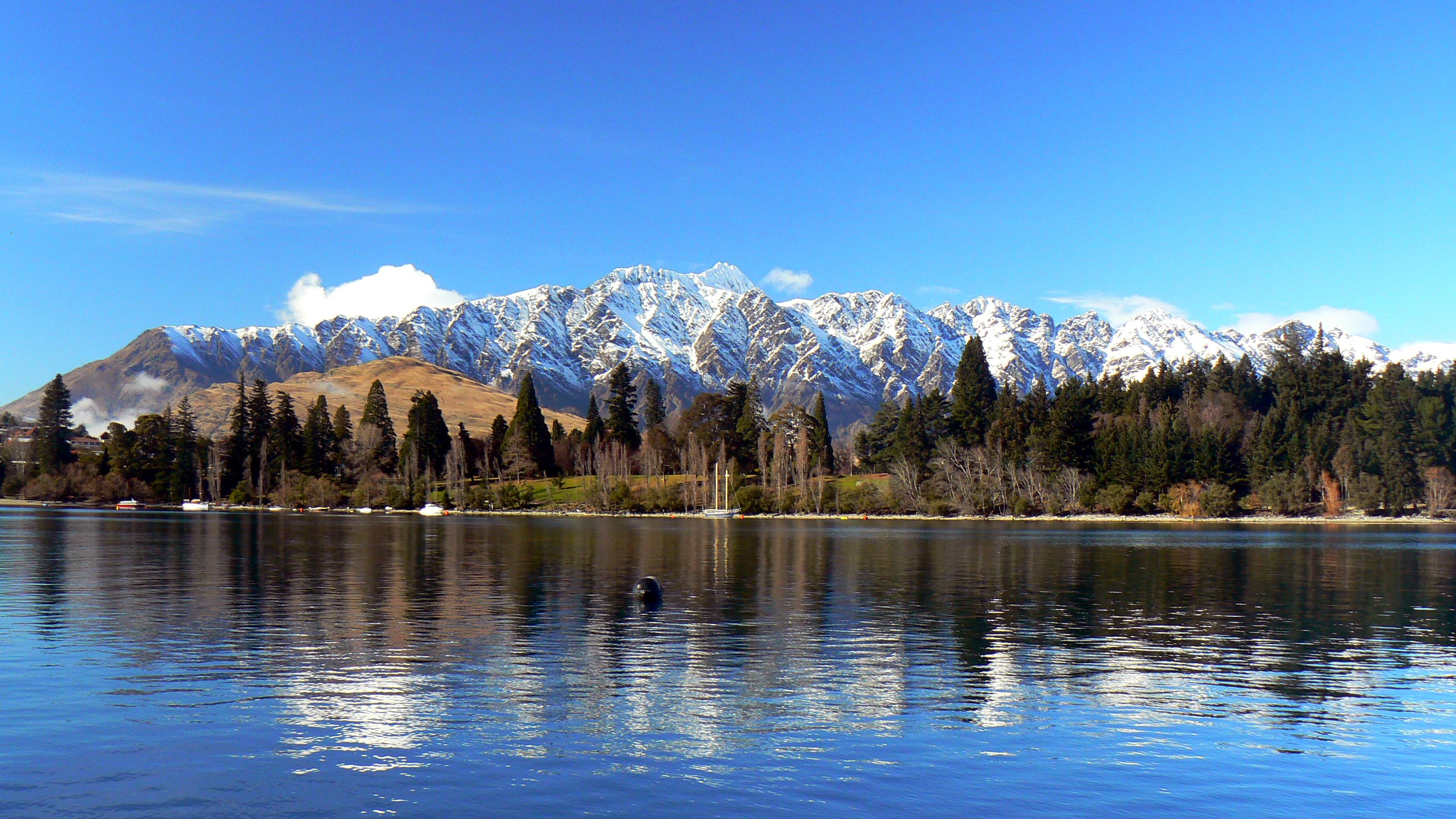
- The Remarkables and Lake Wakatipu from Queenstown.

Highest point
- Peak: Double Cone
- Elevation: 2,319 m (7,608 ft)
- Coordinates: 45°04′19″S 168°48′29″E

Dimensions
- Length: 40 km (25 mi)

Naming
- Etymology: Named for the serrated peaks of the range.
- Native name: Kawarau (Māori)

Geography
- Location within New Zealand
- Country: New Zealand
- Region: Otago
- Range coordinates: 45°09′S 168°50′E

Geology
- Formed by: Tectonic uplift / glaciation
- Rock type(s): Schist, Greywacke

The Remarkables (Māori: Kawarau) are a mountain range and part of the Remarkables Conservation Area that includes Kawarau/The Remarkables and Tāpuae O’Uenuku/Hector Mountains and Te Papapuni/Nevis River valley. Located on the southeastern shore of Lake Wakatipu, Otago in the South Island of New Zealand, the range lives up to its name by rising sharply to create a remarkable backdrop. The range is clearly visible from the nearby town of Queenstown.

The highest point in the range is Single Cone (2319 metres). The adjacent Tapuae-o-Uenuku / Hector Mountains southeast of the Remarkables culminate in Mount Tūwhakarōria (2307 m).

The area contains a number of beautiful features, such as Lake Alta, a small lake nestled within a natural amphitheatre at the head of a glacial valley (a ‘cirque’) and below the towering Double Cone peaks. There are a number of high altitude walks in the Remarkables Conservation Area including Lake Alta which can be accessed from the Remarkables Skifield.

== Name ==
The original Ngāi Tahu inhabitants called the mountains Kawarau, and gave the same name to the Kawarau River which starts beneath them.

The mountains were named The Remarkables by Alexander Garvie in 1857–58 because of the serrated peaks of the range. The range was earlier known as the Crosscuts for the same reason.

== The Remarkables Ski Area ==
During the winter months, the Remarkables Ski Area has skiing and other winter activities. The ski area is situated over three mountain bowls covering 220 ha (540 acres) with eight lifts (4 chairlifts, 4 magic carpets). Terrain is rated as 30% beginners, 40% intermediate and 30% advanced. Average annual snowfall is 3.67 metres.

NZSki Limited operates The Remarkables Ski Area under agreements with the New Zealand government, primarily involving the Department of Conservation (DOC). The ski area is situated within the Rastus Burn Recreation Reserve, a conservation area managed by DOC.

In 2023, NZSki submitted an application for a new 40-year concession. This application sought permissions encompassing a lease, license, and easement to manage and control all activities related to the ownership, operation, repair, and maintenance of The Remarkables ski area. The proposal included plans for extending the base building and maintenance facilities, as well as installing three additional snow fences. Public submissions on this application closed on May 3, 2023, and a virtual hearing was held on May 24, 2023.

Additionally, NZSki has expressed intentions to expand the ski area into the adjacent Doolans Basin, which would significantly increase the skiable terrain. This proposed expansion would require a new concession, as the Doolans Basin is part of the larger Remarkables Conservation Area. The expansion plan includes constructing new chairlifts or gondolas, developing ski trails, and establishing necessary infrastructure such as snowmaking facilities and visitor amenities.

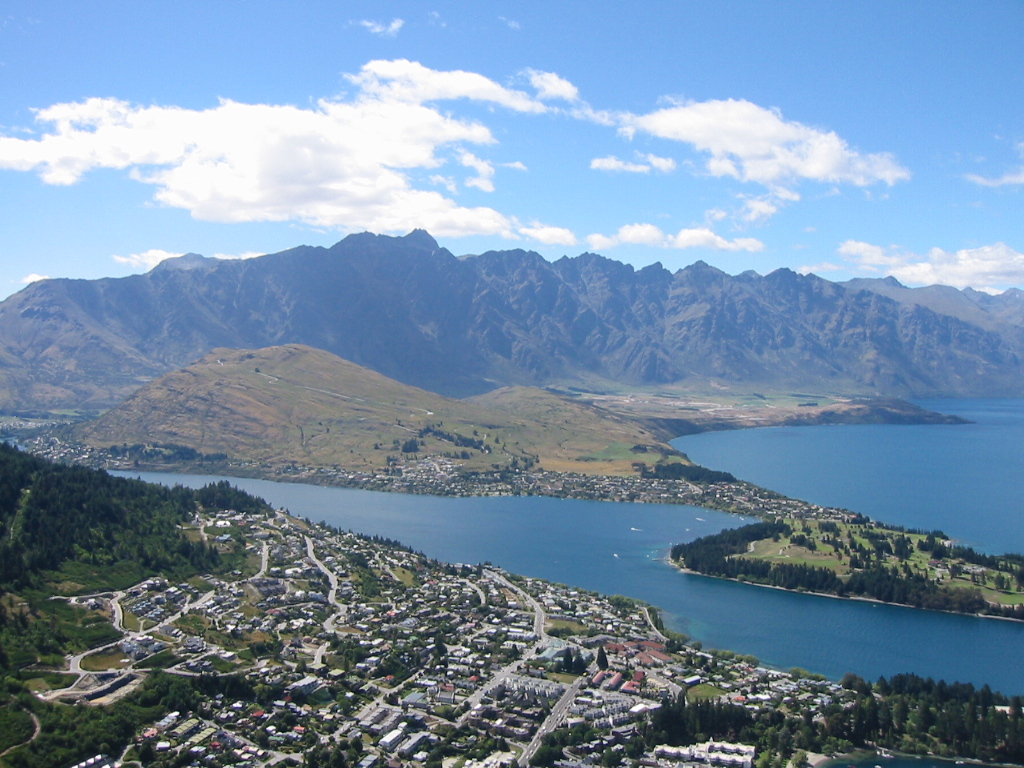
View from the top of the gondola into Queenstown, with Remarkables behind.

The Remarkables Skifields
Elevation	1943 metres
Vertical	357 metres
Skiable Area	220 hectares
Lifts	4 chairlifts (2 detachable 6 seater, 2 quad), 4 surface conveyor lifts, Highest lifted point: 1943 metres Lowest lift: 1622 metres
Lift Operation	9.00 am - 4.00 pm
Terrain	30% Beginner, 40% Intermediate, 30% Advanced
Standard Season	10 June – 1 October
Average Snowfall	3.67 metres per year (excluding snowmaking)
Snowmaking	Terrain park, beginners' area, Alta Green, Casterway, Gotham City and Turquoise novice trails and Ozone Tubing Park
Nearest Town	Queenstown (28 km/45 minutes)

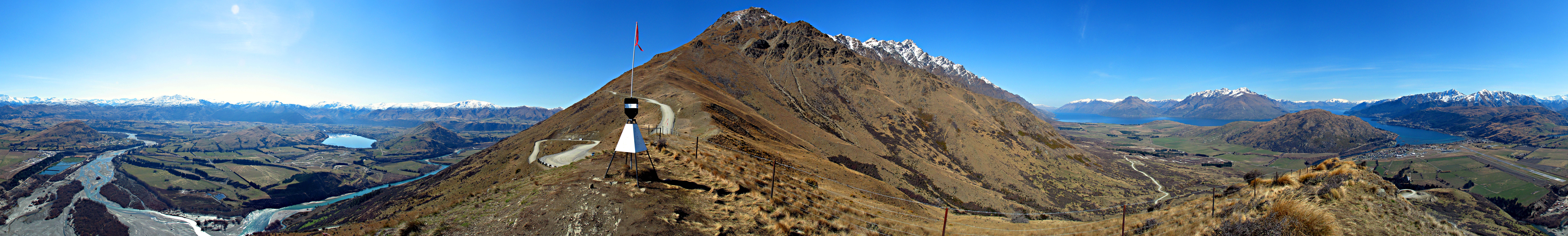
Panorama of the Remarkables and surroundings from their northern end.

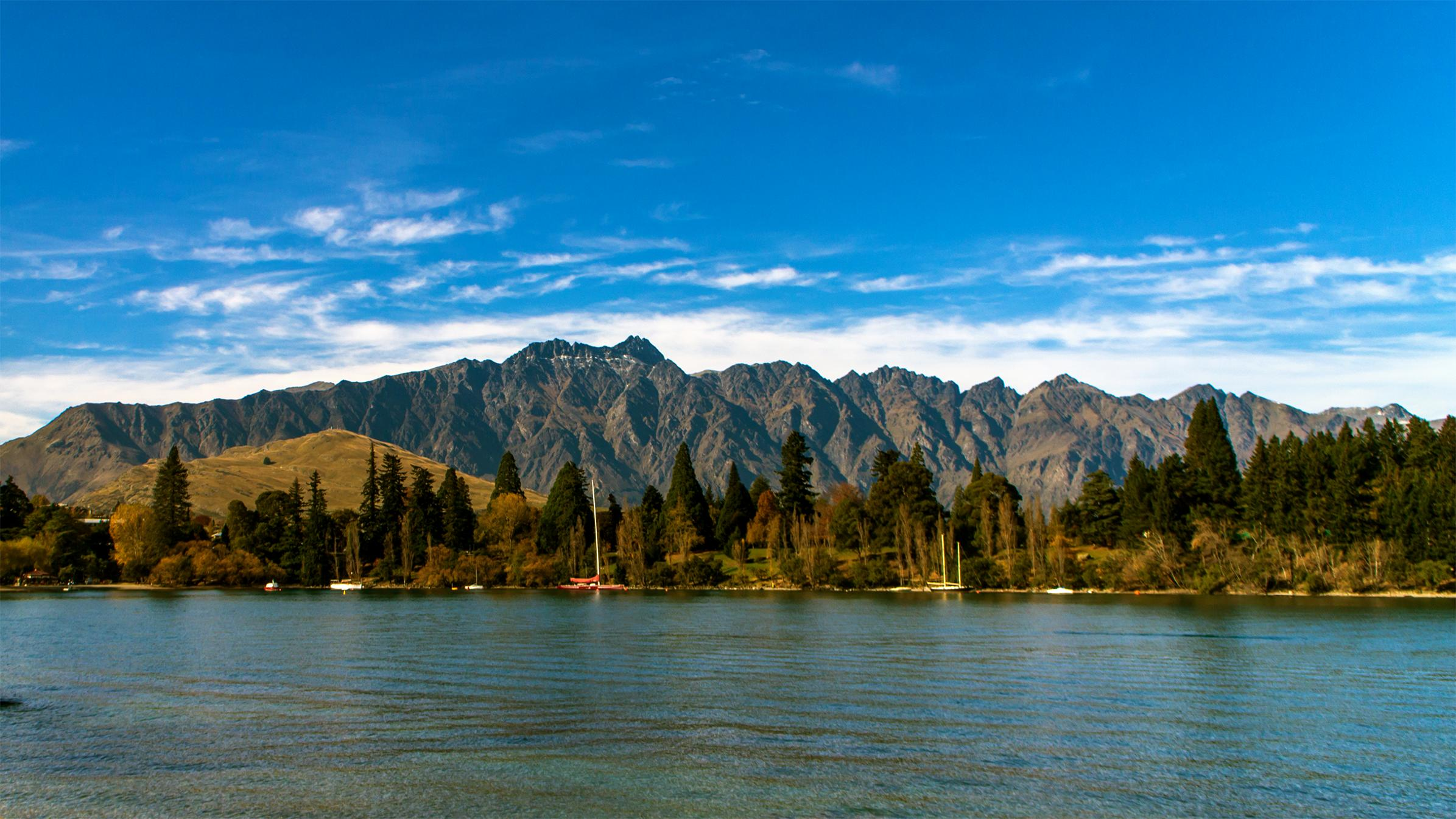
The Remarkables mountain range, autumn 2015

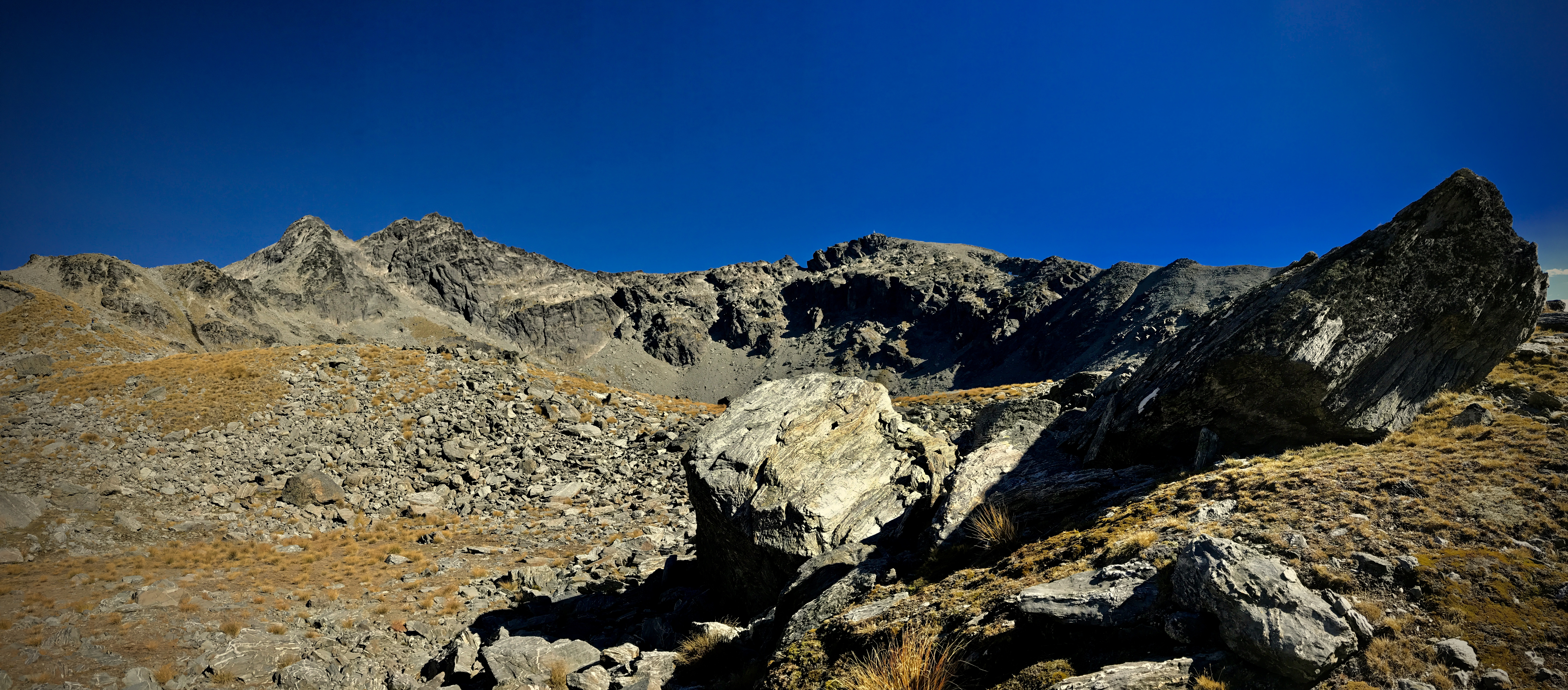
This is the view toward Double Cone peak at The Remarkables when hiking towards Lake Alta, the glacier lake.

A panorama of The Remarkables, with the sun shadow demonstrating its near-perfect North-South orientation.
