= Queen Charlotte Mountains =

Mountain range in British Columbia, Canada

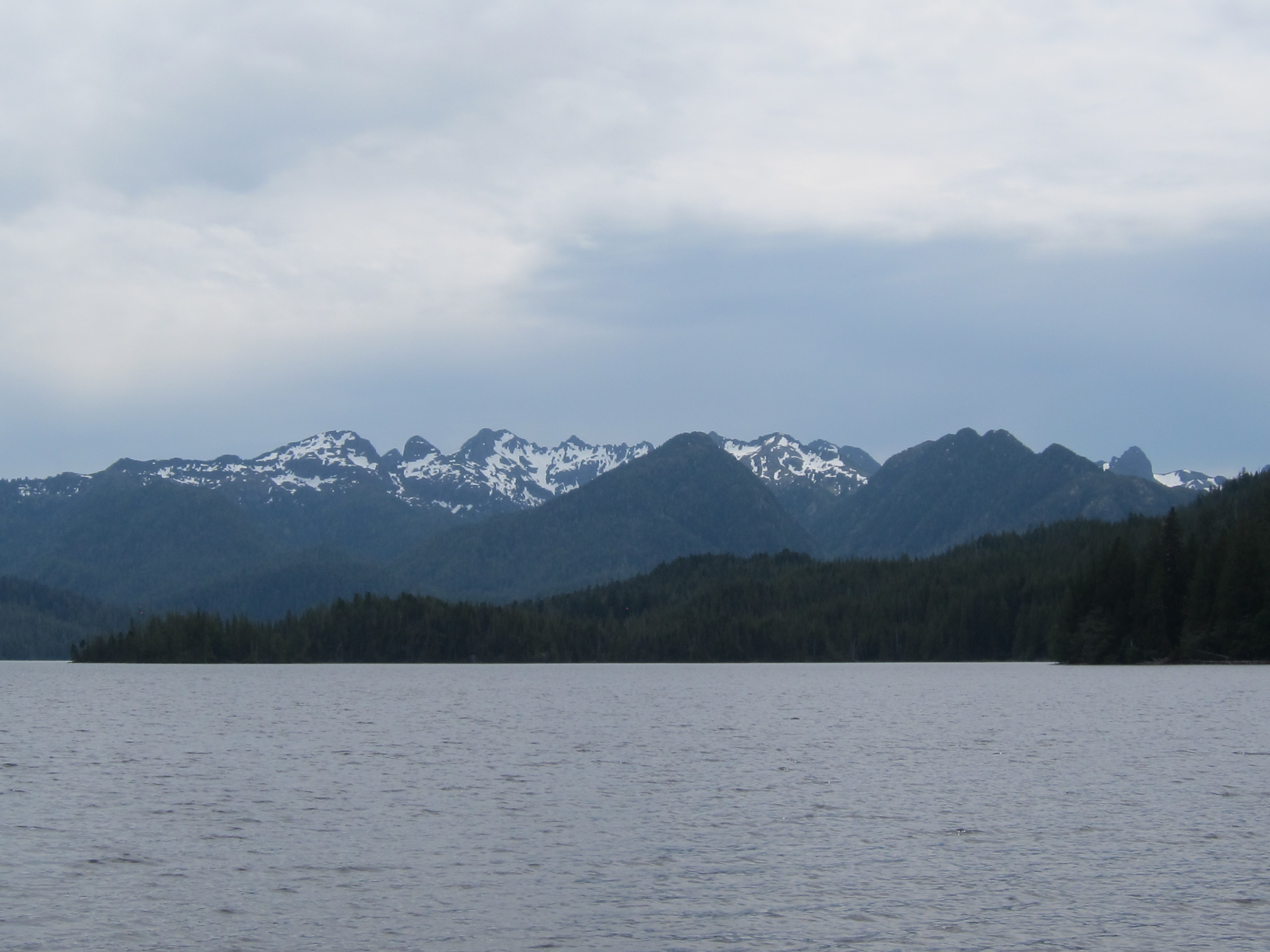
- Yakoun Lake and the Queen Charlotte Range

Highest point
- Peak: Mount Moresby
- Elevation: 1,164 m (3,819 ft)
- Coordinates: 53°01′09.1″N 132°05′08.2″W

Geography
- Location within British Columbia
- Country: Canada
- Province: British Columbia
- Parent range: Insular Mountains

The Queen Charlotte Mountains are a mountain range comprising all mountains and small mountain ranges of Haida Gwaii, British Columbia, Canada. It is the northernmost subrange of the Insular Mountains. They are subdivided into the Queen Charlotte Ranges, which comprise a small part of southwestern Graham Island and most of Moresby Island, and the Skidegate Plateau, which runs NW-SE on central Graham Island and includes the northeastern tip of Moresby Island. To the plateau's northeast is the Queen Charlotte Lowland, which is part of the Hecate Depression and includes the Argonaut Plain.

Mount Moresby is the highest mountain associated with the Queen Charlotte Mountains, at 1,164 m (3,819 ft).

== Sub-ranges ==
- Cameron Range: On the western side of Graham Island
- Crease Range: On north-central Graham Island
- McKay Range: On the south coast of Graham Island
- San Christoval Range: On the western side of Moresby Island

== See also ==
- Vancouver Island Ranges
- Insular Mountains
