= McKay Range =

Mountain range in Canada

- Location within British Columbia

Highest point
- Coordinates: 53°44′00″N 132°30′00″W

Geography
- Country: Canada
- Region: British Columbia
- Parent range: Queen Charlotte Mountains

The McKay Range is a small, low mountain range in northwestern British Columbia, Canada, located on the southern coast of Graham Island in the Haida Gwaii. It has an area of 60 km^{2} and consists of hills. It is a subrange of the Queen Charlotte Mountains which in turn form part of the Insular Mountains.
