= Alángup Qáqai =

Mountain range in Disko Island, Greenland

Coordinates: 69°24′N 54°00′W

Alángup Qáqai is a mountain range located in southwestern Disko Island, in West Greenland. Administratively this range is part of Qeqertalik Municipality.
