= Centauri Montes =

Montes on Mars

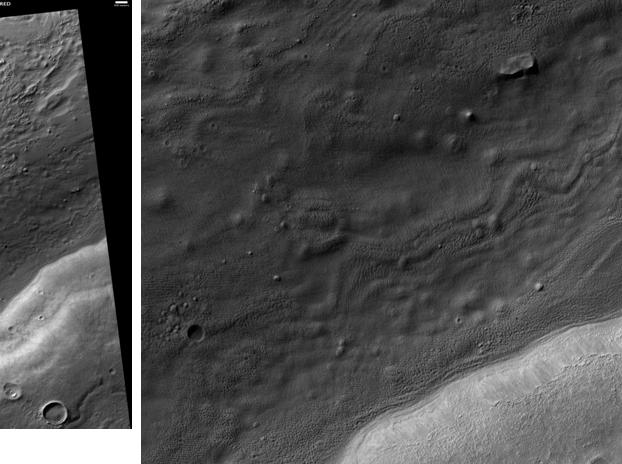
- Centauri Montes, as seen by HiRISE. Scale bar is 500 meters long. The original enlargement of the image at the left is full of rich detail on all parts of the picture

Highest point
- Elevation: 1,400 m (4,600 ft)

Dimensions
- Length: 270 km (170 mi)

Geography
- Region: Hellas quadrangle

Centauri Montes is a group of mountains in the Hellas quadrangle of Mars, located at 38.67°S 95.52°E. It is 270 km across and was named after the albedo feature Centauri Lacus. According to NASA, there are light-sediment gulley deposits that have formed in a crater around the Centauri Montes.
