= Tigbao, Zamboanga del Sur =

Municipality in Zamboanga del Sur, Philippines

Tigbao
- Municipality
- Municipality of Tigbao
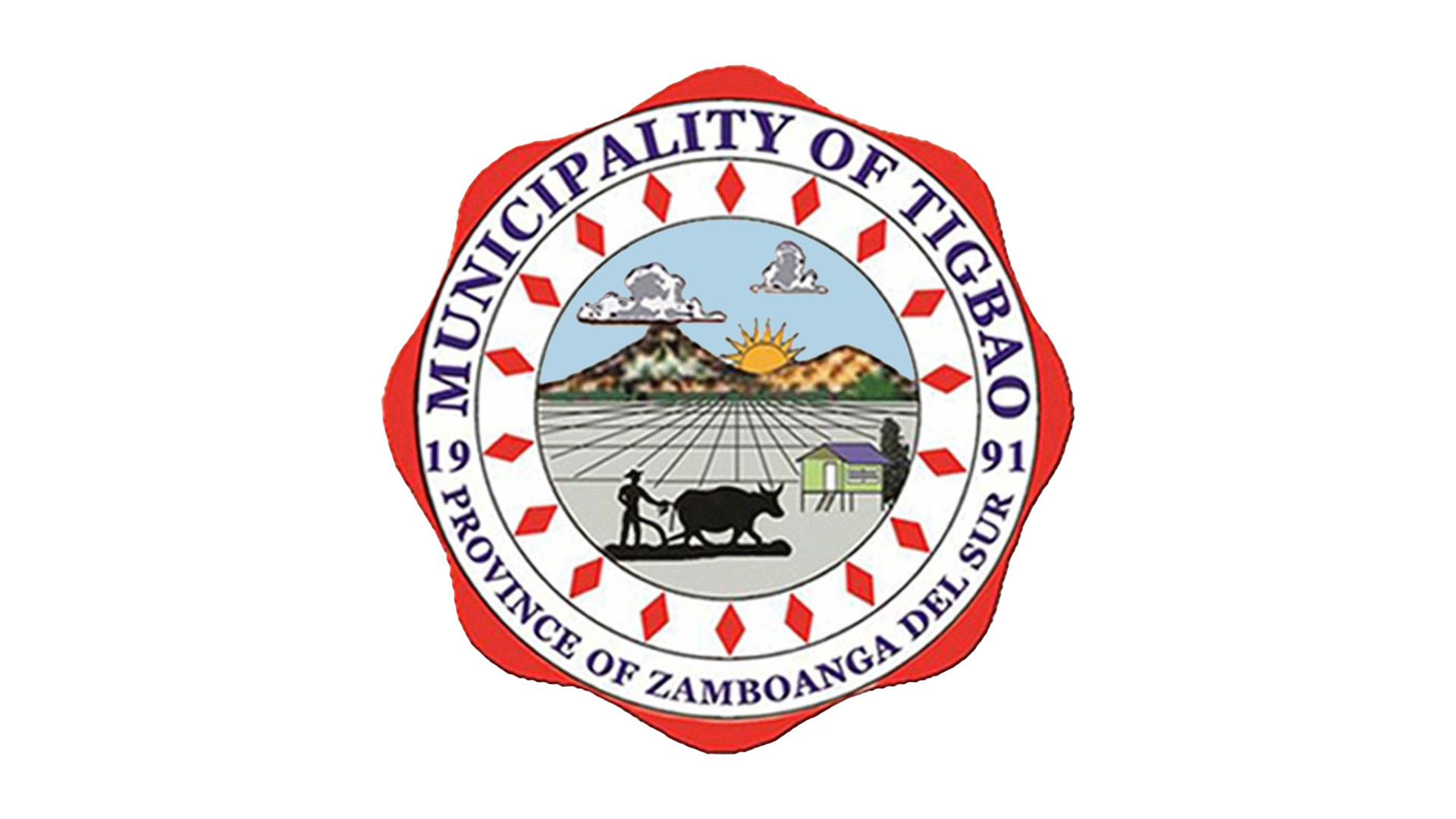
- Flag Seal
- Motto: "Usbaw Tigbao"
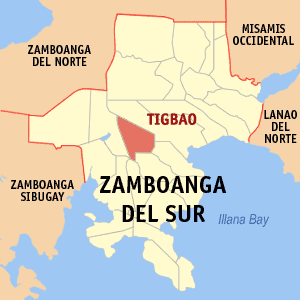
- Map of Zamboanga del Sur with Tigbao highlighted
- Interactive map of Tigbao
- Location within the Philippines
- Coordinates: 7°49′16″N 123°13′24″E
- Country: Philippines
- Region: Zamboanga Peninsula
- Province: Zamboanga del Sur
- District: 2nd district
- Founded: November 8, 1991
- Barangays: 18 (see Barangays)

Government
  - Type: Sangguniang Bayan
  - Mayor: Eleazar C. Carcallas
  - Vice Mayor: Rowell P. Lalican
  - Representative: Jeyzel Victoria C. Yu
  - Municipal Council: Members: Domel N. Allego; Socrates S. Carreon Sr.; Erlinda G. Miral; Rolando B. Cañales; Armando B. Bucog; Saturnino R. Jamisola Jr.; Edgardo P. Tabay II; Rolly G. Maraasin; Philip Giovani D.Camilo-SK Fed Pres.; Jaime Ulo-Liga President; Jose Macarial-Municipal IPMR
  - Electorate: 14,002 voters (2025)

Area
  - Total: 120.69 km^{2} (46.60 sq mi)
- Elevation: 419 m (1,375 ft)
- Highest elevation: 1,144 m (3,753 ft)
- Lowest elevation: 90 m (300 ft)

Population (2024 census)
  - Total: 19,716
  - Density: 163.36/km^{2} (423.10/sq mi)
  - Households: 4,769

Economy
  - Income class: 4th municipal income class
  - Poverty incidence: 42.94% (2023)
  - Revenue: ₱ 140.1 million (2024)
  - Assets: ₱ 477.4 million (2024)
  - Expenditure: ₱ 45.93 million (2024)
  - Liabilities: ₱ 123.3 million (2024)

Service provider
  - Electricity: Zamboanga del Sur 1 Electric Cooperative (ZAMSURECO 1)
- Time zone: UTC+8 (PST)
- ZIP code: 7043
- PSGC: 0907344000
- IDD : area code: +63 (0)62
- Native languages: Subanon; Cebuano; Chavacano; Tagalog
- Website: www.zds-tigbao.gov.ph

Tigbao, officially the Municipality of Tigbao (Cebuano: Lungsod sa Tigbao; Subanen: Benwa Tigbao; Chavacano: Municipalidad de Tigbao; Tagalog: Bayan ng Tigbao), is a municipality in the province of Zamboanga del Sur, Philippines. According to the 2024 census, it has a population of 19,716 people.

It was created by virtue of Republic Act No. 7162 on November 8, 1991. Tigbao was former part of Municipality of Dumalinao.

Mount Timolan, the highest peak in Zamboanga del Sur, overlooks the town. The name of the town was derived from the abundance of "Tigbao" Grasses in the area.

== Geography ==
=== Barangays ===
Tigbao is politically subdivided into 18 barangays. Each barangay consists of puroks while some have sitios.

- Begong
- Busol
- Caluma
- Diana Countryside
- Guinlin
- Lacarayan
- Lacupayan
- Libayoy
- Limas
- Longmot
- Maragang
- Mati
- Nangan-nangan
- New Tuburan
- Nilo
- Tigbao
- Timolan
- Upper Nilo

=== Climate ===
Climate data for Tigbao, Zamboanga del Sur
Month	Jan	Feb	Mar	Apr	May	Jun	Jul	Aug	Sep	Oct	Nov	Dec	Year
Mean daily maximum °C (°F)	29 (84)	29 (84)	30 (86)	30 (86)	28 (82)	27 (81)	27 (81)	26 (79)	27 (81)	27 (81)	28 (82)	28 (82)	28 (82)
Mean daily minimum °C (°F)	19 (66)	19 (66)	20 (68)	21 (70)	22 (72)	22 (72)	21 (70)	21 (70)	21 (70)	21 (70)	21 (70)	20 (68)	21 (69)
Average precipitation mm (inches)	22 (0.9)	18 (0.7)	23 (0.9)	24 (0.9)	67 (2.6)	120 (4.7)	132 (5.2)	156 (6.1)	119 (4.7)	124 (4.9)	54 (2.1)	24 (0.9)	883 (34.6)
Average rainy days	9.4	9.1	11.5	11.9	20.1	22.5	22.4	23.2	21.5	22.2	15.7	11.5	201
Source: Meteoblue

== Demographics ==
Population census of Tigbao
Year	Pop.	±% p.a.
1995	15,915	—
2000	16,914	+1.31%
2007	18,598	+1.32%
2010	19,300	+1.36%
2015	20,979	+1.60%
2020	21,675	+0.69%
2024	19,716	−2.25%
Source: Philippine Statistics Authority

== Economy ==
Poverty incidence of Tigbao (%)

Source: Philippine Statistics Authority
