= Brabazon Range =

Mountain range in Alaska, United States

- Location within Alaska

Highest point
- Elevation: 1,481 m (4,859 ft)
- Coordinates: 59°23′14″N 138°31′18″W

Dimensions
- Length: 28 mi (45 km)

Geography
- Countries: United States and Canada
- State: Alaska
- Parent range: Saint Elias Mountains

The Brabazon Range is a mountain range located in the U.S. state of Alaska in Saint Elias Mountains in Tongass National Forest. The Brabazon Range stretches for about 28 miles from Alsek River at Gateway Knob to Harlequin Lake, located 44 miles southeast of Yakutat in south central Alaska. It is situated to the southeast of Mount Reaburn (1684 m) and northeast of Square Lake Cabin and north of Bear Island.

The name for the mountain ranger was first proposed by then University of Wisconsin geologist, Eliot Blackwelder. It is named after A. J. Brabazon, who created the first topographic map of the ranger in 1895.
