= San Christoval Range =

Mountain range in Canada

- Location within British Columbia

Highest point
- Coordinates: 52°37′00″N 131°50′00″W

Geography
- Country: Canada
- Region: British Columbia
- Parent range: Queen Charlotte Mountains

The San Christoval Range is a 50 km long, jagged mountain range located on the west coast of Moresby Island, British Columbia, Canada. It is the only lineal mountain range in the Haida Gwaii and the highest peaks are just above 1000 m. The mountain range was named by Juan José Pérez Hernández in 1774.
