= Balana =

Balana Sinhala: බළන
- Village
- Location in Sri Lanka
- Coordinates: 7.2722°N 80.4882°E
- Country: Sri Lanka
- Province: Central Province
- District: Kandy
- Elevation: 515 m (1,690 ft)

Population (2015)
  - Total: 487
- Time zone: UTC+5:30 (Sri Lanka Standard Time)
- Postal code: 20308

Balana (Sinhala: බළන) is a village in Sri Lanka. It is located within the Kandy District, Central Province.

It is situated in Alagalla Mountain Range near the boundaries of the Central and Sabaragamuwa Provinces. The Alagalla mountains served as a natural defence location for nearly five centuries. It is the site of the Balana fort, a strategic rock fortress and an outpost to Kandyan kingdom, built between the Kadugannawa Pass and the Alagalla Mountain Range.

It is located 20 km (12 mi) west of Kandy, 20 km (12 mi) north-west of Gampola and 110 km (68 mi) from Colombo. It is serviced by the Balana railway station, which is on the Main line.

== See also ==
- List of towns in Central Province, Sri Lanka
