= Dawson Tower =

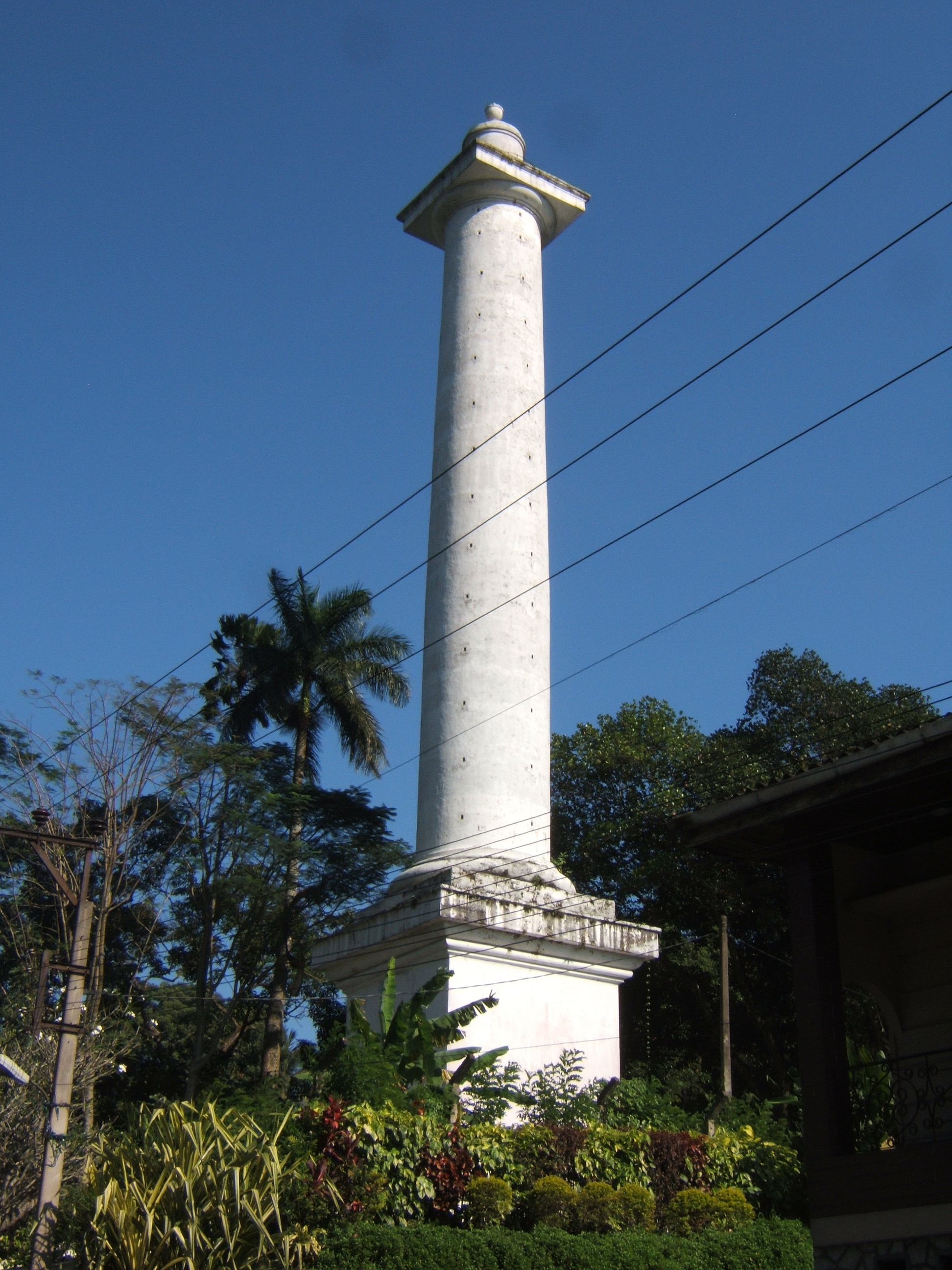
- Dawson Tower as of January 2013

- Location within Sri Lanka

General information
- Status: Preserved
- Architectural style: Monument
- Location: Kadugannawa, Sri Lanka
- Coordinates: 7.2566°N 80.517°E
- Completed: 1832

Archaeological Protected Monument of Sri Lanka
- Designated: 6 July 2007

Dawson Tower (Sinhala: ඩෝසන් කුළුණ, romanized: Dosan Kuluna), is located on Kadugannawa in the Kadugannawa Pass next to the Colombo - Kandy Road, the first modern highway in the island. Work began on the Colombo - Kandy Road in 1820 under the direction of Captain William Francis Dawson who died during the project. The Dawson Tower was erected in memory of Dawson.

== History ==
Under the direction of Governor Edward Barnes, Captain William Francis Dawson initiated the construction of the Colombo-Kandy road project in 1820. He died on 28 March 1829, before the completion of the construction work. It is said that he had been bitten by a venomous snake. Dawson Tower was erected in 1832 as a posthumous memorial to Dawson's exemplary service to the country.

The tower location was selected as it was a few meters away from the Kadugannawa pass which stands witness to Dawson's technical expertise and engineering skills.

== Images ==
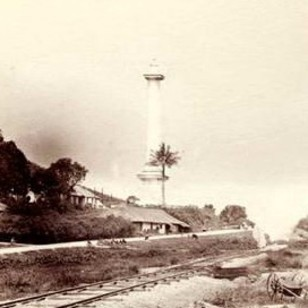
Captain Dawson Tower Kadugannawa. Date Range c.1860-c.1880

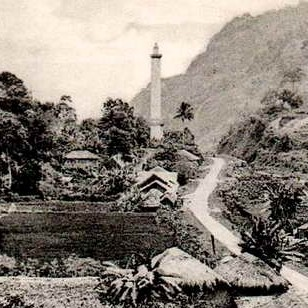
Captain Dawson Tower Kadugannawa-Early 1900s

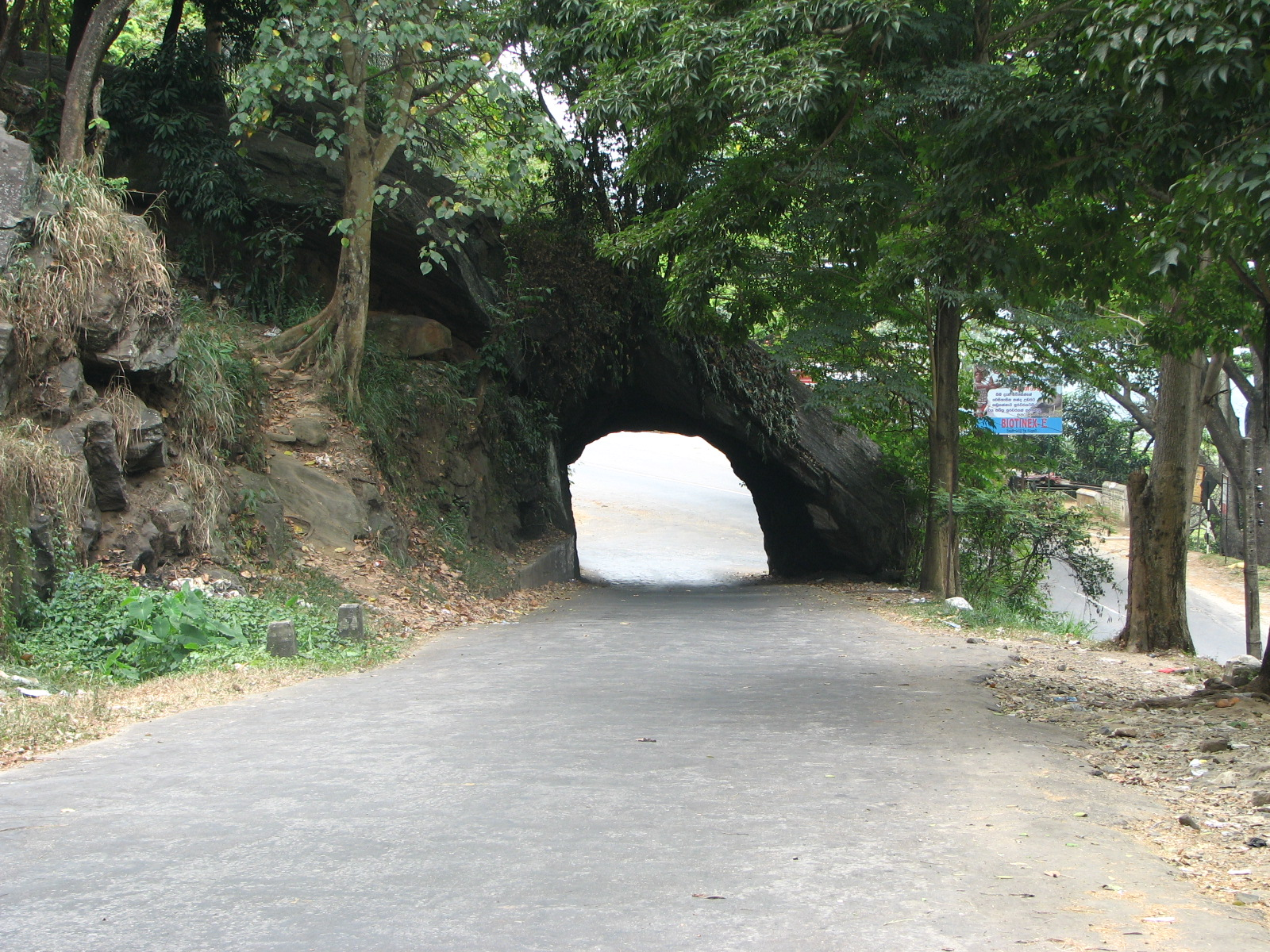
Kadugannawa Pass from top as of February 2007.

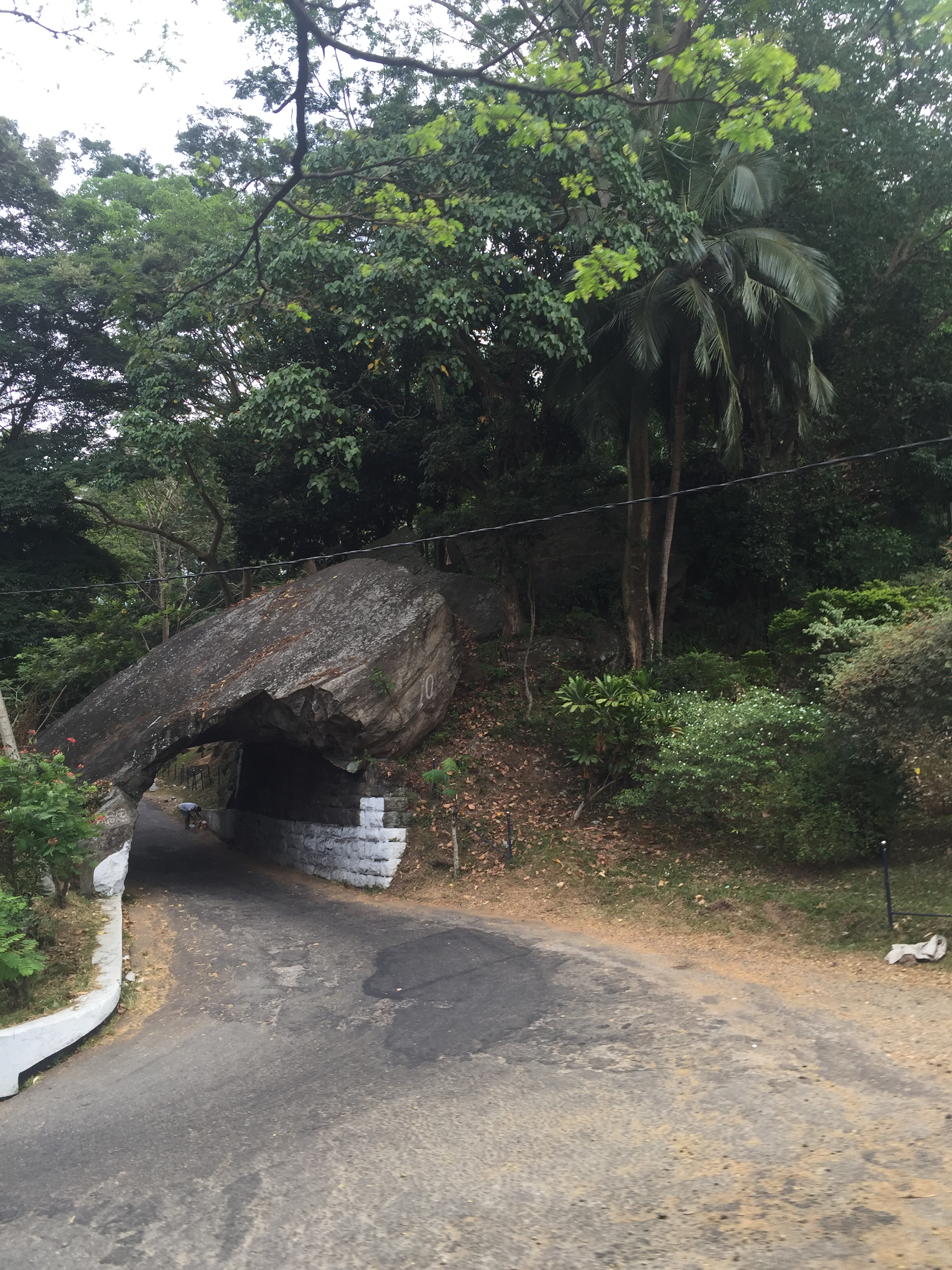
Kadugannawa Pass from bottom as of February 2016.

== See also ==
- Kadugannawa Ambalama
- National railway museum, Kadugannawa
