= Alagalla Mountain Range =

Mountain range in Sri Lanka

- Tuber Rock Mountain Range
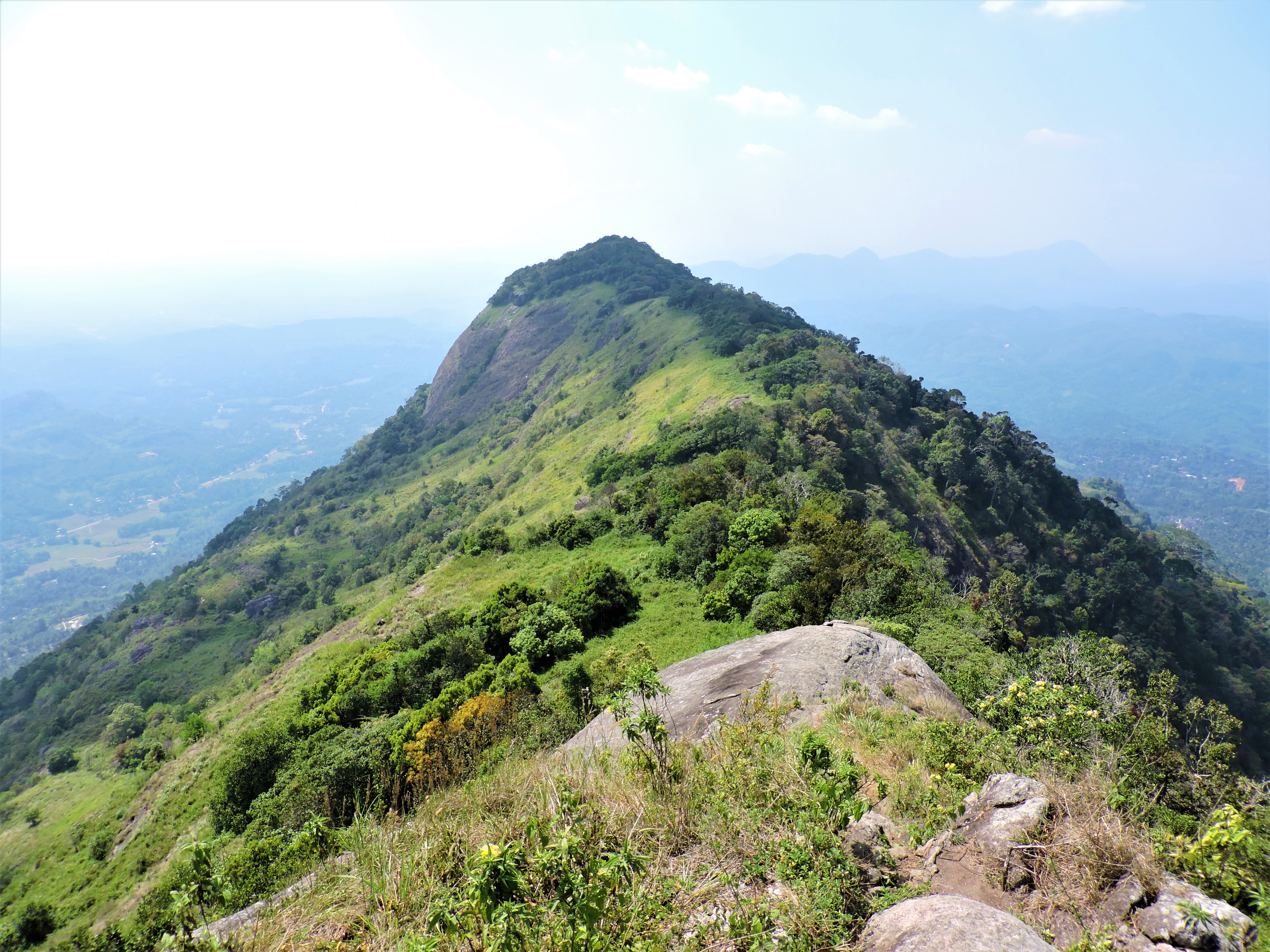

Highest point
- Elevation: 1,140 m (3,740 ft)
- Coordinates: 7°15′12″N 80°26′47″E

Geography
- Location within Sri Lanka
- Location: Sri Lanka

Alagalla (Sinhala: අලගල්ල, literal translation: Tuber rock) Mountain Range is situated at the boundaries of the Central and Sabaragamuwa Provinces in Sri Lanka. Along with the surrounding Bathalegala (බතලේගල) also known as Bible Rock, Uthuwankanda (උතුවන්කන්ද), Devanagala (දෙවනගල), Ambuluwawa (අම්බුළුවාව), Knuckles Mountain Range and Hanthana (හන්තාන) Mountain Range, Alagalla mountain has served as a natural defense location for nearly five centuries (1505–1948) against the Portuguese, Dutch and English invasions aimed at the Kandyan Kingdom.

== Historical importance ==
Most of the battles to invade the Kandyan Kingdom took place at Balana (literal translation viewing point), with the Kandyan monarchs emerging victorious aided by the impenetrable mountain formations. The famous Balana Fort which functioned as a strategic rock fortress and an outpost to Kandyan kingdom was built between Kadugannawa Pass and Alagalla Mountain Range.

== Meangalla Pass and Meeyangala tunnel ==
The railway lines to upcountry were established by the English once the Kandyan Kingdom was absorbed into the British Empire in 1815. However, extending the already working Colombo-Ambepussa (අඹේපුස්ස) mainline across the Alagalla mountain to Kandy proved to be extremely challenging as it had to be navigated around a waterfall, Meeyan Ella (මීයන් ඇල්ල) about 100 ft (30 m) high falling directly on the planned route and across a steeply inclined solid rock of more than 1,000 ft (300 m) thick.

Initially, the railway track was constructed by gouging artificial grooves on the rock at the top of the waterfall to "split" the waterfall into two and fall away from the rail route. The tracks were then set up around the inclined rock and this was called the Meangalla (මීන්ගල්ල) pass. However, this railway route was found to be dangerous, especially in the rainy season as heavy rains caused the swollen waterfall and slip rocks to damage the trains and the rail tracks.

This resulted in a more robust and safe rerouting via drilling through the solid rock. The Meeyangalla (මීයන්ගල්ල) tunnel, thus constructed and numbered as tunnel 5A, became the sixth tunnel in the Colombo-Kandy railway line and also the second-longest railway tunnel in Sri Lanka at 423 m (1,388 ft) long.

== Hiking through the Alagalla Mountains ==
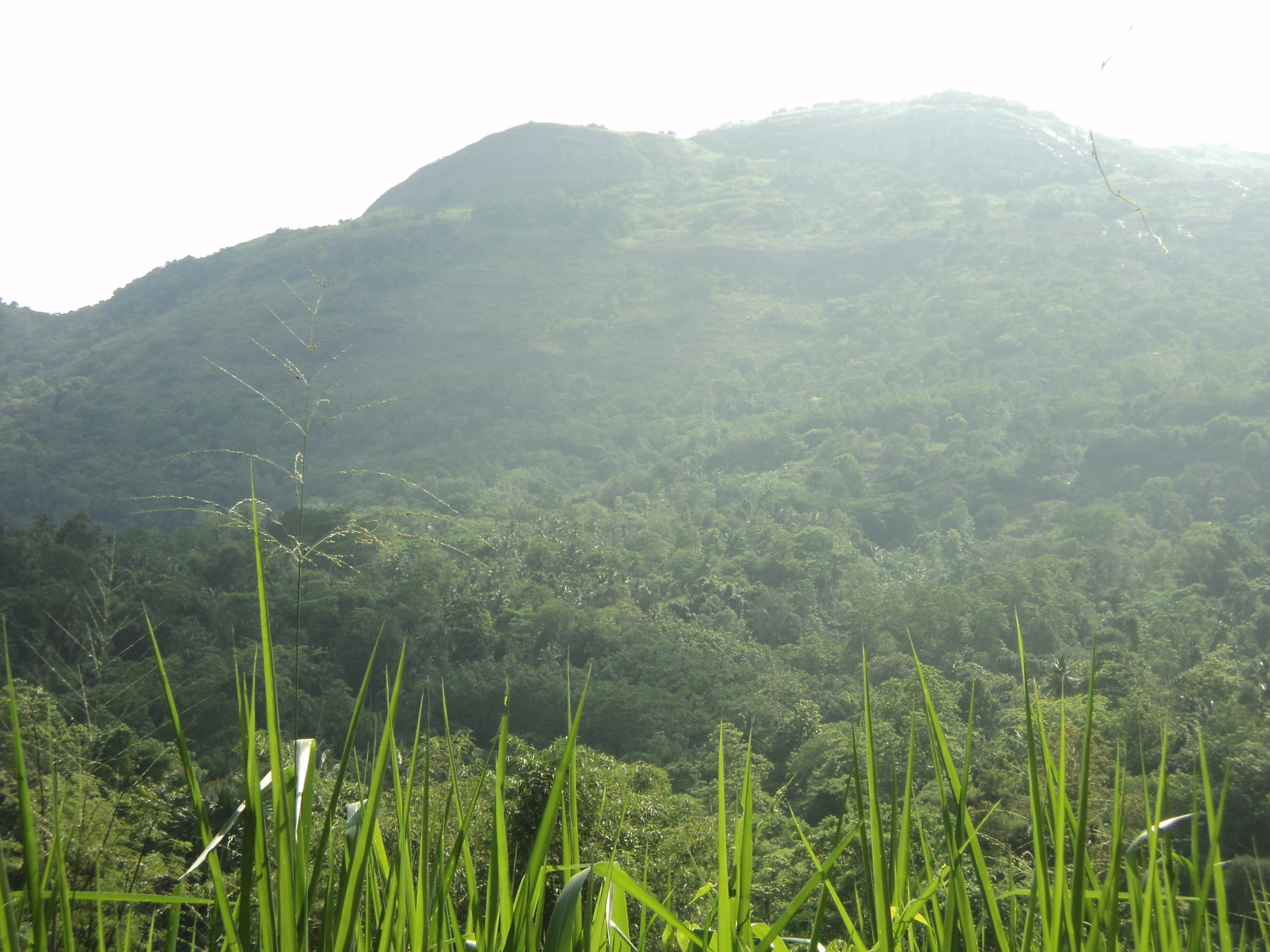
Alagalla from the base of the mountain

Alagalla mountains can be reached by taking either the Colombo-Kandy line to Ihalakotte railway station, or by taking the Kandy-Poththapitiya bus from Pilimathalawa to Poththapitya junction.

If following the Ihalakotte route, trekking can be started at Ihalakotte railway station through the Ihalakotte village. The 6-metre-high (20 ft) Dekinda ella (දෙකිඳ ඇල්ල) waterfall, served by the Alagalla forest reserve, can also be viewed slightly off-route. Alternatively, a slightly longer trekking path via Poththapitiya can be reached by taking the Kandy-Poththapitiya bus route to Poththapitiya junction from Pilimathalawa. In both routes, the support of a local guide is strongly encouraged.

The summit of the Alagalla mountain Range is a platform to witness the view of the other surrounding mountains, including Bathalegala (බතලේගල) also known as Bible Rock, Devanagala (දෙවනගල), Ambuluwawa (අම්බුළුවාව), Knuckles Mountain Range and Hanthana (හන්තාන) Mountain Range.

== See also ==
- List of mountain ranges
- List of Southeast Asian mountains
