= Kadugannawa =

Kadugannawa Sinhala: කඩුගන්නාව Tamil: கடுகண்ணாவை
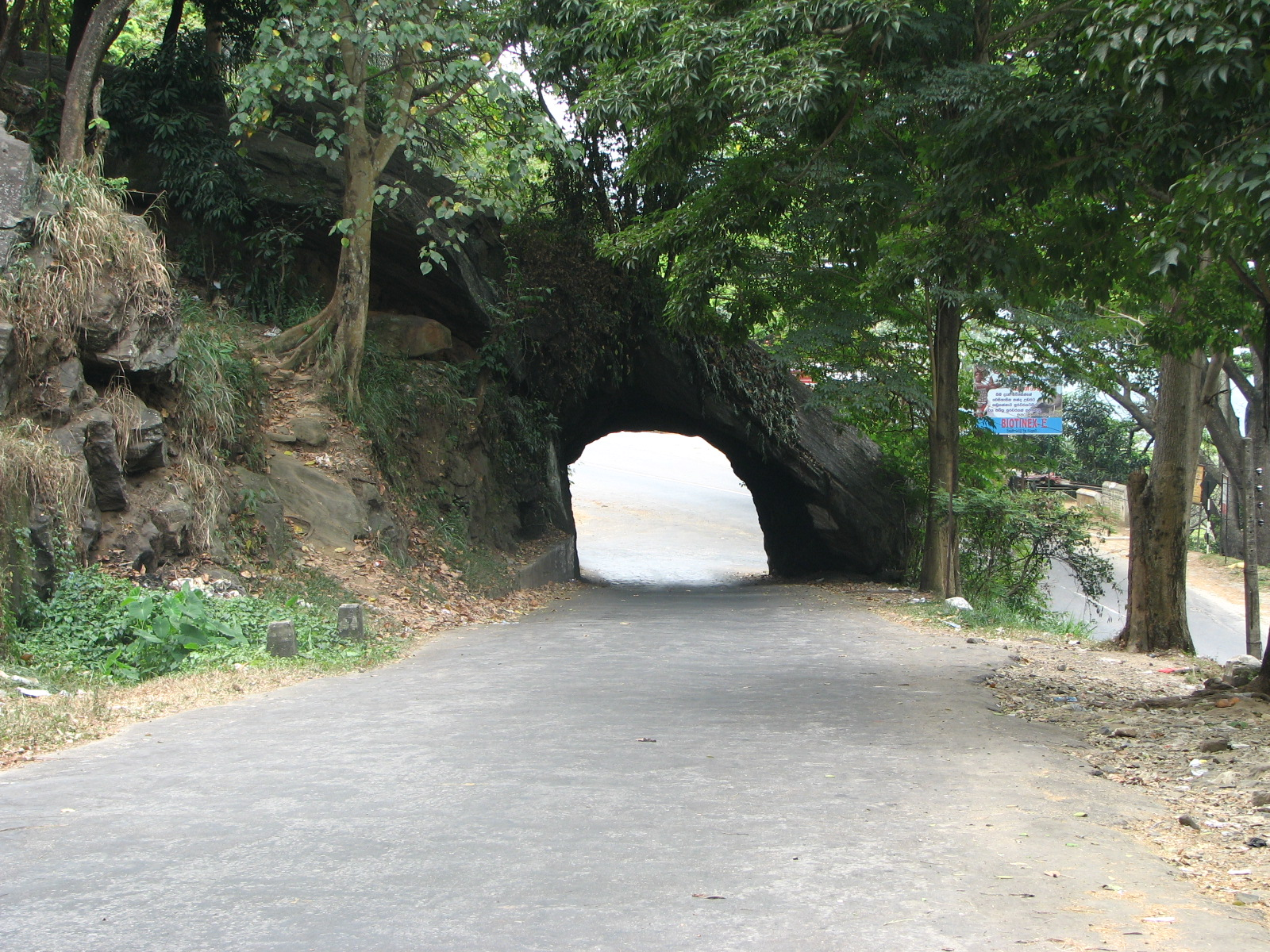
- Rock piercing in Pahala Kadugannawa

- Location in Sri Lanka
- Coordinates: 7°15′25″N 80°31′8″E
- Country: Sri Lanka
- Province: Central Province
- District: Kandy District

Area
  - Total: 0.31 sq mi (0.8 km^{2})
  - Land: 0.31 sq mi (0.8 km^{2})
- Elevation: 1,700.0 ft (518.16 m)

Population (2012)
  - Total: 12,654
  - Density: 40,967/sq mi (15,817.5/km^{2})
- Time zone: +5.30
- Postal code: 20300

Kadugannawa (Sinhala: කඩුගන්නාව, Tamil: கடுகண்ணாவை) is a town in Kandy District in the Central Province of Sri Lanka, governed by an Urban Council. It is located along the A1 road west of Peradeniya. The town is served by Kadugannawa Railway Station and the Kadugannawa Central College is located there.

== Museum ==
Since 2014 it is the location of the national railway museum.

== Kadugannawa Pass ==
Kadugannawa Pass is a pierced rock in the Kadugannawa climb on the Kandy-Colombo road. In the 1820s when the British built the Kandy-Colombo road they pierced a rock at the Kadugannawa Pass instead of blasting it away or simply bypassing it, as the new road does today. An explanation is, that this Kadugannawa tunnel was a symbol. The tunnel is said to have been created to fulfil an old Sinhalese prophecy that there is no way for foreigners to rule Kandy unless they pierce the mountains. The British were the first foreign power to occupy Kandy permanently. Thus, the British went out of their way to include a tunnel on the road. Regrettably, this nice story is disputed, as the Kurunegala tunnel is claimed to have been constructed earlier (in 1823) to fulfil the prophetic saying.

== Dawson tower ==
Under the direction of William Francis Dawson the first modern highway Colombo - Kandy Road was built in 1820 and William Francis Dawson died before the completion of the project. For the memory of William Francis Dawson, the Dawson Tower was built in Kadugannawa.

== Kadugannawa Ambalama ==
Kadugannawa Ambalama (Sinhala:කඩුගන්නාව අම්බලම) is a historic wayside rest that is found – on the left, when travelling from Colombo to Kandy, a few metres before the Kadugannawa Hairpin turn a.k.a. Kadugannawa pass. Built during the early 18th century and is about 200 years old now. This ambalama was built during the British colonial rule of Ceylon.

== Kadugannawa Images ==
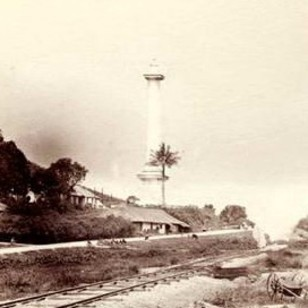
Captain Dawson Tower Kadugannawa. Date Range c.1860-c.1880

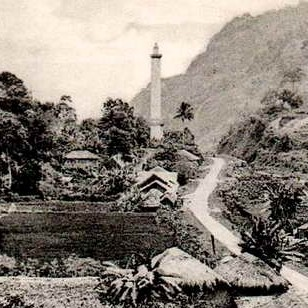
Captain Dawson Tower Kadugannawa-Early 1900s

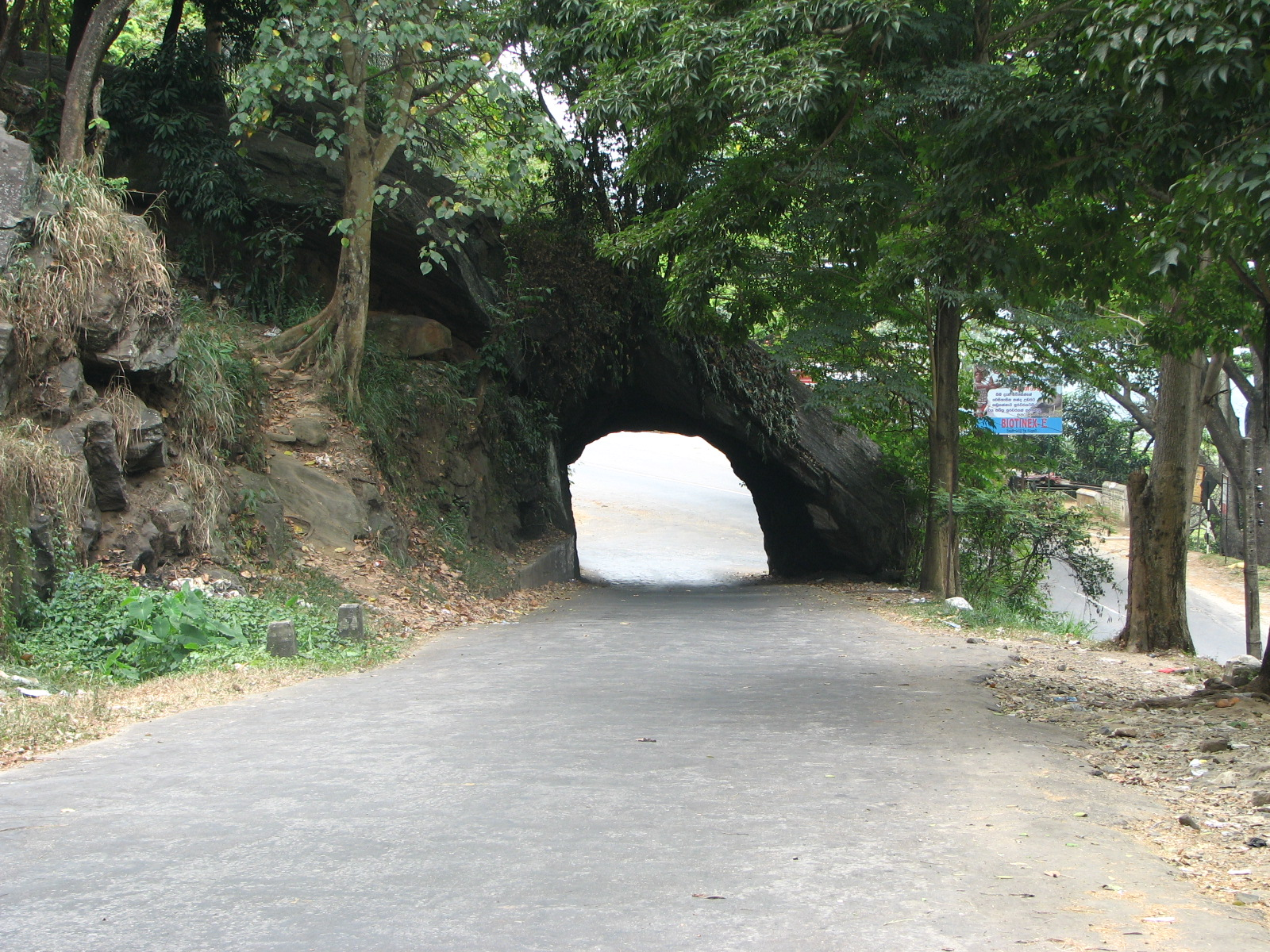
Kadugannawa Pass from top as of February 2007.

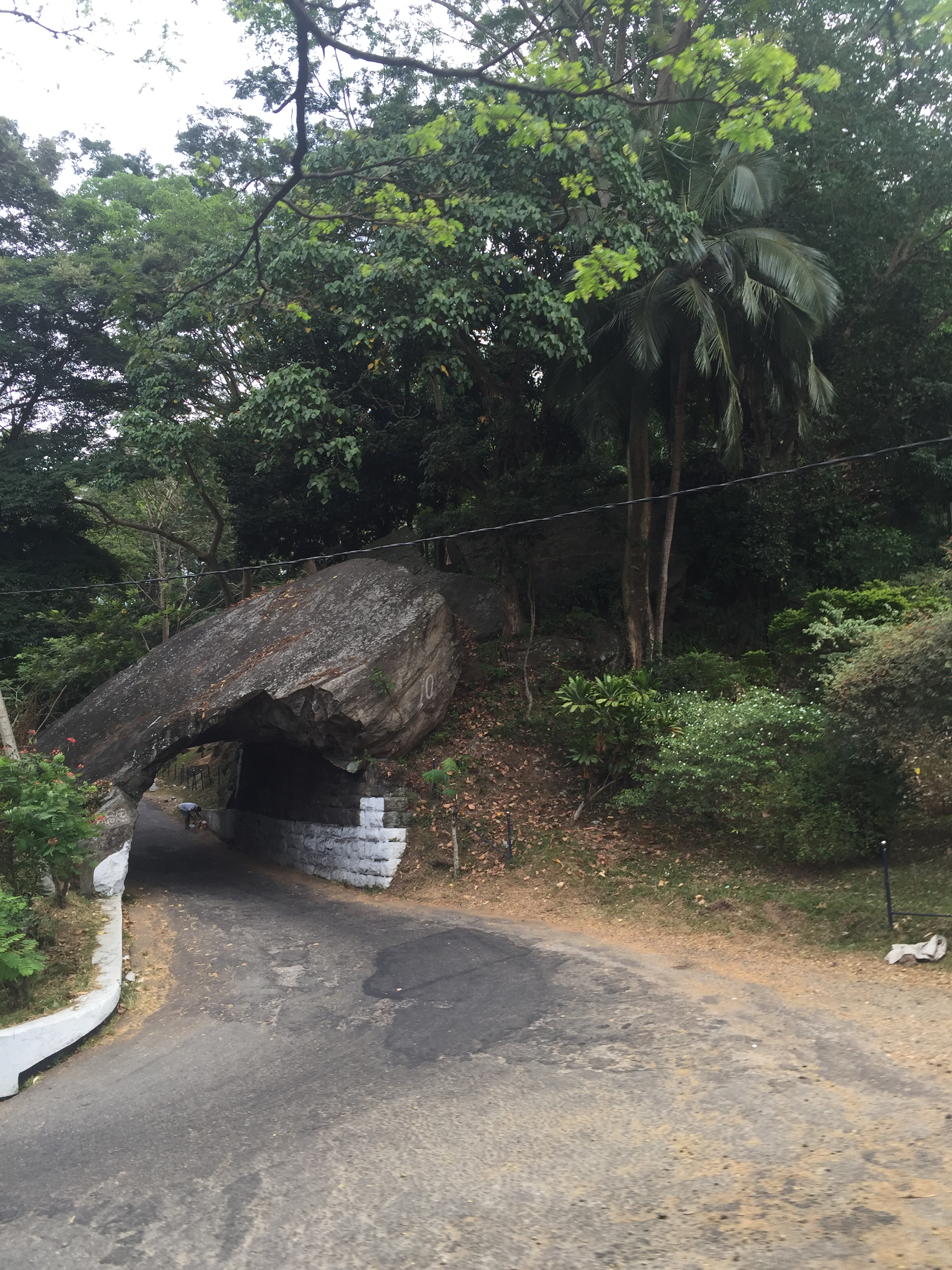
Kadugannawa Pass from bottom as of February 2016.

== See also ==
- Pilimatalawa
- Mawanella
