= William Francis Dawson =

Captain William Francis Dawson (???? – 29 March 1829) was a prominent road builder in British Ceylon (present-day Sri Lanka). An Engineer attached to the Royal Engineers, he was given the task of building the Colombo - Kandy Road linking Colombo and Kandy. The job took its toll on Dawson, who died before it was completed. It would be the first modern highway on the island. In memory of Captain Dawson, the Dawson Tower was erected at Kadugannawa in the Kadugannawa Pass.
