= Ceylon Government Railway E1 =

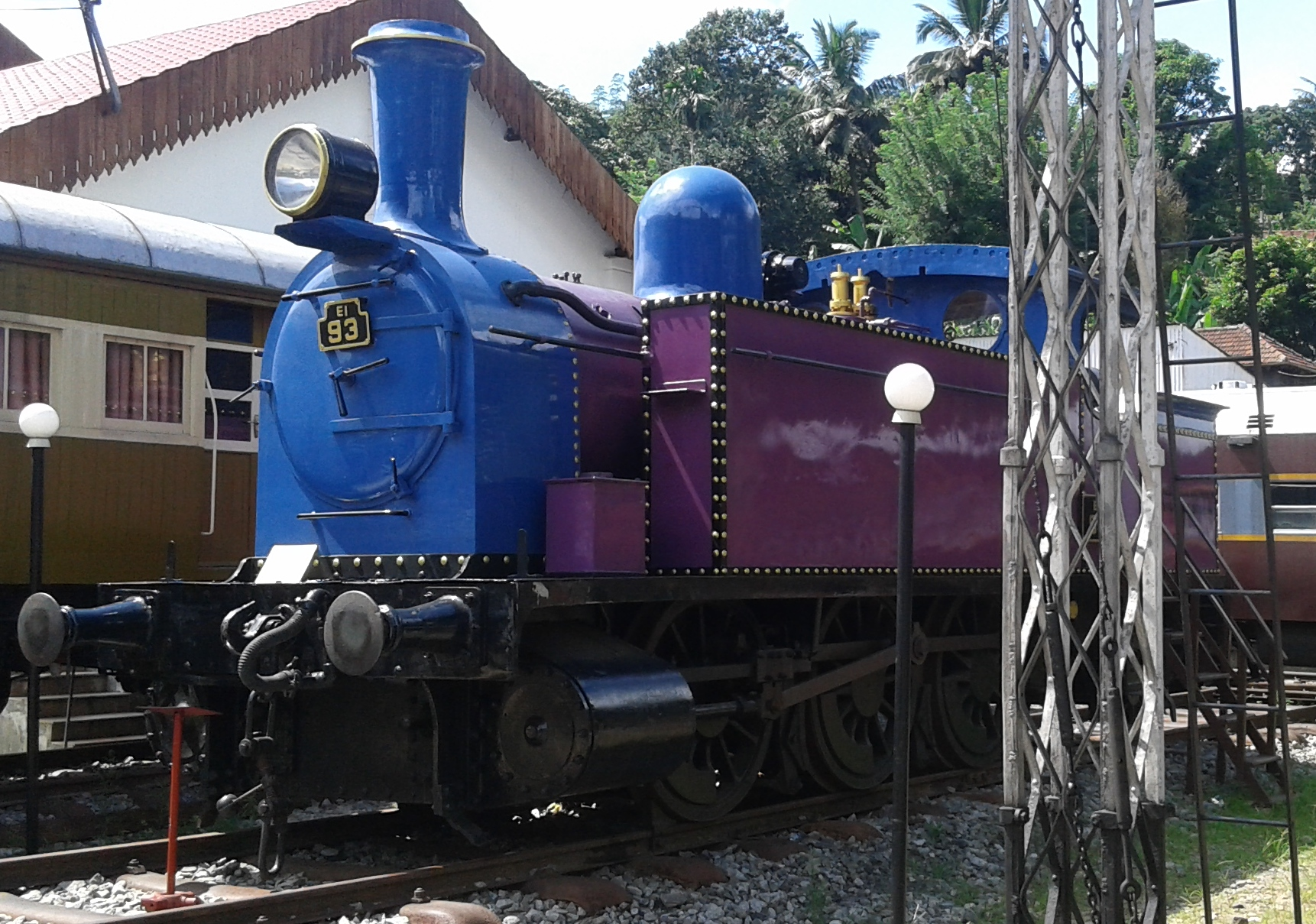
- E1 No. 93, the only preserved member of the class
Type and origin
- Power type: Steam
- Builder: Dübs (E1, E1A); North British (E1B/D); Hunslet (E1C); Stephenson (E1E)
- Build date: 1898 (E1); 1900 (E1A); 1912 (E1B); 1913-1914 (E1C); 1916 (E1D); 1928 (E1E)
- Total produced: 20
Specifications
- Configuration
  - Whyte: 0-6-2 (E1, E1A/B/C/D); 0-6-0 (E1E)
- Gauge: 5 ft 6 in (1,676 mm)
- Driver dia.: 48 in (1.219 m)
- Length: 32 ft 0.75 in
- Axle load: 13 long tons
- Loco weight: 47.70 long tons
- Fuel type: Coal
- Fuel capacity: 4.50 long tons
- Water cap.: 1040 gal
- Boiler pressure: 160 psi
- Cylinders: 2
- Cylinder size: 17 in × 22 in (430 mm × 560 mm)
- Valve gear: Stephenson with slide valves
Performance figures
- Tractive effort: 18,014 lbf (80.13 kN)
Career
- Operators: Ceylon Government Railway
- Preserved: 93
- Disposition: One preserved, remainder scrapped

The Ceylon Government Railway E1 was a class of steam tank locomotive produced for and used by British Ceylon's (later Sri Lanka's) national rail operator.

== History ==
A total of twenty locomotives of the class were produced including the subclasses. There were five subclasses: A, B, C, D and E. The Class E1 was originally designated as the SHUNT Class before the reclassification of 1937. These locomotives were primarily used for shunting duties by the railway. The locomotives were originally of the 0-6-0 wheel configuration, but excluding the E1E subclass, they were all retroactively fitted with a pony axle by the railway and converted into 0-6-2 locomotives.

Only locomotive No. 93 has survived into preservation. Originally built in 1898, it is now part of the national collection at the National Railway Museum in Kadugannawa, and is the oldest surviving locomotive of the Ceylon Government Railway.

== Locomotives ==
List of locomotives
Number	Subclass	Quantity	Disposal
93		2	Preserved
94		2	Scrapped
101	A	1	Scrapped
162	B	1	Scrapped
23	C	7	Scrapped
24	C	7	Scrapped
179	C	7	Scrapped
180	C	7	Scrapped
181	C	7	Scrapped
182	C	7	Scrapped
183	C	7	Scrapped
197	D	4	Scrapped
198	D	4	Scrapped
199	D	4	Scrapped
200	D	4	Scrapped
265	E	5	Scrapped
266	E	5	Scrapped
267	E	5	Scrapped
268	E	5	Scrapped
269	E	5	Scrapped
