= Kadugannawa Pass =

Mountain pass near Kadugannawa, Sri Lanka

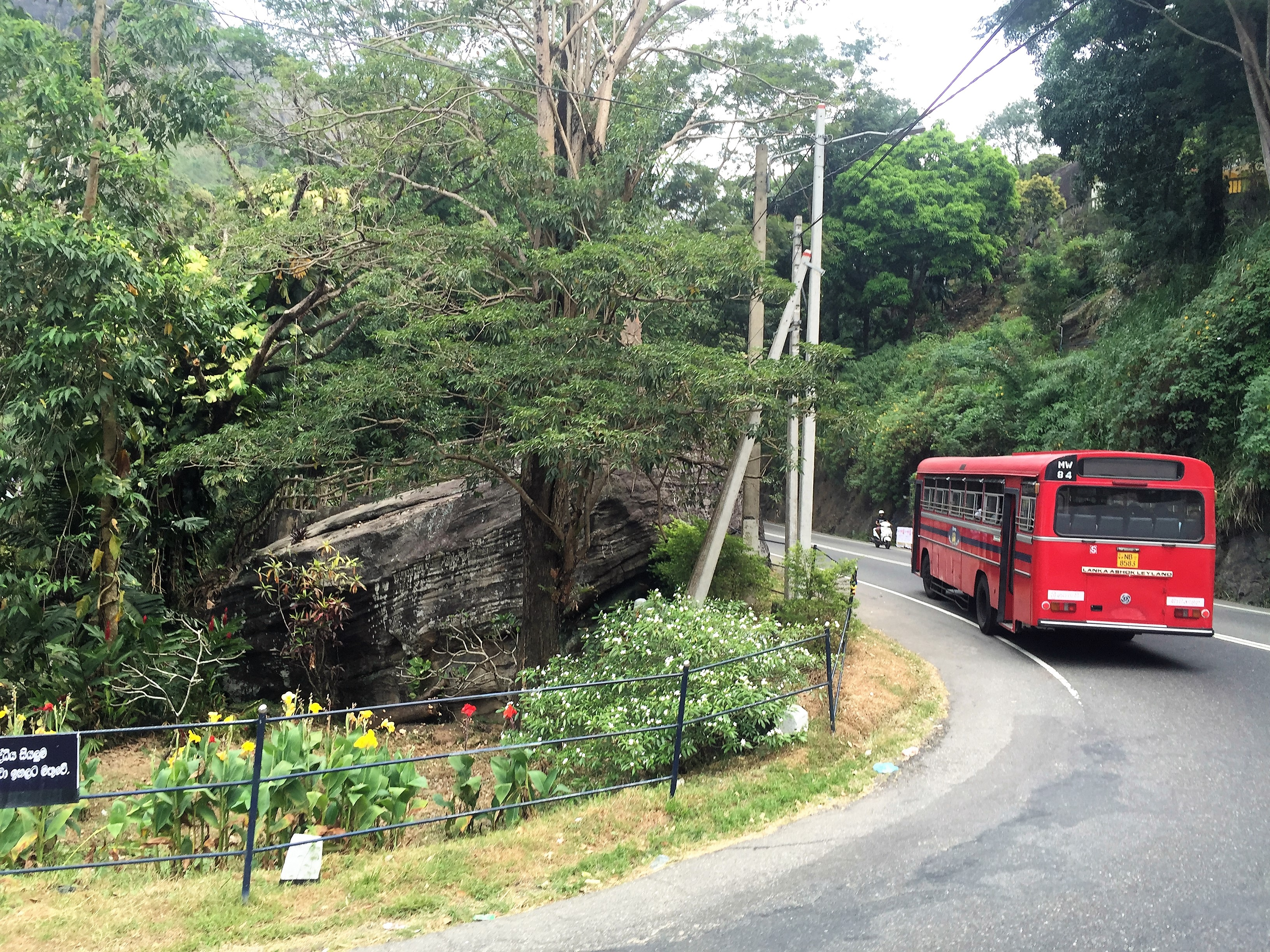
- View of the road at Kadugannawa Pass

- Location within Sri Lanka
- Elevation: 515 metres (1,690 ft)
- Traversed by: Road

Third Approach
- Location: Kadugannawa, Sri Lanka
- Coordinates: 7°15′22″N 80°30′58″E

Kadugannawa Pass is a mountain pass located near Kadugannawa town in the Central Province of Sri Lanka. It is located along the Colombo-Kandy A1 highway. It is a common roadside stop for tourists to enjoy the vistas to the Kegalle valley below and view the prominent inselberg known as the Bible Rock.

== Geography ==
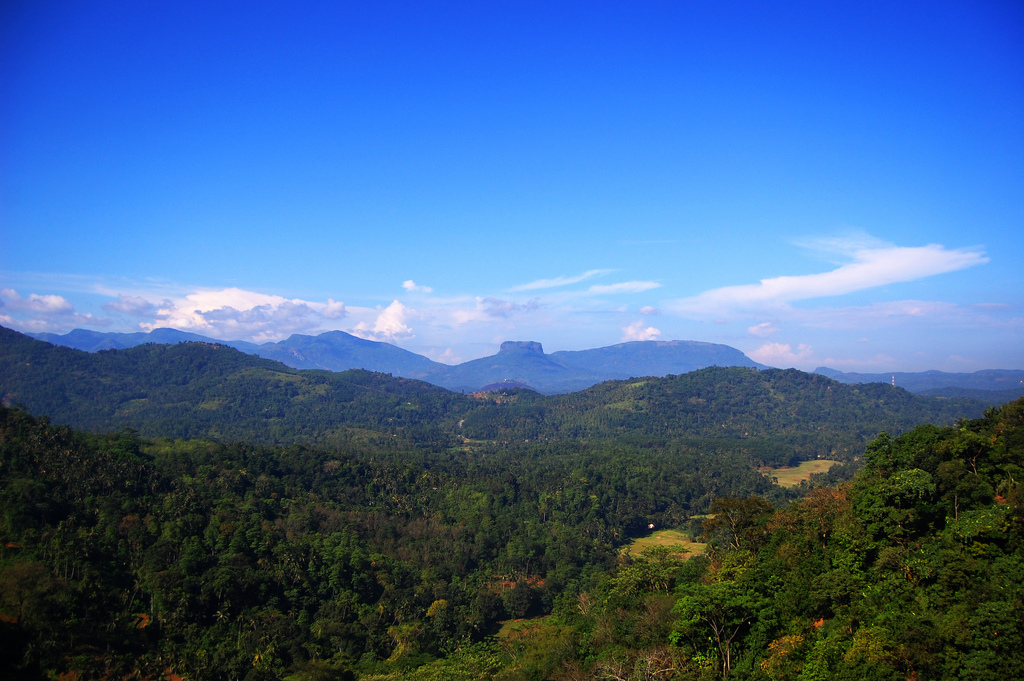
View from Kadugannawa Pass

Kadugannawa Pass is situated at the boundaries of the Central and Sabaragamuwa Provinces in Sri Lanka. The pass lies along the Alagalla mountain range and is surrounded by Ambuluwawa, Knuckles and Hanthana Mountain Ranges on its eastern side. To the west is a precipice with vistas over the Kegalle valley of the river Maha Oya with prominent inselbergs Bible Rock (Bathalegala) and Devanagala.

Kadugannawa Pass incline begins at 290 feet above sea level passing the Higula near Mawanella by road or Rambukkana station by train. The road and rail tracks winds up through rugged terrain and reaches its peak near Kadugannawa Dawson Tower at 1690 feet above sea level.

== History ==
The Kadugannawa Pass was a lookout point in the Kingdom of Kandy. The Balana fort which was the main fortress established to protect the Kandian Kingdom from foreign powers was situated near the Kadugannawa pass.

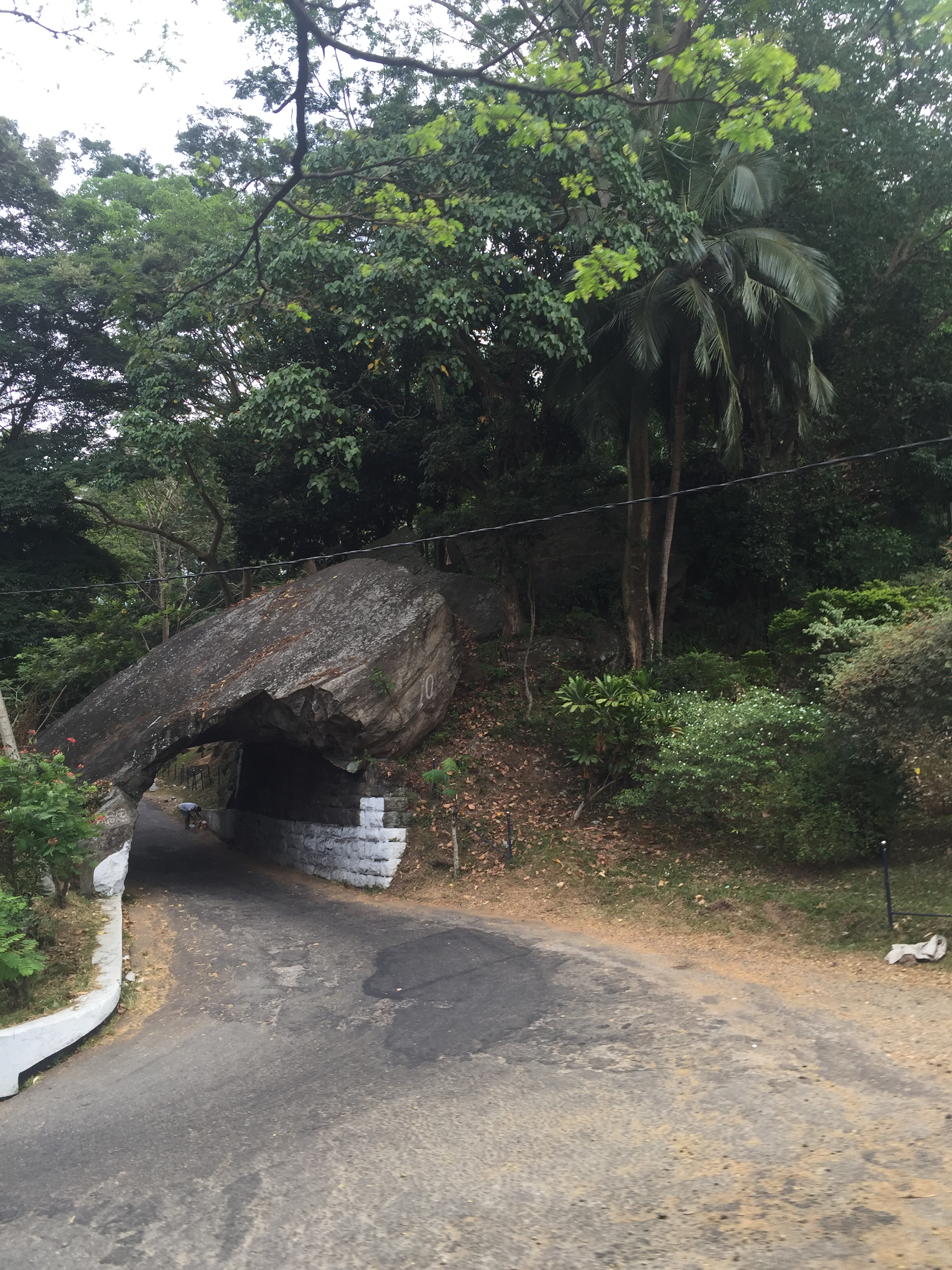
Kadugannawa Tunnel rock piercing.

The British were the first foreign power to occupy Kingdom of Kandy permanently. British Governor Edward Barnes wanted a new road built to Kandy as the old road was long and circuitous. The old road was along the Kelani river valley, via Ruwanwella to the Ma Oya valley, then up the incline to Gampola and on to Kandy. The new road was built through Kadugannawa mountain pass in the 1820s led by Captain Dawson.

When the British built the new Colombo-Kandy road they decided to pierce a rock at the Kadugannawa Pass instead of blasting it away or simply bypassing it, as the new road does today. This rock piercing is known as the Kadugannawa Tunnel and is still preserved though a bypass road was built around it when the Colombo-Kandy A1 highway was widened and upgraded in the late 1980s.

An explanation for piercing the rock is that the Kadugannawa tunnel was a symbol. The tunnel is said to have been created to fulfill an old Sinhalese prophecy that there is no way to foreigners to rule Kandy, unless they pierce the mountains. The British were the first foreign power to occupy Kandy permanently. Thus, the British went out of their way to include a tunnel on the road. Regrettably, this nice story is disputed, as the Kurunegala tunnel is claimed to have been constructed earlier (in 1823) to fulfill the prophetic saying.

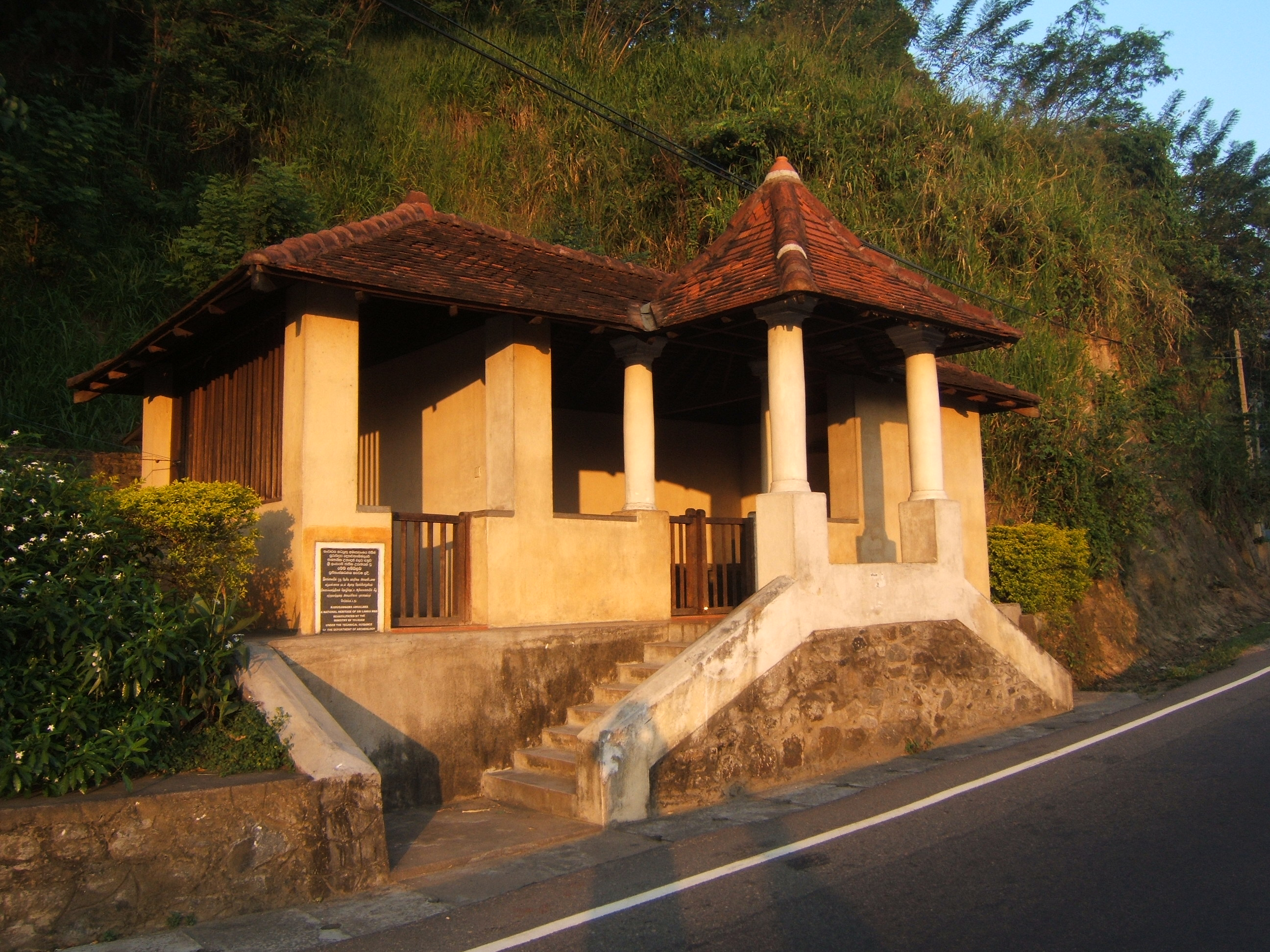
Kadugannawa Ambalama, the old wayside stop near the pass.

Kadugannawa Ambalama is a historic ambalama built a few metres below the Kadugannawa tunnel. It was built in the early 18th century during British colonial rule. During the 19th century it served as a common stopover for horsemen and merchants passing through Kadugannawa pass. It is preserved as archaeological protected monument by the Department of Archeology of Sri Lanka

== See also ==
- Kadugannawa Ambalama
- Dawson Tower
