= Sri Lanka Railways M1 =

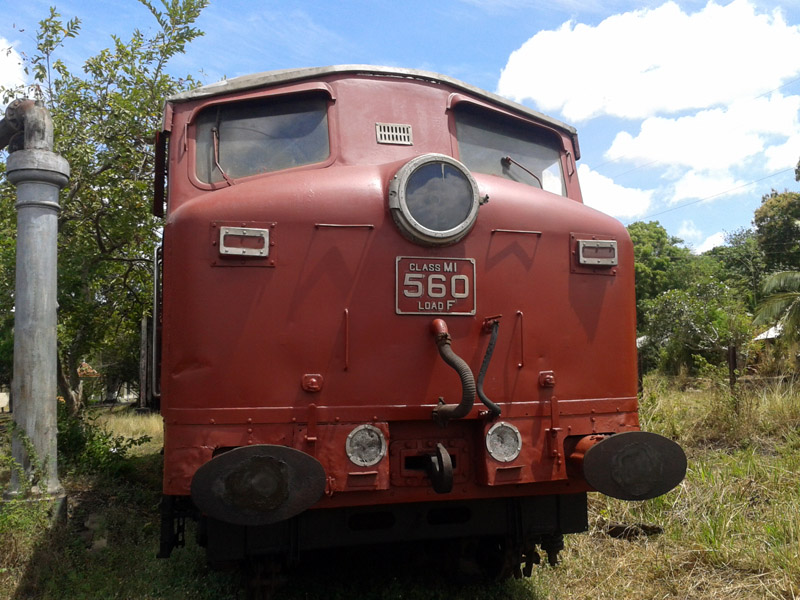
- M1 No. 560
Type and origin
- Power type: Diesel-electric
- Builder: Brush Bagnall Traction
- Serial number: 3025–3049
- Build date: 1952
- Total produced: 25
Specifications
- Configuration
  - AAR: A1A-A1A
  - UIC: (A1A)(A1A)
- Gauge: 5 ft 6 in (1,676 mm)
- Loco weight: 88 long tons (89 t; 99 short tons)
- Fuel type: Diesel
- Prime mover: Mirlees JS12VT
- Engine type: V12, 4 stroke diesel
Performance figures
- Power output: 1,000 hp (746 kW)
Career
- Operators: Ceylon Government Railway » Sri Lanka Railways
- Class: M1
- Numbers: 539–563
- First run: 1953–1956
- Withdrawn: 1983
- Sources: except where noted

Sri Lanka Railways Class M1 is a class of 25 diesel-electric locomotives used by Sri Lanka Railways, imported from 1953 and were removed from service from 1983.

The locomotives were manufactured by Brush Bagnall Traction and weighed 88 long tons (89 t) with a 1,000 hp (746 kW) V12 Mirlees Bickerton day JS12VT four-stroke engine driving a 652kW Brush Electrical Engineering Co Ltd generator.

Locomotive number 560 was restored and is currently on display at the National Railway Museum, Kadugannawa.

== History ==
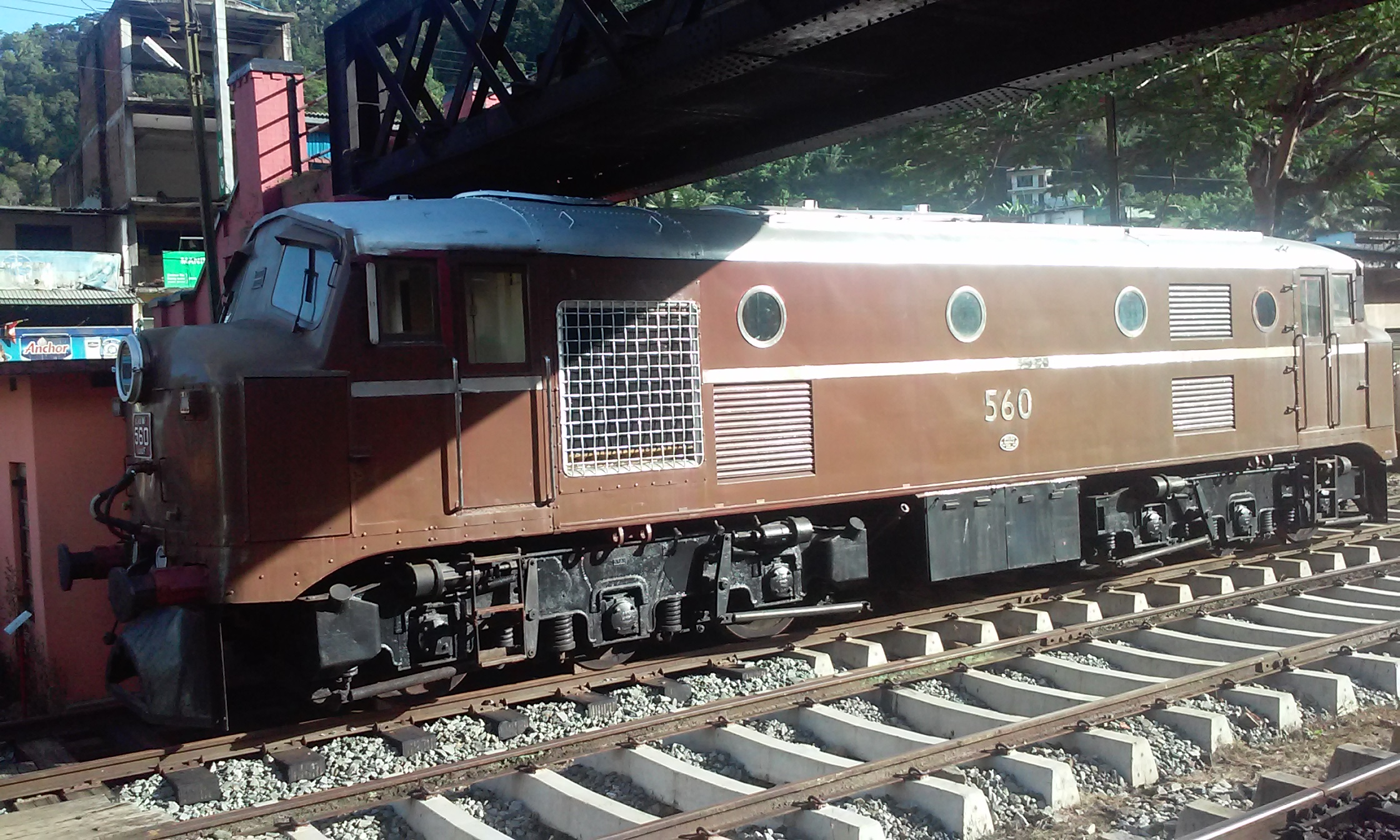
M1 Locomotive at Kadugannawa, Sri Lanka

In the 1950s Sri Lankan Railways was seeking replacements for old rolling stock, routine replacement of which had been delayed by World War II. Specifications were for 25 locomotives with 750 hp (559 kW) power at the wheel, available from 12 mph (19 km/h) upwards, and up to an altitude of 6,200 ft (1,900 m). The train was expected to be used for suburban trains centered on Colombo, as well as mail trains in the north of the country, and trains in hill areas: approximately requirements were for a vehicle capable of pulling 550 long tons (560 t; 620 short tons) at 18 mph (29 km/h) on a gradient of 1 in 44 (2.27%) on track with 5-chain (330 ft; 101 m) reverse curves; preferably within an 80 long tons (81 t; 90 short tons) locomotive weight on 6 axles (A1A-A1A). Several firms tendered for the contact; American suppliers were unable to enter a competitive bid due to the devaluation of both the rupee and British pound.

Brush offered a locomotive with 1,000 hp (746 kW) power, and a generator output of 625 hp (466 kW), capable of multiple working, and was awarded the contract. Five locomotives were supplied (deliveries beginning Jan. 1953) for operational testing – Brush had not been able to fully stress test the units in England due to an absence of a full scale 5 ft 6 in (1,676 mm) test track.

During testing engine overheating was found to be a serious problem on the steeply graded and curving mainline. Other issues requiring attention included fuel pump problems including air-locks, and bogie frame cracking. The electrical circuit for torque control was also modified.

The remaining twenty locomotives, with modifications required to resolve the issues found during testing were delivered from May 1954, at a rate of approximately 1 per month.

== Gallery ==
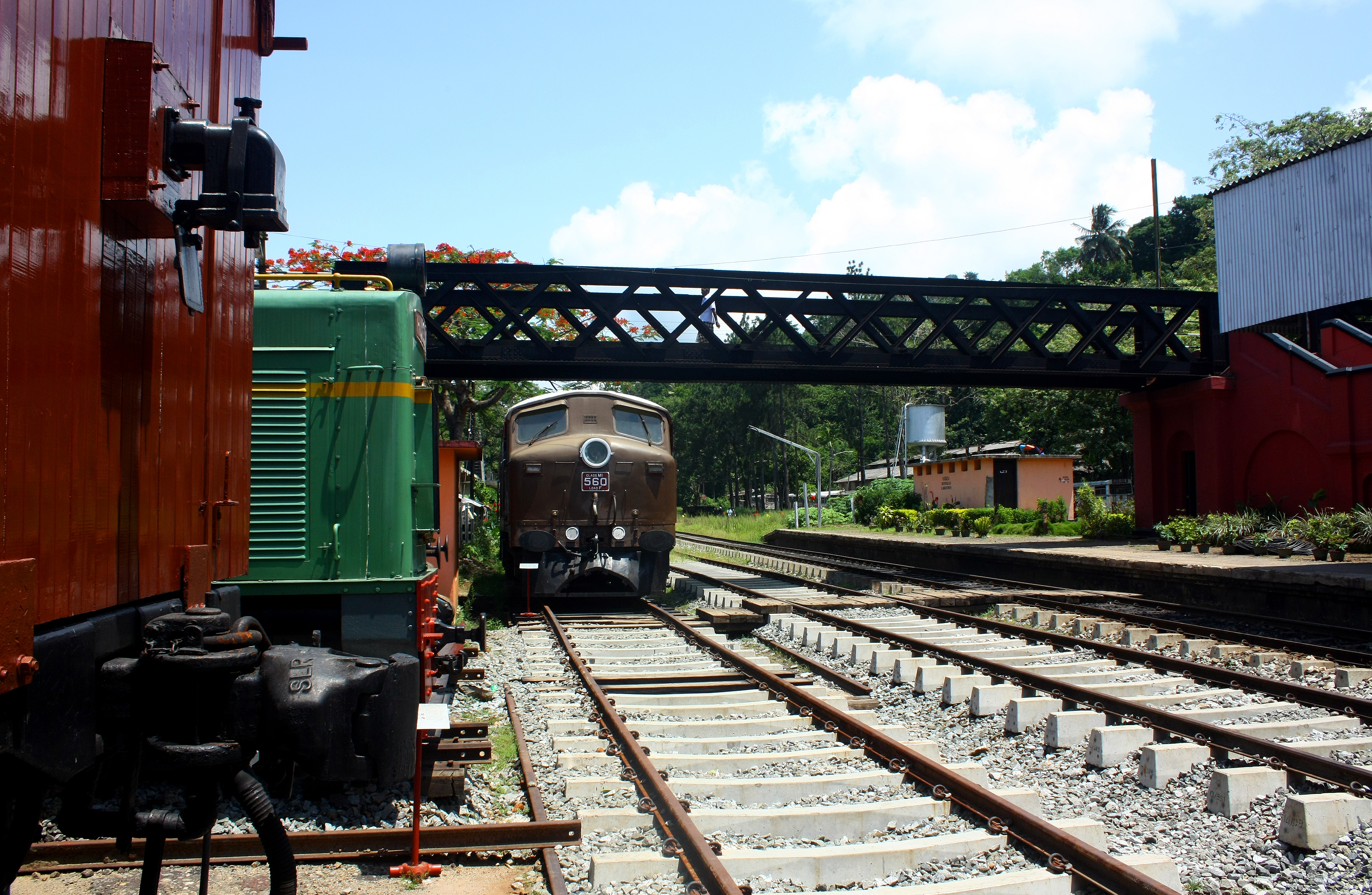
Class M1 locomotive restored at National Railway Museum, Kadugannawa

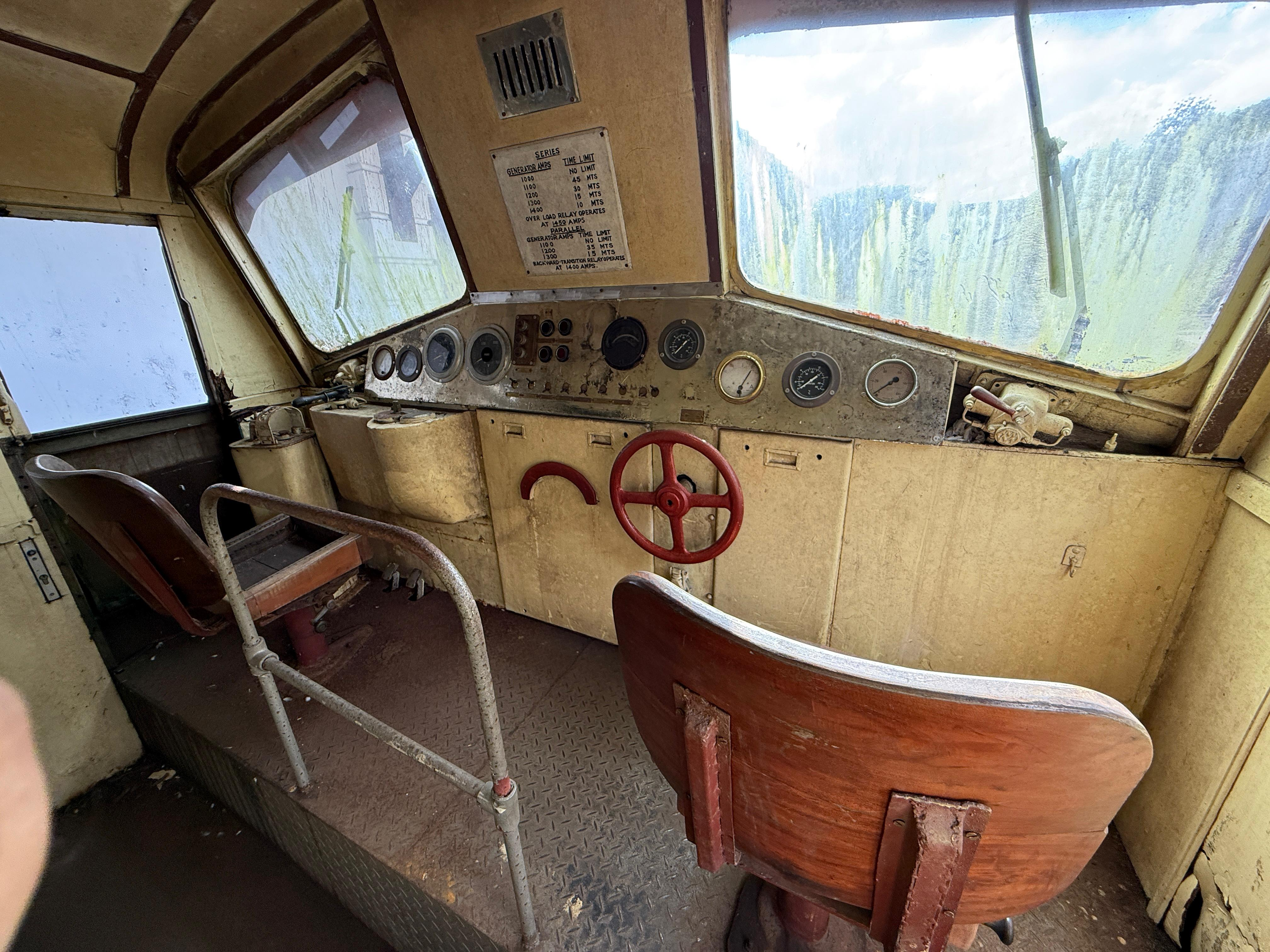
The driver's cab of an M1 locomotive

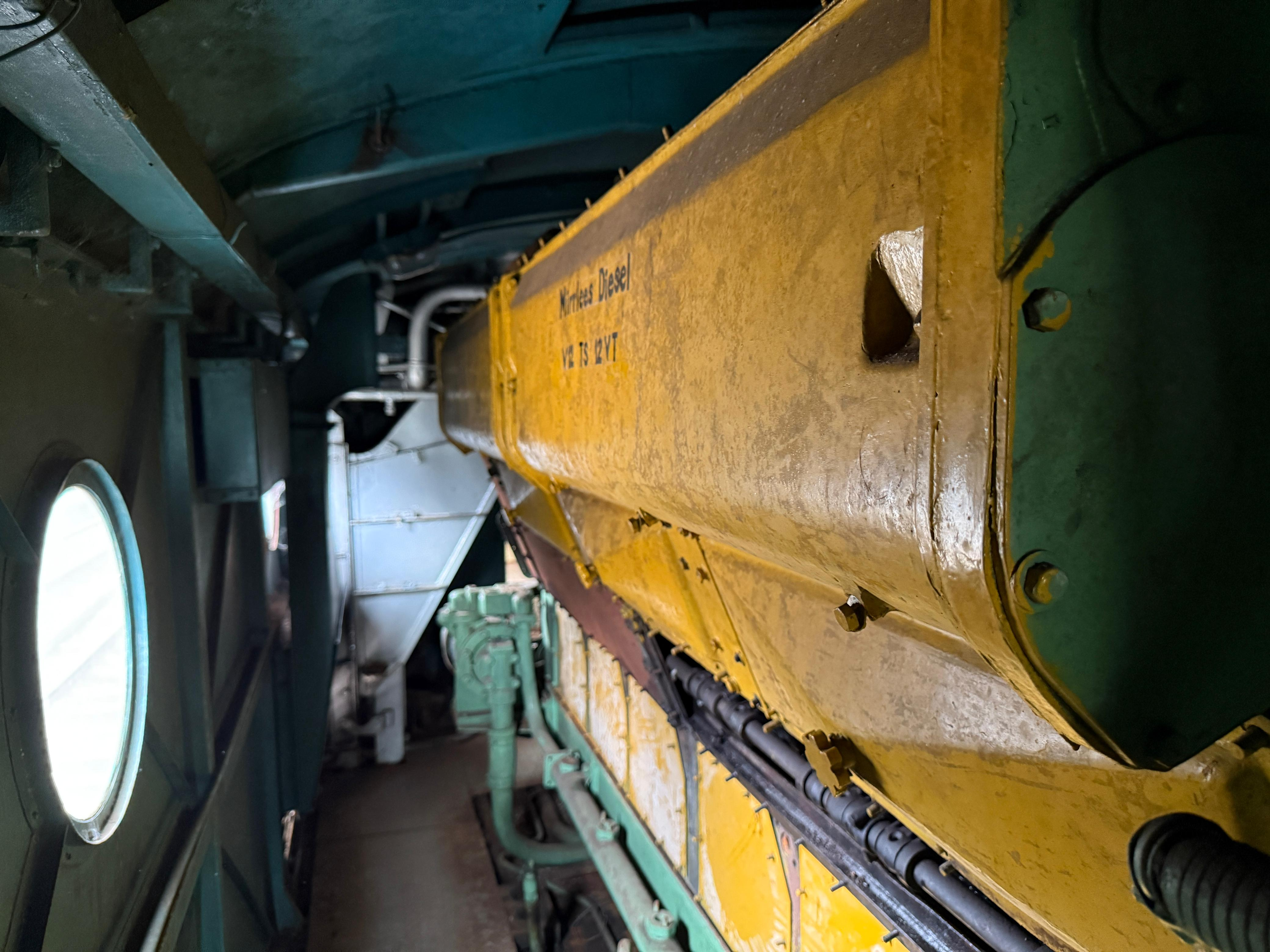
The engine room of an M1 Locomotive

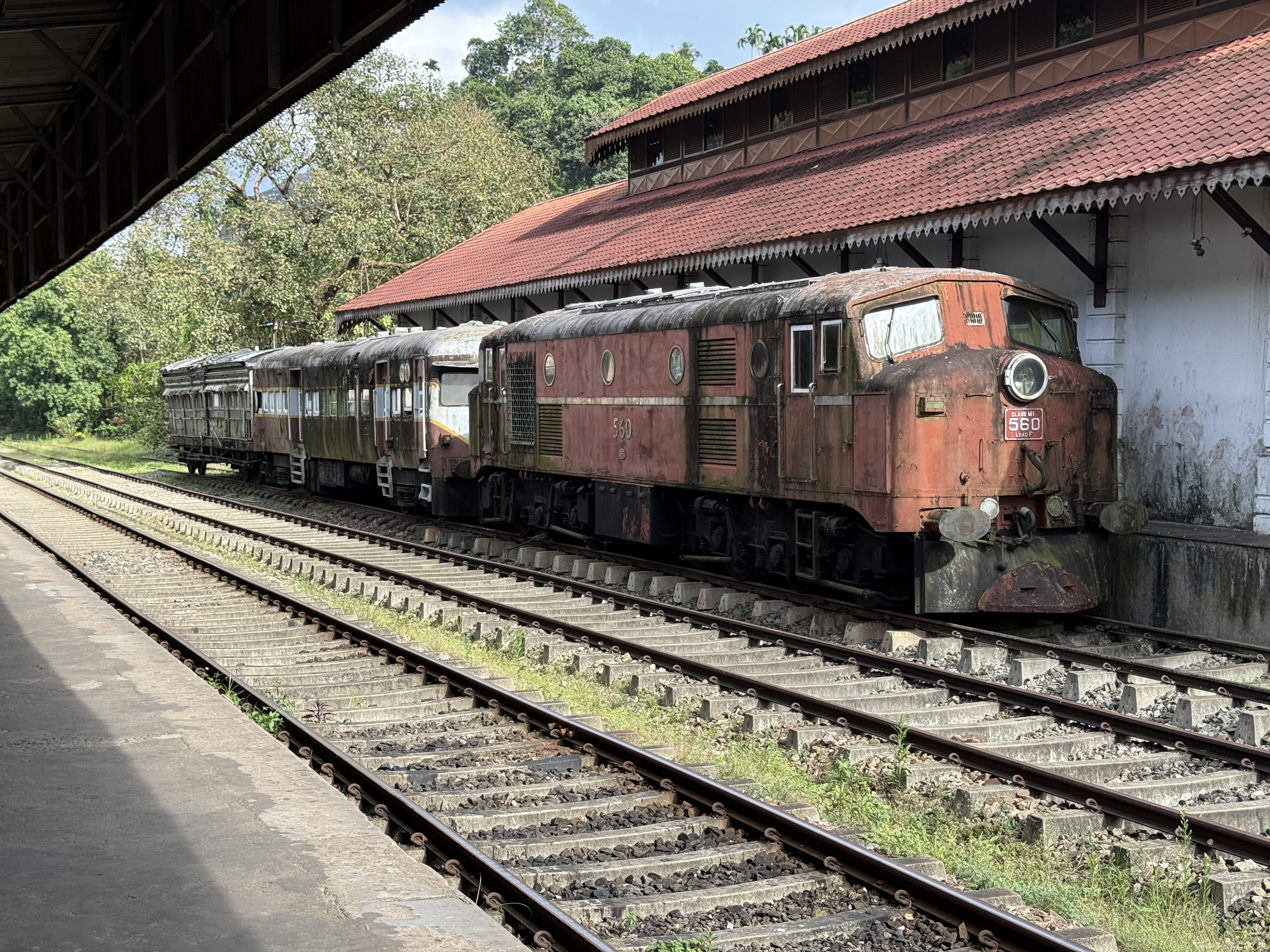
M1 No. 560 at the National Railway Museum, Kadugannawa in 2025

== See also ==
- Locomotives of Sri Lanka Railways
- Sri Lanka Railways
- Brush Traction
