= Bible Rock =

Bible
- Batalegala
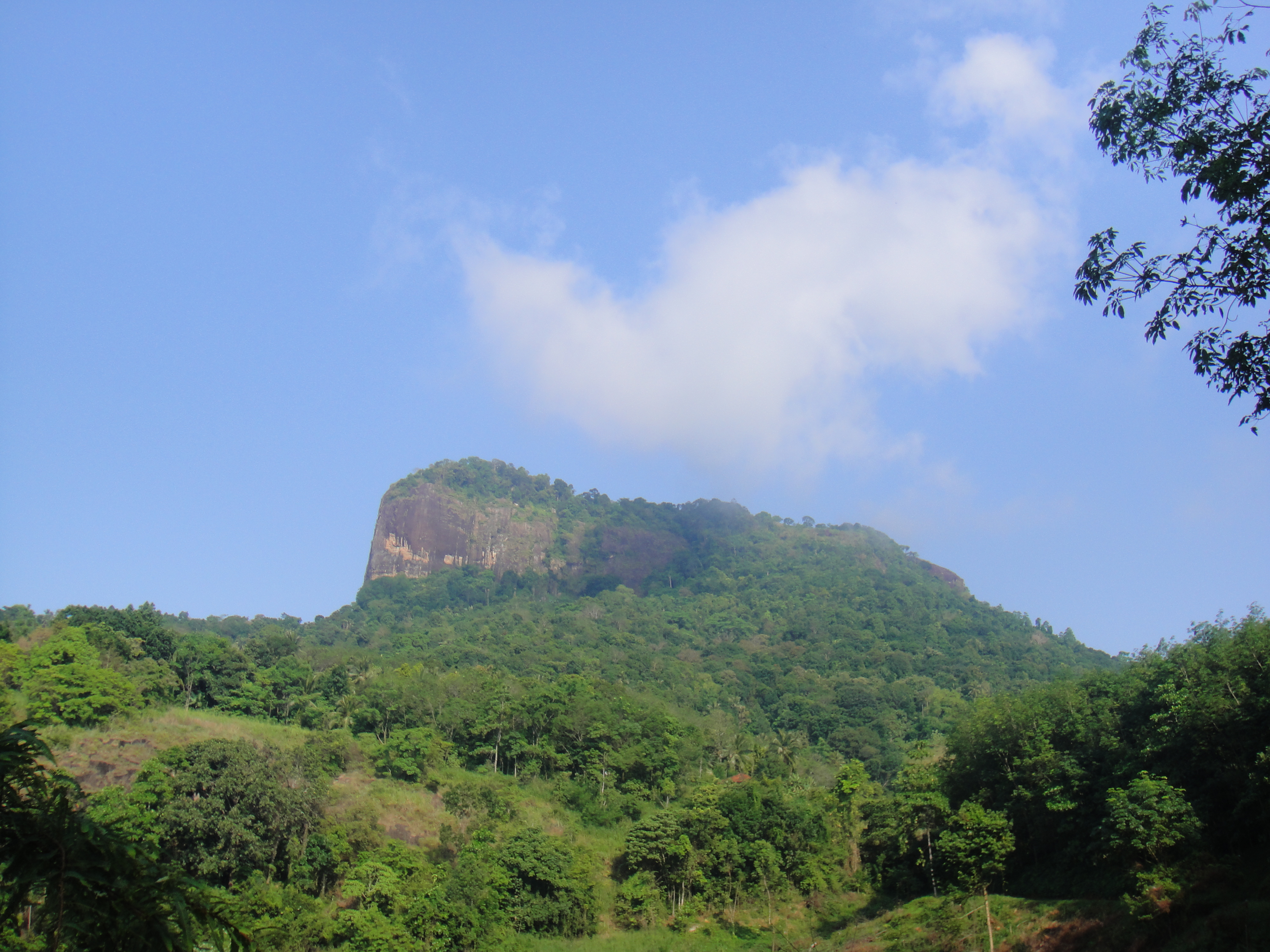
- Batalegala as seen from Ambadeniya village

Highest point
- Elevation: 670 m (2,200 ft)
- Coordinates: 7°11′18″N 80°26′4″E

Geography
- Location within Sri Lanka
- Location: Kegalle, Sri Lanka
- Parent range: Alagalla Mountain Range

Bible Rock (Batalegala in the Sinhala language) is a mountain near the town of Aranayake in Kegalle District in central Sri Lanka. It derives its name "Bible rock" from its resemblance to a book on a lectern.
