= National Railway Museum, Kadugannawa =

National Railway Museum
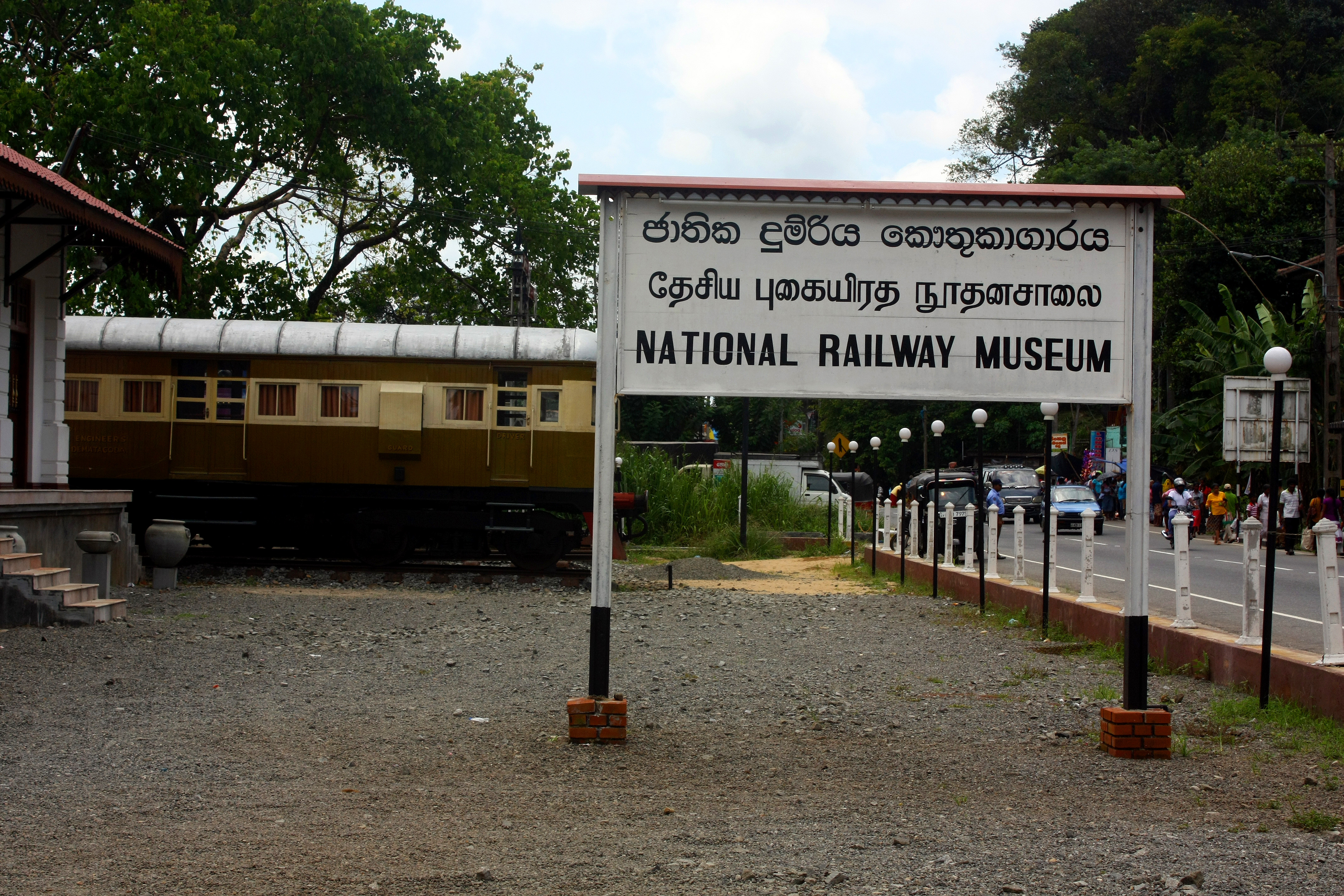
- National Railway Museum, Kadugannawa
- Established: 27 December 2014
- Location: Kadugannawa, Sri Lanka
- Coordinates: 7°15′27.4″N 80°31′15.1″E
- Type: Railway museum
- Owner: Sri Lanka Railways
- Public transit access: Kadugannawa Railway Station
- Website: railway.gov.lk

The National Railway Museum of Sri Lanka is located in Kadugannawa, west of Kandy. The museum is owned by Sri Lanka Railways.

The museum was opened on 27 December 2014 in order to commemorate the 150th anniversary of the railways in Sri Lanka. Previously, the museum was located in Colombo; the old museum was opened in May 2009.

The museum has old engines, locomotives, rail cars, trolleys, carriages, machinery, and equipment that have been used since the beginning of Sri Lanka Railway.

== Operating hours ==
The museum is open daily from 9.00 AM to 4.00 PM and closed on Poya days.

Payment is by cash at counter, and ticket fee is LKR 10.00 to children with school uniforms, LKR 20.00 to children without school uniforms, LKR 50.00 to adults and LKR 500.00 to foreign citizens.

== Locomotive exhibits ==
| Class | Picture | Locomotive Type |
|---|---|---|
| M1 | | Diesel-Electric |
| S3 | | Diesel-Mechanical Push Pull train |
| S7 | | Diesel-Mechanical Push Pull train |
| G1 | | Diesel-Electric Shunter |
| N2 | | Narrow gauge Diesels |
| P1 | | Narrow gauge Diesels |
| E1 | | Steam |

== See also ==
- List of museums in Sri Lanka
- Sri Lanka Railways
