= List of mountains in Strathcona Provincial Park =

The list of mountains in Strathcona Provincial Park lists all mountains in Strathcona Provincial Park recognized by name. All of these mountains are part of the Vancouver Island Ranges.

== Mountains of Strathcona Provincial Park ==
=== 0-9 ===
- Peak 1805
- Peak 1920
- Peak 1909

=== A ===
- Abco Mountain
- Mount Ablemarie
- Mount Albert Edward
- Argus Mountain
- Augerpoint Mountain

=== B ===
- Mount Becher
- The Behinde
- Big Interior Mountain
- Big Den Mountain
- Black Cat Mountain
- Mount Brooks
- Mount Burman

=== C ===
- Castlecrag Mountain
- Mount Celeste
- Mount Cobb
- Mount Colonel Foster
- Mount Colwell
- Comox Glacier
- Mount Con Reid
- Central Crags
- Mount Crespi
- Crest Mountain
- Crown Mountain

=== D ===
- Mount DeVoe
- Mount Donner
- Mount Drabble

=== E ===
- Elkhorn Mountain

=== F ===
- Mount Filberg
- Mount Flannigan
- Mount Frink

=== G ===
- Mount George V
- Golden Hinde
- Mount Gore

=== H ===
- Mount Haig-Brown
- Mount Harmston
- Mount Heber
- Horseshoe Mountain
- Hygro Peak

=== I ===
- Iceberg Peak
- Idsardi Mountain

=== J ===
- Jacklah Mountain
- Jack's Fell
- Mount Judson
- Jutland Mountain

=== K ===
- Mount Kent-Urquhart
- Kings Peak
- Kookjai Mountain

=== L ===
- Mount Laing
- Mount Lombard
- Lone Wolf Mountain

=== M ===
- Marble Peak
- Mariner Mountain
- Matchlee Mountain
- Megin Mountain
- Mount McBride
- The Misthorns
- Mount Mitchell
- Morrison Spire
- Moyeha Mountain
- M.S. Mountain
- Mount Myra

=== N ===
- Nine Peaks

=== P ===
- El Piveto Mountain
- Pearl Peak
- Mount Phillips
- Ptarmigan Pinnacles
- Popsicle Peak
- Pretty Girl Peak
- Puzzle Mountain

=== Q ===
- Quatchka Ridge

=== R ===
- Rambler Peak
- The Red Pillar
- Mount Regan
- Mount Rosseau
- Mount Rufus

=== S ===
- Scimitar Peak
- The Scissors
- Mount Septimus
- Shelbert Mountain
- Shepherd Ridge
- Sid Williams Peak
- Siokum Mountain
- Slocomb Peak
- Splendor Mountain
- Strata Mountain
- Syd Watts Peak
- Sydney Cone

=== T ===
- Mount Thelwood
- Mount Titus
- Mount Tom Taylor
- Trio Mountain
- Tyee Mountain
- Tzela Mountain

=== U ===
- Ursus Mountain

=== V ===
- Victoria Peak
- Volcano Peak

=== W ===
- Wolf Mountain

== Sources ==
- Philip Stone (2003). Island Alpine, A Guide to the Mountains of Strathcona Park and Vancouver Island. Wild Isle Publications: Heriot Bay, BC. ISBN 0-9680766-5-3.
