= Vancouver Island Ranges =

Series of mountain ranges in Vancouver Island

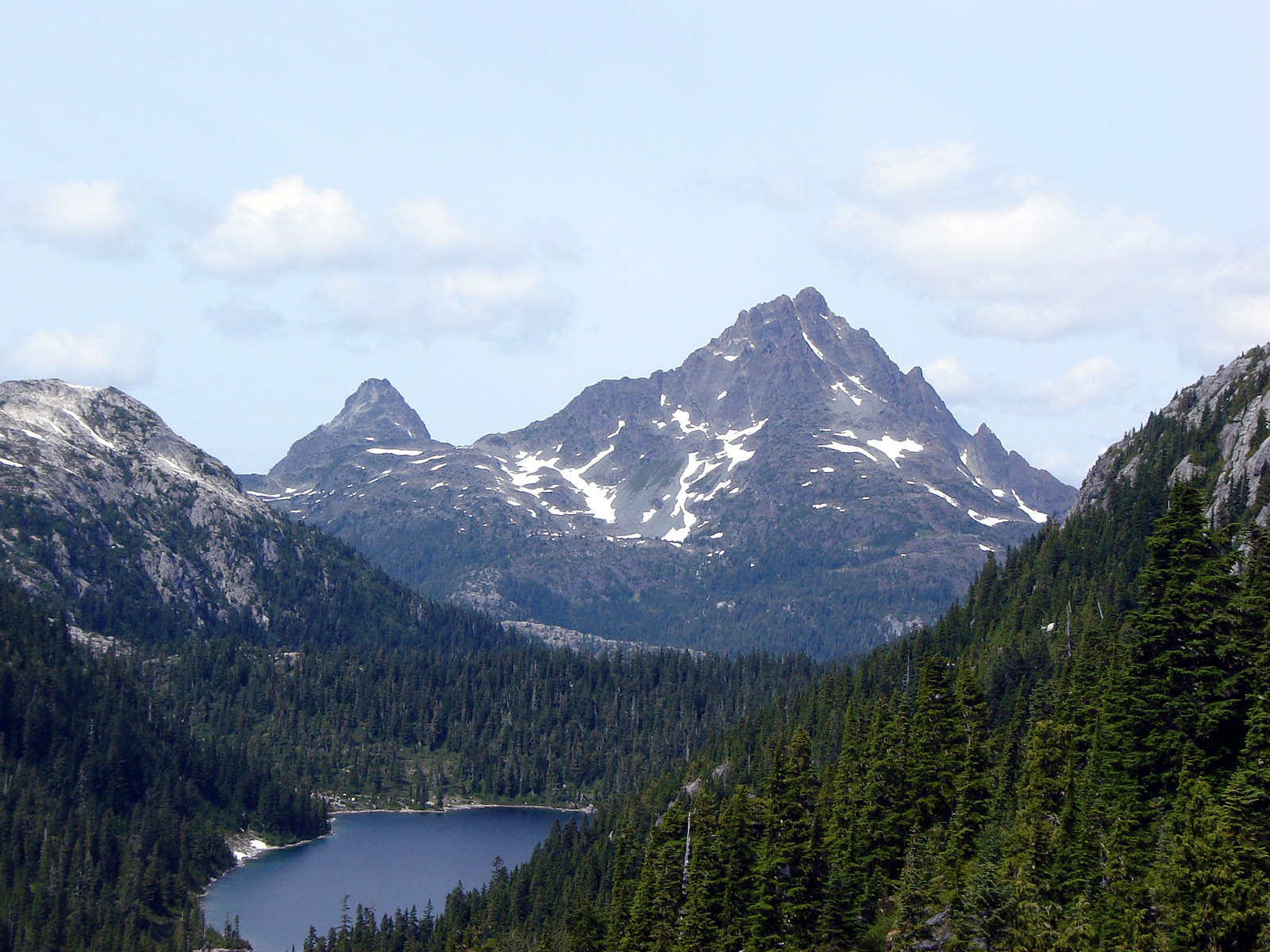
- Golden Hinde, south aspect, August 2006.

Highest point
- Peak: Golden Hinde
- Elevation: 2,195 m (7,201 ft)
- Coordinates: 49°39′43.8″N 125°44′48.6″W

Dimensions
- Area: 45,373 km^{2} (17,519 mi^{2})

Geography
- Country: Canada
- Province: British Columbia
- Range coordinates: 49°40′N 125°49′W
- Parent range: Insular Mountains

The Vancouver Island Ranges, formerly called the Vancouver Island Mountains, are a series of mountain ranges extending along the length of Vancouver Island which has an area of 31,788 km^{2} (12,273 sq mi). The Vancouver Island Ranges comprise the central and largest part of the island. The Geological Survey of Canada refers to Vancouver Island, Haida Gwaii, and the Alaska Panhandle as the Insular Belt including the sea floor out to 100 km (62 mi) west of Vancouver Island. The Vancouver Island Ranges are a sub-range of the Insular Mountains.

== Explorations ==
The first European sighting of these ranges was likely Sir Francis Drake. A sighting of land on June 5, 1579 was recorded by his crew aboard the vessel Golden Hind at a latitude of 48 degrees north but not finding safe harbour, they moved on southward. The highest peak of the Vancouver Island Ranges, the Golden Hinde, is named for his vessel.

The first European explorer likely to have observed any of the mountains of the Vancouver Island Ranges would have been Captain Juan José Pérez aboard the Spanish frigate Santiago. Although he anchored off Estevan Point, on August 8, 1774 he did not land. Captain James Cook entered Nootka Sound March 29, 1778 and spent about a month refitting his ships Discovery and Resolution. His logs contain the first recorded reference to the mountains of Vancouver Island. In 1788 British Captain John Meares began a small settlement at Nootka Sound and the following year, the Spanish built a permanent fort at Friendly Cove (Yuquot) in Nuu-chah-nulth territory. The Spanish claimed sovereignty and a dispute arose which was resolved with the Nootka Convention of the 1794. There was little further exploration until the Hudson's Bay Company was granted rights to Vancouver Island on January 13, 1849 leading to the first attempt, by Captain Hamilton Moffat in 1852 to ascend a major peak on the Island when he attempted Rugged Mountain.

Adam Grant Horne located a trail across the island from the Qualicum River to the Alberni Inlet in 1856 and Joseph Despard Pemberton, Surveyor General of the Colony of Vancouver Island explored much of the southern half of the Island in 1857. The southern Island was further explored by the Vancouver Island Exploring Expedition in 1865. By the mid-1880s the southern half of the island had been explored and by 1890 the northern region had been explored as well. The central part of the island, the area now within Strathcona Provincial Park, was explored by Reverend William Washington Bolton, Headmaster of the Victoria School for Boys, in 1894 and 1896.

== Ranges ==
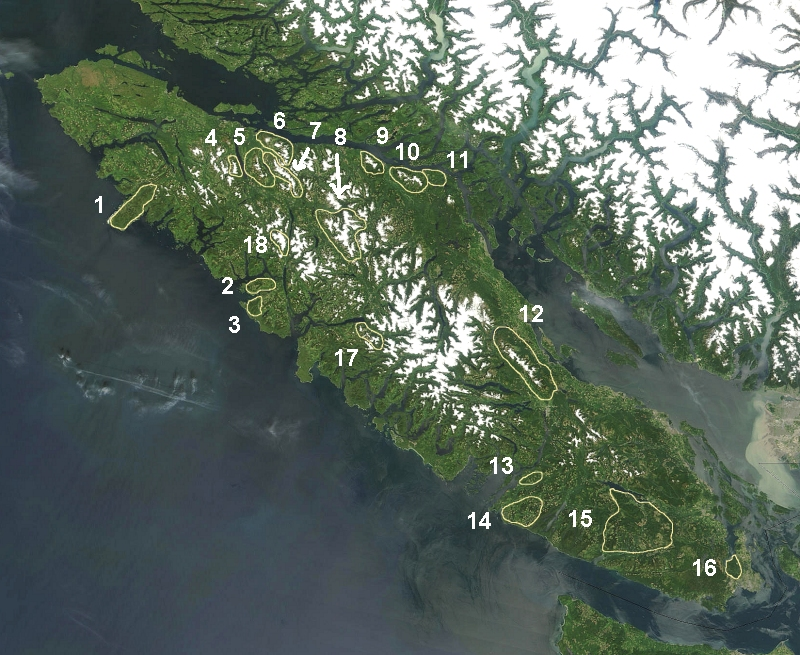
Named Ranges of Vancouver Island

Only a few of the many subranges of the Vancouver Island Ranges have official names. These are:

1. Refugium Range: On the Brooks Peninsula.
2. Sophia Range: On Nootka Island, on the peninsula between Esperanza Inlet and Nuchatlitz Inlet.
3. Genevieve Range: Nootka Island.
4. Karmutzen Range: Between Nimpkish Lake, Tlakwa Creek and Karmuzten Creek.
5. Hankin Range: Between Nimpkish Lake and Bonanza Lake.
6. Franklin Range: Near Robson Bight on the Johnstone Strait between the Tsitika River and Kokish River.
7. Bonanza Range: Between the Nimpkish River and the Tsitika River by Bonanza Lake.
8. Sutton Range: Between Nimpkish River, White River, ktwanch River, Gold River.
9. Newcastle Ridge: Johnstone Strait, west of Sayward-Kelsey Bay and east/north of Adams River
10. Prince of Wales Range: East coast of Vancouver Island 40 km (25 mi) north of Campbell River.
11. Halifax Range: Along Johnstone Strait between Amor de Cosmos Creek and Pye Creek.
12. Beaufort Range: North of Port Alberni and west of Qualicum Beach.
13. Pelham Range: Between the Sarita River and Alberni Inlet.
14. Somerset Range: Between The Pacheena-Sarita River basins and the Klanawa River (between Nitinat Lake and Imperial Eagle channel)
15. Seymour Range: Between the valley of Cowichan Lake, San Juan River and Gordon River.
16. Gowlland Range: Near Victoria between Saanich Inlet and Brentwood Bay. Includes Mount Work Regional Park.
17. Pierce Range: South of Gold River between the Jacklah River and the Burman River.
18. Haihte Range: Between Tashsis River, the Nomash River, Zeballos Lake and Woss Lake.

The Elk River Mountains, located in Strathcona Provincial Park, are considered a range by some sources.

== Peaks of the Vancouver Island Ranges ==
Mountain/Peak	Location	Height (metres)	Prominence (metres)	Range
Golden Hinde	49°39′46″N 125°44′49″W	2,201	2,195	Elk River
Elkhorn Mountain	49°47.4′N 125°49.7′W	2,195	996	Elk River
Victoria Peak	50°03.3′N 126°06.0′W	2,163	1,849	Sutton
Mount Colonel Foster	49°45.0′N 125°52.1′W	2,135	864	Elk River
Mount Albert Edward	49°40.7′N 125°25.9′W	2,093	1,203	?
Rambler Peak	49°44.0′N 125°44.8′W	2,092	647	Elk River
Mount McBride	49°43.3′N 125°39.0′W	2,083	918	?
Kings Peak	49°48.7′N 125°50.2′W	2,065	328	Elk River
Mount Celeste	49°34′N 125°24′W	2,041	369	?
The Comb		2,040	0	?
Mount Filberg	49°48′28.1″N 125°43′39.0″W	2,035	0	?
The Red Pillar	49°31′32.2″N 125°23′21.1″W	2,035	0	?
Mount Cobb	49°47′23.0″N 125°44′51.0″W	2,031	0	?
The Behinde	49°39′51.1″N 125°46′14.2″W	1,989	0	
Mount Colwell (Elkhorn South)	49° 46' N 125° 49' W	1,989	288	
Alexandra Peak	49°44′17.2″N 125°29′31.9″W	1,983	0	
Argus Mountain	49°32′19.0″N 125°23′11.0″W	1,982	0	
Mount Harmston	49°32′56.0″N 125°23′53.9″W	1,982	0	
Mount Regan	49°41′06.0″N 125°25′55.0″W	1,982	0	
Iceberg Peak	49°34′N 125°24′W	1,977	0	
Warden Peak	50°03′44.0″N 126°05′46.0″W	1,970	0	
El Piveto Mountain	49°43.3′N 125°47.2′W	1,969	500	
Mount Rosseau	49°28′44.0″N 125°30′22.0″W	1,962	0	
Comox Glacier		1,960	0	
Mount Haig-Brown	49°46′23.0″N 125°44′19.0″W	1,947	0	
Mount Frink	49°39′48.0″N 125°24′31.0″W	1,921	0	
Shepherd Ridge		1,921	0	
Peak 1920		1,920	0	
Peak 1909		1,909	0	
Mount George V	49°41.6′N 125°25.9′W	1,884	0	
The Misthorns		1,880	0	
Tzela Mountain	49°32.0′N 125°25.0′W	1,880	0	
Rugged Mountain	50°01′31″N 126°40′40″W	1,875	0	Haihte
Mount Adrian	49°45′23.0″N 125°31′45.9″W	1,870	0	
Mount Shoen		1,862	0	
Big Interior Mountain	49°27′38.2″N 125°34′26.0″W	1,863	0	
Sutton Peak	50°02′28.0″N 126°14′07.0″W	1,862	0	
Mount Septimus	49°28′50.0″N 125°30′49.0″W	1,850	0	
Crown Mountain	49°56.7′N 125°48.8′W	1,846	1339	
Nine Peaks	49°25′55.0″N 125°32′57.0″W	1,842	0	
Syd Watts Peak		1,840	0	
Siokum Mountain		1,840	0	
Siocomb Peak		1,840	0	
Mount Mitchell	49°41′17.2″N 125°27′47.9″W	1,838	0	
Jutland Mountain	49°42′06.8″N 125°24′51.8″W	1,838	0	
Puzzle Mountain	49°47′26.2″N 125°54′56.2″W	1,828	0	
Maquilla Peak	50°06′42.1″N 126°20′20.4″W	1,821	0	
Mount Arrowsmith	49°13.4′N 124°35.7′W	1,817	1,429	
Mount Donner	49°41′24.0″N 125°53′31.9″W	1,812	0	
Mount Kent-Urquhart	49°40′35.0″N 125°53′48.8″W	1,811	0	
Mount Myra	49°32′39.8″N 125°36′22.0″W	1,810	0	
Matchlee Mountain	49°37′54.8″N 125°58′00.9″W	1,806	0	
Moyeha Mountain	49°31′00.8″N 125°44′20.0″W	1,804	0	
Mount Cain	50°13.7′N 126°19.6′W	1,804	0	
Mount Abel	50°12.714′N 126°19.218′W	1,800	0	
Ptarmigan Pinnacles		1,800	0	
Morrison Spire		1,800	0	
Merlon Mountain	50°02.0′N 126°41.8′W	1,798	0	
Mount Laing	49°49′27.1″N 125°42′24.1″W	1,798	0	
Mount Tom Taylor	49°28′39.0″N 125°38′16.0″W	1,778	0	
Mariner Mountain	49°27.600′N 125°45.783′W	1,778	0	
Big Den Mountain	49°53.1′N 125°48.8′W	1,776	0	
Peak 5800		1,768	0	
Bonanza Peak	50°19.8′N 126°37.8′W	1,767	0	
Hapush Mountain	50°14.6′N 126°20.0′W	1,767	0	
Marble Peak	49°41.7′N 125°36.5′W	1,767	0	
Splendour Mountain		1,766	0	
Mount Palmerston	50°24′27.0″N 126°20′13.9″W	1,763	0	
Mount Burman	49°37′26.0″N 125°43′52.0″W	1,756	0	
Mount Judson	49°56′24.0″N 125°55′18.8″W	1,747	0	
Mount Beadnell		1,746	0	
Mount Ashwood	50°18′34.9″N 126°36′13.0″W	1,744	0	
Mount Con Reid	49°44′44.2″N 125°44′12.8″W	1,744	0	
Mount Alston	50°01′00.8″N 126°13′31.1″W	1,743	0	
Watchtower Peak	50°05′13.9″N 126°13′37.9″W	1,740	0	
Mount Russell	50°23′04.9″N 126°21′47.9″W	1,740	0	
Elk Mountain		1,737	0	
Ya'ai Peak	50°02.4′N 126°41.3′W	1,736	0	
Trio Mountain	49°52′45.8″N 126°00′11.9″W	1,732	0	
Phillips Ridge	49°35′48.8″N 125°40′50.2″W	1,732	0	
Mount Thelwood	49°32.3′N 125°44.0′W	1,731	0	
Mount Phillips	49°37′13.1″N 125°34′44.1″W	1,723	0	
Mount Adam	50°07′14.2″N 126°13′22.1″W	1,729	0	
Mount DeVoe	49°41′33.0″N 125°48′24.0″W	1,710	0	
Haihte Spire	50°02′58″N 126°42′0″W	1,706	0	
Jagged Mountain	50°16′01.9″N 126°17′28.0″W	1,701	0	
Whiltilla Mountain	50°21′59.0″N 126°42′20.9″W	1,693	0	Bonanza Range
Popsicle Peak	49°37′27.9″N 125°54′51.8″W	1,682	0	
Mount Bate	49°53′24.0″N 126°28′24.0″W	1,680	0	
Volcano Peak		1,676	0	
Mount Abraham		1,676	0	
South Blades		1,676	0	
Scimitar Peak		1,676	0	
Tyee Mountain	49°58′45.8″N 125°53′39.1″W	1,672	0	
Hkusam Mountain	50°20′05.0″N 125°50′27.0″W	1,670	0	Prince of Wales
Mount Heber	49°53′48.8″N 125°55′00.8″W	1,666	0	
Crest Mountain	49°52′18.8″N 125°52′34.0″W	1,661	0	
Tsitika Mountain	50°25′36.1″N 126°39′06.1″W	1,657	0	
Mount Juliet	50°15′29.2″N 126°10′15.9″W	1,637	0	
Ms. Mountain	49°39′08″N 125°53′23″W	1,655	0	
Mount Nora	50°09′15.1″N 126°06′50″W	1,648	0	
Mount Sarai		1,646	0	
Mount Derby	50°26′17.2″N 126°32′21.8″W	1,646	0	
Klitsa Mountain	49°15′14.0″N 125°13′53.0″W	1,642	0	
Queen Peak	50°02′55.0″N 126°03′14.0″W	1,640	0	
Mount Romeo	50°15′33.8″N 126°12′29.2″W	1,637	0	
Mount McKelvie	49°59′17.2″N 126°34′50.9″W	1,630	0	
Hyro Peak		1,628	0	
Eden Mountain	50°14′11.0″N 126°14′52.1″W	1,625	0	
Mount Cokely	49°14′21.8″N 124°35′12.1″W	1,616	0	
Kokummi Mountain	50°05′55.0″N 126°08′22.9″W	1,615	0	Sutton
Thumb Peak		1,615	0	
Mount Moriarty	49°08.3′N 124°27.1′W	1,610	0	
Big Baldy Mountain	49°45.6′N 126°08.0′W	1,610	0	
Bancroft Peak		1605?	0	
Waring Peak		1,601	0	
The Scissors		1,597	0	
Woss Mountain	50°03′34.9″N 126°33′37.1″W	1,594	0	
Mount Washington	49°45′N 125°18′W	1,585	510	
Mount Elliott	50°17′26.9″N 126°29′39.1″W	1,581	0	
Zeballos Peak	50°05′48.0″N 126°46′08.0″W	1,576	0	
Mount McQuillan	49°06′33.8″N 124°36′18.0″W	1,575	0	
Malaspina Peak	49°51.9′N 126°32.1′W	1,573	0	
Peak 5150		1,570	0	
Nahmint Mountain	49°12.5′N 125°12.8′W	1,568	0	
Mount Peel		1,564	0	
Mount Joan	49°24.9′N 124°55.2′W	1,557	0	Beaufort
Mount Grattan	49°54.4′N 126°29.2′W	1,550	0	
Mount Flannigan	49°55.2′N 125°43.9′W	1,550	0	
Mount ʻAlava	49°53.4′N 126°29.8′W	1,550	0	
Pinder Peak	50°11.7′N 126°55.8′W	1,542	0	
Mount Whymper	48°57.1′N 124°09.7′W	1,541	0	
Abco Mountain	49°25.5′N 125°51.3′W	1,526	0	
Peak 5005		1,525	0	
Stevens Peak	49°51.4′N 126°27.4′W	1,509	0	
Barad-dur		1,505	0	
Mook Peak	50°09.2′N 126°51.7′W	1,505	0	
El Capitan Mountain	48°57.3′N 124°13.2′W	1,492	0	
Mount Service	48°57.8′N 124°15.1′W	1,490	0	
Douglas Peak	49°07.7′N 124°38.6′W	1,490	0	
Genesis Mountain		1,486	0	
Mount Titus		1,481	0	
Conuma Peak	49°49.7′N 126°18.6′W	1,481	0	
Limestone Mountain	49°05.7′N 124°38.7′W	1,480	0	
Adder Peak	49°14.9′N 125°19.0′W	1,480	0	
Megin Mountain	49°32.3′N 126°03.2′W	1,480	0	
Lone Wolf Mountain	49°27′58.0″N 125°54′46.1″W	1,479	734	
The Stone Trolls		1,478	0	
Ursus Mountain	49°24.2′N 125°42.9′W	1,471	0	
Mount Milner	50°19.3′N 125°46.9′W	1,470	0	Prince of Wales
Steamboat Peak	49°13.2′N 125°25.3′W	1,465	0	
Mount Roberts	50°18.8′N 125°43.5′W	1,463	0	Prince of Wales
Mount Leiner	49°57.7′N 126°34.5′W	1,458	0	
Mount Kitchener	50°17.8′N 125°42.1′W	1,457	0	
Tlakwa Mountain	50°18.7′N 127°03.1′W	1,457	0	
Mount Sir John	50°28.2′N 126°38.7′W	1,429	0	Franklin
Karmutzen Mountain	50°21.22′N 127°42.8′W	1,426	0	Karmutzen
Leighton Peak	49°51.8′N 126°20.1′W	1,411	0	
Merry Widow Mountain	50°20.4′N 127°17.1′W	1,402	0	
Snowsaddle Mountain	50°14.5′N 127°12.5′W	1,400	0	Refugium
Jacklah Mountain	49°36.4′N 126°10.4′W	1,400	0	
Mount Cederstedt		1,379	0	
Half Dome	50°03.2′N 126°41.7′W	1,365	0	Haihte
Mount De Cosmos	49°07.1′N 124°12.9′W	1,355	0	
Peak 4400		1,341	0	
Peak 4330		1,319	0	
Kaouk Mountain	50°02.1′N 126°52.1′W	1,309	0	
Peak 4225		1,287	0	
Kwois Peak		1,274	0	
Mount Wolfenden	50°25.6′N 127°34.0′W	1273	0	
Garibaldi Peaks	50°11.2′N 127°13.5′W	1,235	0	
Hannah Mountain	49°04.2′N 124°57.5′W	1,250	0	
Twin Peaks		1,208	953	
Shelbert Mountain		1,207	0	
Mount Brenton	48°54.1′N 123°50.8′W	1,200	0	
Mamat Mountain	50°00.3′N 126°54.2′W	1,161	0	
Lukwa Mountain	50°00.2′N 126°46.3′W	1,142	0	
Mount Renwick		1,139	0	
Mount Gore	49°36.6′N 126°22.7′W	1,120	0	
Grayback Peak	49°59.7′N 126°44.3′W	1,119	0	
Carter Peak		1,097	0	
Comestock Peak		1,097	0	
Mount Rufus	49°35.8′N 126°21.6′W	1,080	0	
False Ears	50°07.5′N 127°08.6′W	1,063	0	
Mount Albemarie	49°34.7′N 126°27.7′W	1,040	0	
Mount Clark	50°21.7′N 127°31.5′W	1,036	0	
Mount Benson	49.14972°N 124.05111°W	1,023	668	
Pretty Girl Peak	49°31.0′N 126°15.0′W	1,020	0	
Mount Pickering	50°22.4′N 127°34′W	1,006	0	?
Sydney Cone	49°31.2′N 126°19.2′W	996	0	?
Mount Seaton		957	0	?
Mount Crespi	49°36.1′N 126°27.9′W	920	0	?
Mount Lombard	49°34.5′N 126°30.5′W	920	0	?
Unnamed peak	48°38′N 123°56′W	920 (est.)	?	?
Nunatak Mountain	50°11.8′N 127°42.1′W	909	0	Refugium
Saxifrage Mountain		800	0	?
Doom Mountain	50°10.3′N 127°46.1′W	762	0	Refugium
Mount Finlayson	48°28′58.1″N 123°32′18.9″W	419	249	Gowlland

== See also ==
- Queen Charlotte Mountains

== Sources ==
- Philip Stone (2003). Island Alpine, A Guide to the Mountains of Strathcona Park and Vancouver Island. Wild Isle Publications: Heriot Bay, BC. ISBN 0-9680766-5-3.
- Lindsay Elms (1996). Beyond Nootka, A Historical Perspective of Vancouver Island Mountains. Misthorn Press: Courtenay, BC. ISBN 0-9680159-0-5.
