= Mount Elliott (British Columbia) =

Mountain in Canada

- Location within Vancouver Island Location within British Columbia
- Interactive map of Mount Elliott

Highest point
- Elevation: 1,557 m (5,108 ft)
- Prominence: 1,227 m (4,026 ft)
- Parent peak: Mount Ashwood (1761 m)
- Listing: Mountains of British Columbia
- Coordinates: 50°17′27″N 126°29′40″W

Geography
- Location: Vancouver Island, British Columbia, Canada
- District: Rupert Land District
- Parent range: Vancouver Island Ranges
- Topo map: NTS 92L8 Adam River

Mount Elliott is an isolated mountain on Vancouver Island, British Columbia, Canada, located 12 km (7 mi) northeast of Woss and 15 km (9 mi) northwest of Mount Abel. It contains a high treeline and minimal alpine terrain.

== See also ==
- Geography of British Columbia
