= Tsitika Mountain =

Mountain in British Columbia, Canada

- Location within Vancouver Island Location within British Columbia
- Interactive map of Tsitika Mountain

Highest point
- Elevation: 1,667 m (5,469 ft)
- Prominence: 807 m (2,648 ft)
- Coordinates: 50°25′36.1″N 126°39′06.1″W

Geography
- Location: Vancouver Island, British Columbia, Canada
- District: Rupert Land District
- Parent range: Vancouver Island Ranges
- Topo map: NTS 92L7 Nimpkish

Climbing
- First ascent: 1931 GJ Jackson survey party

Tsitika Mountain is a mountain on Vancouver Island, British Columbia, Canada, located 18 km (11 mi) southeast of Telegraph Cove and 34 km (21 mi) northwest of Mount Abel.

== See also ==
- List of mountains of Canada
