= Jagged Mountain =

Mountain in British Columbia, Canada

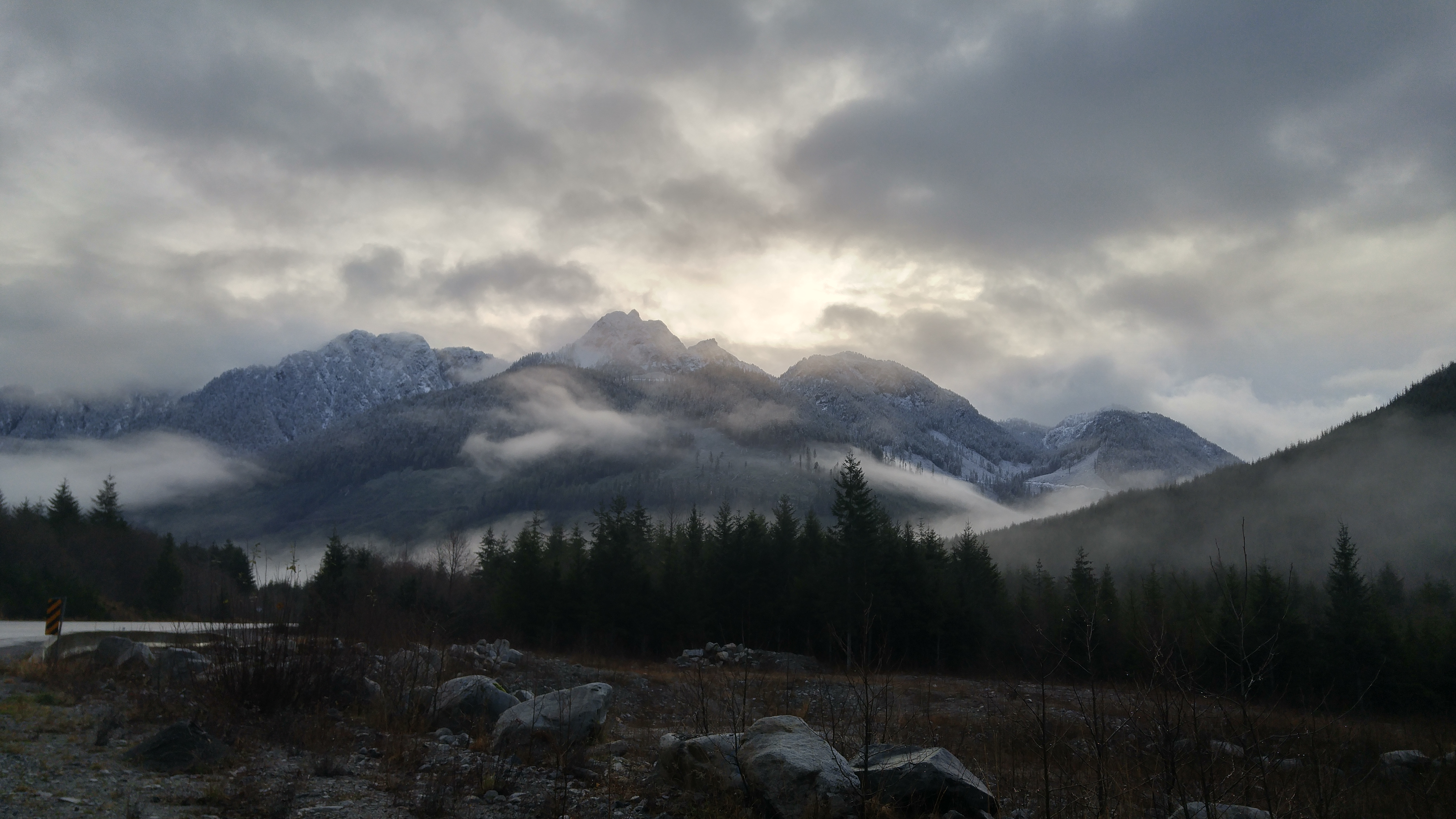
- Jagged Mountain as seen from Highway 19

Highest point
- Elevation: 1,708 m (5,604 ft)
- Prominence: 753 m (2,470 ft)
- Coordinates: 50°16′01.9″N 126°17′28.0″W

Geography
- Location within British Columbia
- Interactive map of Jagged Mountain
- Location: Vancouver Island, British Columbia, Canada
- District: Rupert Land District
- Parent range: Vancouver Island Ranges
- Topo map: NTS 92L8 Adam River

Jagged Mountain is a mountain on Vancouver Island, British Columbia, Canada, located 23 km (14 mi) east of Woss and 6 km (4 mi) north of Mount Abel.

== See also ==
- List of mountains in Canada
