= Mount Derby =

Mountain in British Columbia, Canada

- Location within Vancouver Island Location within British Columbia
- Interactive map of Mount Derby

Highest point
- Elevation: 1,658 m (5,440 ft)
- Prominence: 548 m (1,798 ft)
- Coordinates: 50°26′17.2″N 126°32′21.8″W

Geography
- Location: Vancouver Island, British Columbia, Canada
- District: Rupert Land District
- Parent range: Vancouver Island Ranges
- Topo map: NTS 92L7 Nimpkish

Climbing
- First ascent: 1931 GJ Jackson survey party

Mount Derby is a mountain on Vancouver Island, British Columbia, Canada, located 24 km (15 mi) southeast of Telegraph Cove and 14 km (9 mi) northwest of Mount Russell.

== See also ==
- List of mountains in Canada
