= Mount Juliet =

Mount Juliet may refer to:

- Mount Juliet, Tennessee, USA
- Mount Juliet Golf & Spa Hotel in Mount Juliet estate, Thomastown, County Kilkenny, Ireland
- Mount Juliet (Music City Star station), a station on Nashville's regional rail line
- Mount Juliet (British Columbia), a mountain on Vancouver Island, British Columbia, Canada
- Mount Juliet, a peak in the Yarra Ranges near Healesville, Australia
