= Mount Cain =

Mountain in British Columbia, Canada

- Location within Vancouver Island Location within British Columbia
- Interactive map of Mount Cain

Highest point
- Elevation: 1,819 m (5,968 ft)
- Prominence: 254 m (833 ft)
- Coordinates: 50°13′43.0″N 126°19′34.0″W

Geography
- Location: Vancouver Island, British Columbia, Canada
- District: Rupert Land District
- Parent range: Vancouver Island Ranges
- Topo map: NTS 92L1 Schoen Lake

Mount Cain is a mountain on Vancouver Island, British Columbia, Canada, located 20 km (12 mi) east of Woss and 2 km north of Mount Abel. The mountain is home to a local ski hill operated by the Mount Cain Alpine Park Society.

The Mount Cain ski hill is run mostly by volunteers, many of whom work in the forest industry on North Vancouver Island. "Cain", as it is called for short, is known mostly for its back-country. The hill itself has two t-bars and a rope tow.

== See also ==
- List of mountains of Canada
