= Mount Russell (British Columbia) =

Mountain on Vancouver Island, British Columbia, Canada

- Location within Vancouver Island Location within British Columbia
- Interactive map of Mount Russell

Highest point
- Elevation: 1,742 m (5,715 ft)
- Prominence: 663 m (2,175 ft)
- Parent peak: Mount Palmerston (1765 m)
- Listing: Mountains of British Columbia
- Coordinates: 50°23′05″N 126°21′47″W

Geography
- Location: Vancouver Island, British Columbia, Canada
- District: Rupert Land District
- Parent range: Vancouver Island Ranges
- Topo map: NTS 92L8 Adam River

Mount Russell is a mountain on Vancouver Island, British Columbia, Canada, located 26 km (16 mi) northeast of Woss and 3 km (2 mi) southwest of Mount Palmerston. It lies in the east headwaters of Tsitika River.

== See also ==
- Geography of British Columbia
