= Hankin Range =

Mountain range in Canada

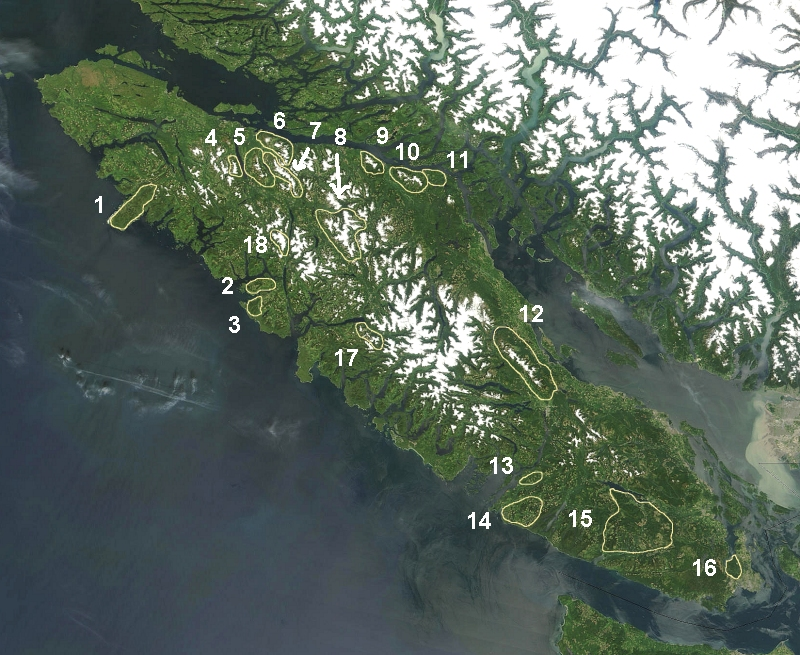
- The Hankin Range is marked 5 on map

Dimensions
- Area: 287 km^{2} (111 mi^{2})

Geography
- Location within British Columbia
- Country: Canada
- Region: British Columbia
- Range coordinates: 50°23′N 126°51′W
- Parent range: Vancouver Island Ranges

The Hankin Range is a small mountain range on Vancouver Island, British Columbia, Canada, located between Nimpkish and Bonanza Lakes. It has an area of 287 km^{2} and is a subrange of the Vancouver Island Ranges which in turn form part of the Insular Mountains.

== See also ==
- List of mountain ranges
