= Mount Thelwood =

Mountain in Canada

- Location within Vancouver Island Location within British Columbia
- Interactive map of Mount Thelwood

Highest point
- Elevation: 1,742 m (5,715 ft)
- Prominence: 397 m (1,302 ft)
- Coordinates: 49°32′20.0″N 125°43′58.1″W

Geography
- Location: Vancouver Island, British Columbia, Canada
- District: Clayoquot Land District
- Parent range: Vancouver Island Ranges
- Topo map: NTS 92F12 Buttle Lake

Mount Thelwood is a mountain on Vancouver Island, British Columbia, Canada, located 35 km (22 mi) southeast of Gold River and 9 km (6 mi) west of Mount Myra.

== See also ==
- List of mountains of Canada
