= Warden Peak =

Mountain in British Columbia, Canada

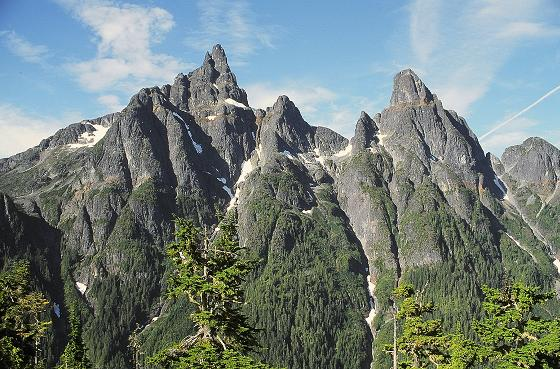
- Victoria Peak on the left and Warden Peak on the right

Highest point
- Elevation: 1,970 m (6,460 ft)
- Prominence: 265 m (869 ft)
- Listing: Mountains of British Columbia
- Coordinates: 50°03′43″N 126°05′46″W

Geography
- Location within Vancouver Island Location within British Columbia
- Interactive map of Warden Peak
- Location: Vancouver Island, British Columbia, Canada
- District: Rupert Land District
- Parent range: Vancouver Island Ranges
- Topo map: NTS 92L1 Schoen Lake

Climbing
- First ascent: 1968 Pat Guilbride; Peter Perfect; K. Pfeiffer

Warden Peak is a mountain on Vancouver Island, British Columbia, Canada, located 31 km (19.3 mi) north of Gold River and 1 km (0.62 mi) north of Victoria Peak.

Warden Peak is part of the Vancouver Island Ranges which in turn form part of the Insular Mountains.

== See also ==
- Geography of British Columbia
