= Mount Phillips (Vancouver Island) =

Mountain in British Columbia, Canada

- Location within Vancouver Island Location within British Columbia
- Interactive map of Mount Phillips

Highest point
- Elevation: 1,722 m (5,650 ft)
- Prominence: 500 m (1,600 ft)
- Coordinates: 49°37′13.1″N 125°34′44.1″W

Geography
- Location: Vancouver Island, British Columbia, Canada
- District: Nootka Land District
- Parent range: Vancouver Island Ranges
- Topo map: NTS 92F12 Buttle Lake

Mount Phillips is a mountain on Vancouver Island, British Columbia, Canada, located 38 km (24 mi) southeast of Gold River and 12 km (7 mi) southeast of Mount McBride.

== See also ==
- Phillips Ridge
- List of mountains of Canada
