= Hapush Mountain =

Mountain in British Columbia, Canada

- Location within Vancouver Island Location within British Columbia
- Interactive map of Hapush Mountain

Highest point
- Elevation: 1,761 m (5,778 ft)
- Prominence: 256 m (840 ft)
- Coordinates: 50°14′34.0″N 126°20′01.0″W

Geography
- Location: Vancouver Island, British Columbia, Canada
- District: Rupert Land District
- Parent range: Vancouver Island Ranges
- Topo map: NTS 92L1 Schoen Lake

Hapush Mountain is a long narrow mountain on Vancouver Island, British Columbia, Canada, located 19 km (12 mi) east of Woss and 4 km (2 mi) north of Mount Abel.

== See also ==
- List of mountains of Canada
