= Mount Cobb =

Mount Cobb is the name of several places:

In Australia

- Mount Cobb (Australia), a mountain in South Australia

In Canada

- Mount Cobb (British Columbia), a mountain on Vancouver Island

In New Zealand

- Mount Cobb, New Zealand, a mountain in the Tasman Region

In the United States

- Mount Cobb, Pennsylvania, a township in Lackawanna County
- Mount Cobb (Vermont), a mountain in Washington County
