= Zeballos Peak =

Mountain in British Columbia, Canada

- Location within Vancouver Island Location within British Columbia
- Interactive map of Zeballos Peak

Highest point
- Elevation: 1,578 m (5,177 ft)
- Prominence: 953 m (3,127 ft)
- Coordinates: 50°05′48.0″N 126°46′08.0″W

Geography
- Location: Vancouver Island, British Columbia, Canada
- District: Rupert Land District
- Parent range: Vancouver Island Ranges
- Topo map: NTS 92L2 Woss Lake

Zeballos Peak, formerly known as Zeballos Mountain, is a mountain on Vancouver Island, British Columbia, Canada, located 14 km (9 mi) northeast of Zeballos and 10 km (6 mi) northwest of Rugged Mountain.

== See also ==
- List of mountains of Canada
