= Mount McKelvie =

Mountain in British Columbia, Canada

- Location within Vancouver Island Location within British Columbia Location within Canada
- Interactive map of Mount McKelvie

Highest point
- Elevation: 1,621 m (5,318 ft)
- Prominence: 1,099 m (3,606 ft)
- Coordinates: 49°59′17.2″N 126°34′50.9″W

Geography
- Location: Vancouver Island, British Columbia, Canada
- District: Nootka Land District
- Parent range: Vancouver Island Ranges
- Topo map: NTS 92E15 Zeballos

Mount McKelvie is a mountain on Vancouver Island, British Columbia, Canada, 10 km (6 mi) northeast of Tahsis and 13 km (8 mi) northwest of Mount Bate.

== See also ==
- List of mountains in Canada
