= Hkusam Mountain =

Mountain in British Columbia, Canada

- Location within Vancouver Island Location within British Columbia
- Interactive map of Hkusam Mountain

Highest point
- Elevation: 1,671 m (5,482 ft)
- Prominence: 1,534 m (5,033 ft)
- Listing: Mountains of British Columbia; Canada prominent peaks 138th
- Coordinates: 50°20′05″N 125°50′27″W

Naming
- Pronunciation: /ˈkuːsəm/ KOO-səm

Geography
- Location: Vancouver Island, British Columbia, Canada
- District: Sayward Land District
- Parent range: Prince of Wales Range
- Topo map: NTS 92K5 Sayward

Hkusam Mountain is a mountain on the northeast coast of Vancouver Island, British Columbia, Canada, located 10 km (6 mi) southeast of Sayward and 36 km (22 mi) northeast of Victoria Peak.

The name of the mountain is derived from the Kʼómoks word for "having fat or oil", probably a reference to the proximity of the Salmon River.

== See also ==
- Geography of British Columbia
