= Watchtower Peak =

Mountain on Vancouver Island, British Columbia, Canada

- Location within Vancouver Island Location within British Columbia
- Interactive map of Watchtower Peak

Highest point
- Elevation: 1,748 m (5,735 ft)
- Prominence: 543 m (1,781 ft)
- Coordinates: 50°05′13.9″N 126°13′37.9″W

Geography
- Location: Vancouver Island, British Columbia, Canada
- District: Rupert Land District
- Parent range: Sutton Range
- Topo map: NTS 92L1 Schoen Lake

Climbing
- First ascent: 1975 J. Gibson Syd Watts

Watchtower Peak is a long mountain ridge on Vancouver Island, British Columbia, Canada, located 30 km (19 mi) southeast of Woss and 8 km (5 mi) east of Maquilla Peak.

The first ascent of Watchtower Peak was in 1975 by J. Gibson Syd Watts.

== See also ==
- List of mountains of Canada
