= Queen Peak =

Mountain in British Columbia, Canada

Highest point
- Elevation: 1,639 m (5,377 ft)
- Prominence: 754 m (2,474 ft)
- Coordinates: 50°02′55.0″N 126°03′14.0″W

Geography
- Location: Vancouver Island, British Columbia, Canada
- Parent range: Vancouver Island Ranges
- Topo map: NTS 92L1 Schoen Lake

Queen Peak is a mountain on Vancouver Island, British Columbia, Canada, located 30 km (19 mi) north of Gold River and 3 km (2 mi) east of Victoria Peak.

== See also ==
- List of mountains in Canada
- Royal eponyms in Canada
