= Mount Palmerston =

Mountain in Canada

- Location within Vancouver Island Location within British Columbia
- Interactive map of Mount Palmerston

Highest point
- Elevation: 1,765 m (5,791 ft)
- Prominence: 1,219 m (3,999 ft)
- Coordinates: 50°24′27.0″N 126°20′13.9″W

Geography
- Location: Vancouver Island, British Columbia, Canada
- District: Rupert Land District
- Parent range: Vancouver Island Ranges
- Topo map: NTS 92L8 Adam River

Mount Palmerston is a mountain on Vancouver Island, British Columbia, Canada, located 26 km (16 mi) west of Sayward and 22 km (14 mi) north of Mount Abel.

== See also ==
- List of mountains of Canada
