= Eden Mountain =

Mountain in British Columbia, Canada

- Location within Vancouver Island Location within British Columbia
- Interactive map of Eden Mountain

Highest point
- Elevation: 1,641 m (5,384 ft)
- Prominence: 731 m (2,398 ft)
- Coordinates: 50°14′11.0″N 126°14′52.1″W

Geography
- Location: Vancouver Island, British Columbia, Canada
- District: Rupert Land District
- Parent range: Vancouver Island Ranges
- Topo map: NTS 92L1 Schoen Lake

Eden Mountain is a mountain on Vancouver Island, British Columbia, Canada, located 25 km (16 mi) east of Woss and 4 km (2 mi) southwest of Mount Romeo.

== See also ==
- List of mountains of Canada
