= Moyeha Mountain =

Mountain in Canada

- Location within Vancouver Island Location within British Columbia
- Interactive map of Moyeha Mountain

Highest point
- Elevation: 1,791 m (5,876 ft)
- Prominence: 661 m (2,169 ft)
- Coordinates: 49°31′00.8″N 125°44′20.0″W

Geography
- Location: Vancouver Island, British Columbia, Canada
- District: Clayoquot Land District
- Parent range: Vancouver Island Ranges
- Topo map: NTS 92F12 Buttle Lake

Moyeha Mountain is a mountain on Vancouver Island, British Columbia, Canada, located 37 km (23 mi) southeast of Gold River and 10 km (6 mi) west of Mount Myra.

== See also ==
- List of mountains of Canada
