= Whiltilla Mountain =

Mountain in British Columbia, Canada

- Location within Vancouver Island Location within British Columbia
- Interactive map of Whiltilla Mountain

Highest point
- Elevation: 1,697 m (5,568 ft)
- Prominence: 215 m (705 ft)
- Coordinates: 50°21′59.0″N 126°42′20.9″W

Geography
- Location: Vancouver Island, British Columbia, Canada
- District: Rupert Land District
- Parent range: Bonanza Range
- Topo map: NTS 92L7 Nimpkish

Whiltilla Mountain is a mountain on Vancouver Island, British Columbia, Canada, located 16 km (10 mi) east of Nimpkish.

== See also ==
- List of mountains of Canada
