= Mount Juliet (British Columbia) =

Mountain in Canada

- Location within Vancouver Island Location within British Columbia
- Interactive map of Mount Juliet

Highest point
- Elevation: 1,626 m (5,335 ft)
- Prominence: 561 m (1,841 ft)
- Coordinates: 50°15′29.2″N 126°10′15.9″W

Geography
- Location: Vancouver Island, British Columbia, Canada
- District: Rupert Land District
- Parent range: Vancouver Island Ranges
- Topo map: NTS 92L8 Adam River

Mount Juliet is a mountain on Vancouver Island, British Columbia, Canada, located 20 km (12 mi) southwest of Sayward and 3 km (2 mi) east of Mount Romeo.

== See also ==
- List of mountains of Canada
