= Mount Nora =

Mountain in Canada

- Location within Vancouver Island Location within British Columbia
- Interactive map of Mount Nora

Highest point
- Elevation: 1,684 m (5,525 ft)
- Prominence: 1,026 m (3,366 ft)
- Coordinates: 50°09′15.1″N 126°06′50.0″W

Geography
- Location: Vancouver Island, British Columbia, Canada
- District: Rupert Land District
- Parent range: Vancouver Island Ranges
- Topo map: NTS 92L1 Schoen Lake

Climbing
- First ascent: 2002 FRA Lindsay Elms

Mount Nora is a mountain on Vancouver Island, British Columbia, Canada, located 27 km (17 mi) south of Sayward and 15 km (9 mi) northeast of Sutton Peak.

== See also ==
- List of mountains of Canada
