= Newcastle Ridge =

Mountain ridge in British Columbia, Canada

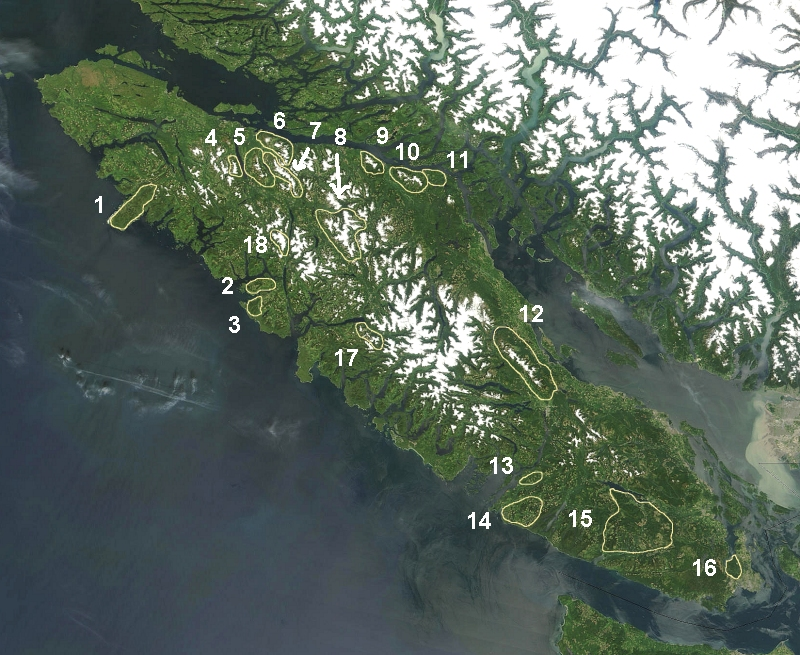
- The Newcastle Ridge is marked 9 on map

Highest point
- Coordinates: 50°23′07.1″N 126°01′45.1″W

Geography
- Location within British Columbia
- Country: Canada
- Region: British Columbia
- Parent range: Vancouver Island Ranges

The Newcastle Ridge is a mountain ridge on Vancouver Island, British Columbia, Canada, located on the south side of Johnstone Strait between Adam River and Sayward. It is part of the Vancouver Island Ranges which in turn form part of the Insular Mountains.

The highest peak of the ridge is unofficially named Newcastle Peak at 1,333 m (4,373 ft).

== See also ==
- List of mountain ranges
