= Mount Alston =

Mountain in British Columbia, Canada

- Location within Vancouver Island Location within British Columbia
- Interactive map of Mount Alston

Highest point
- Elevation: 1,759 m (5,771 ft)
- Prominence: 674 m (2,211 ft)
- Coordinates: 50°01′00.8″N 126°13′31.1″W

Geography
- Location: Vancouver Island, British Columbia, Canada
- District: Rupert Land District
- Parent range: Sutton Range
- Topo map: NTS 92L1 Schoen Lake

Mount Alston is a mountain on Vancouver Island, British Columbia, Canada, 29 km (18 mi) east of Gold River and 3 km (2 mi) south of Sutton Peak. The source of the Nimpkish River is on the west slope of Mount Alston, 700 metres from its summit.

== See also ==
- List of mountains in Canada
