= Maquilla =

Maquilla may refer to:

- Maquinna, a chief of the Nuu-chah-nulth people
- Maquilla Peak, a mountain in Canada
