= Mount Adrian =

Mountain in the country of Canada

- Location within Vancouver Island Location within British Columbia
- Interactive map of Mount Adrian

Highest point
- Elevation: 1,870 m (6,140 ft)
- Prominence: 569 m (1,867 ft)
- Listing: Mountains of British Columbia
- Coordinates: 49°45′23.0″N 125°31′45.9″W

Geography
- Location: Vancouver Island, British Columbia, Canada
- District: Comox Land District
- Parent range: Vancouver Island Ranges
- Topo map: NTS 92F13 Upper Campbell Lake

Mount Adrian is a mountain on Vancouver Island, British Columbia, Canada, located 35 km (22 mi) southwest of Campbell River and 3 km (2 mi) northwest of Alexandra Peak.
