= Mount Donner =

Mountain in British Columbia, Canada

- Location within Vancouver Island Location within British Columbia
- Interactive map of Mount Donner

Highest point
- Elevation: 1,802 m (5,912 ft)
- Prominence: 277 m (909 ft)
- Coordinates: 49°41′24.0″N 125°53′31.9″W

Geography
- Location: Vancouver Island, British Columbia, Canada
- District: Nootka Land District
- Parent range: Vancouver Island Ranges
- Topo map: NTS 92F12 Buttle Lake

Mount Donner is a mountain on Vancouver Island, British Columbia, Canada, located 15 km (9 mi) southeast of Gold River and 2 km (1 mi) north of Mount Kent-Urquhart.

== See also ==
- List of mountains in Canada
