= Mount Romeo =

Mountain in Canada

- Location within Vancouver Island Location within British Columbia
- Interactive map of Mount Romeo

Highest point
- Elevation: 1,663 m (5,456 ft)
- Prominence: 1,038 m (3,406 ft)
- Coordinates: 50°15′33.8″N 126°12′29.2″W

Geography
- Location: Vancouver Island, British Columbia, Canada
- District: Rupert Land District
- Parent range: Vancouver Island Ranges
- Topo map: NTS 92L8 Adam River

Mount Romeo is a mountain on Vancouver Island, British Columbia, Canada, located 22 km (14 mi) southwest of Sayward and 10 km (6 mi) northeast of Mount Abel.

== See also ==
- List of mountains of Canada
