= Tyee Mountain =

Mountain on Vancouver Island, British Columbia, Canada

- Location within Vancouver Island Location within British Columbia
- Interactive map of Tyee Mountain

Highest point
- Elevation: 1,666 m (5,466 ft)
- Prominence: 536 m (1,759 ft)
- Coordinates: 49°58′45.8″N 125°53′39.1″W

Geography
- Location: Vancouver Island, British Columbia, Canada
- District: Nootka Land District
- Parent range: Vancouver Island Ranges
- Topo map: NTS 92F13 Upper Campbell Lake

Tyee Mountain is a mountain on Vancouver Island, British Columbia, Canada, located 25 km (16 mi) northeast of Gold River and 5 km (3 mi) northeast of Mount Judson, between the head of the Gold River and the Salmon River, at the northwest end of Strathcona Provincial Park. "Tyee", which also means "big" and "chief" or "chiefly in the Chinook Jargon, was applied here in its sense of "big" (i.e. the bigger or biggest one).

== See also ==
- List of mountains in Canada
- List of Chinook Jargon placenames
