= Karmutzen Range =

Mountain range in Canada

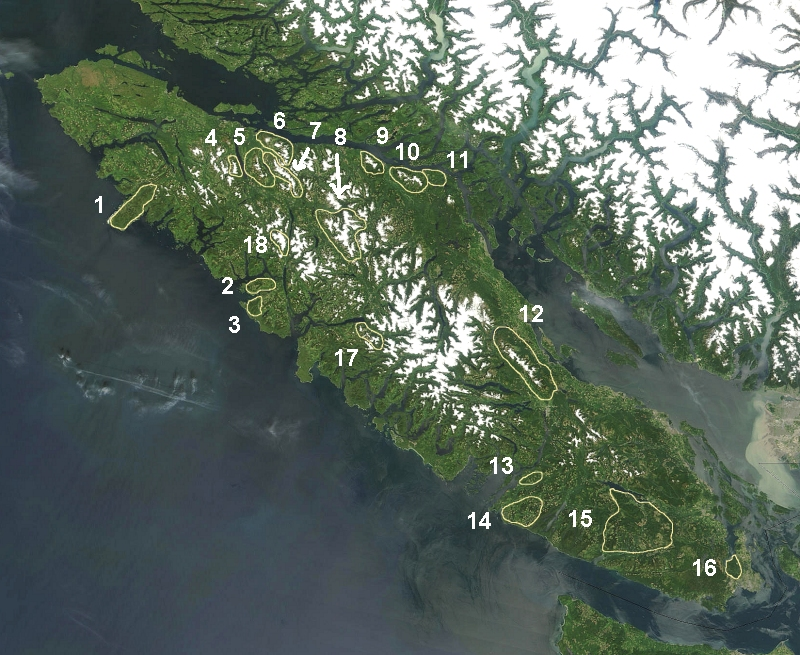
- The Karmutzen Range is marked 4 on map

Dimensions
- Area: 64 km^{2} (25 mi^{2})

Geography
- Location within British Columbia
- Country: Canada
- Region: British Columbia
- Range coordinates: 50°22′48″N 127°00′46″W
- Parent range: Vancouver Island Ranges

The Karmutzen Range, formerly gazetted as the Karmutsen Range, is a small mountain range in British Columbia, Canada, located west of Nimpkish Lake on Vancouver Island, north of Tlakwa Creek and south and east of Karmuzten Creek. It has an area of 64 km^{2} (25 mi^{2}) and is a subrange of the Vancouver Island Ranges which in turn form part of the Insular Mountains.

== See also ==
- List of mountain ranges
