= Puzzle Mountain =

Mountain in British Columbia, Canada

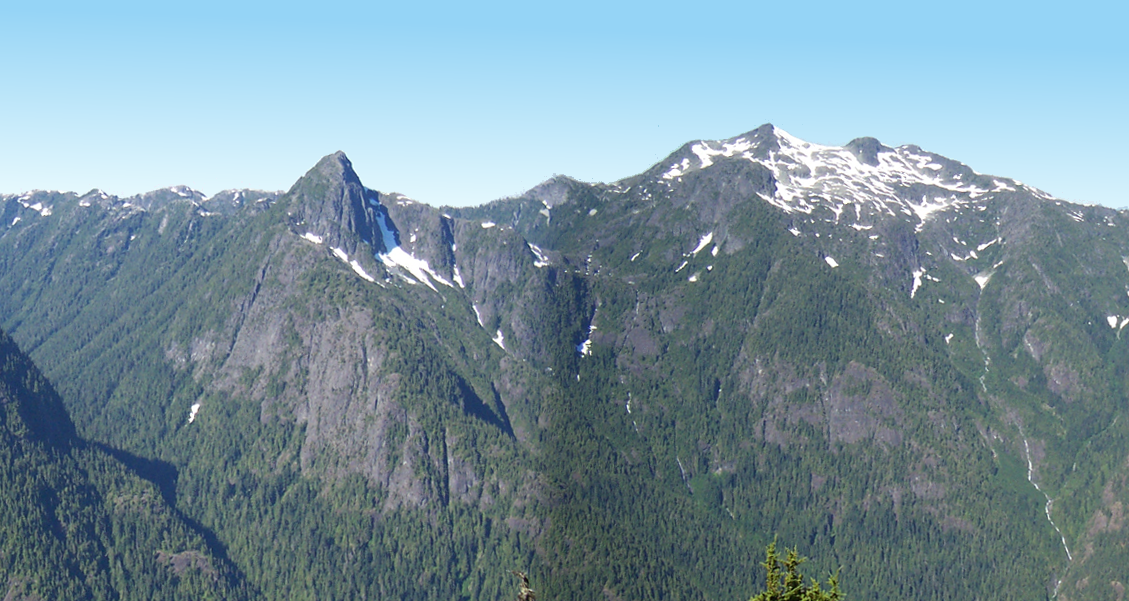
- Puzzle Mountain's East aspect (right)

Highest point
- Elevation: 1,825 m (5,988 ft)
- Prominence: 815 m (2,674 ft)
- Coordinates: 49°47′26.2″N 125°54′56.2″W

Geography
- Location within Vancouver Island Location within British Columbia
- Interactive map of Puzzle Mountain
- Location: Vancouver Island, British Columbia, Canada
- District: Nootka Land District
- Parent range: Elk River Mountains
- Topo map: NTS 92F13 Upper Campbell Lake

Climbing
- First ascent: 1912 R.W. Kent; W.W. Urquhart

Puzzle Mountain is a twin-summit mountain on Vancouver Island, British Columbia, Canada, located 9 km (6 mi) east of Gold River and 6 km (4 mi) northwest of Mount Colonel Foster. It is named for the maze of snow patches on its northeast face.

== See also ==
- List of mountains in Canada
