= Mount Cokely =

Mountain in British Columbia, Canada

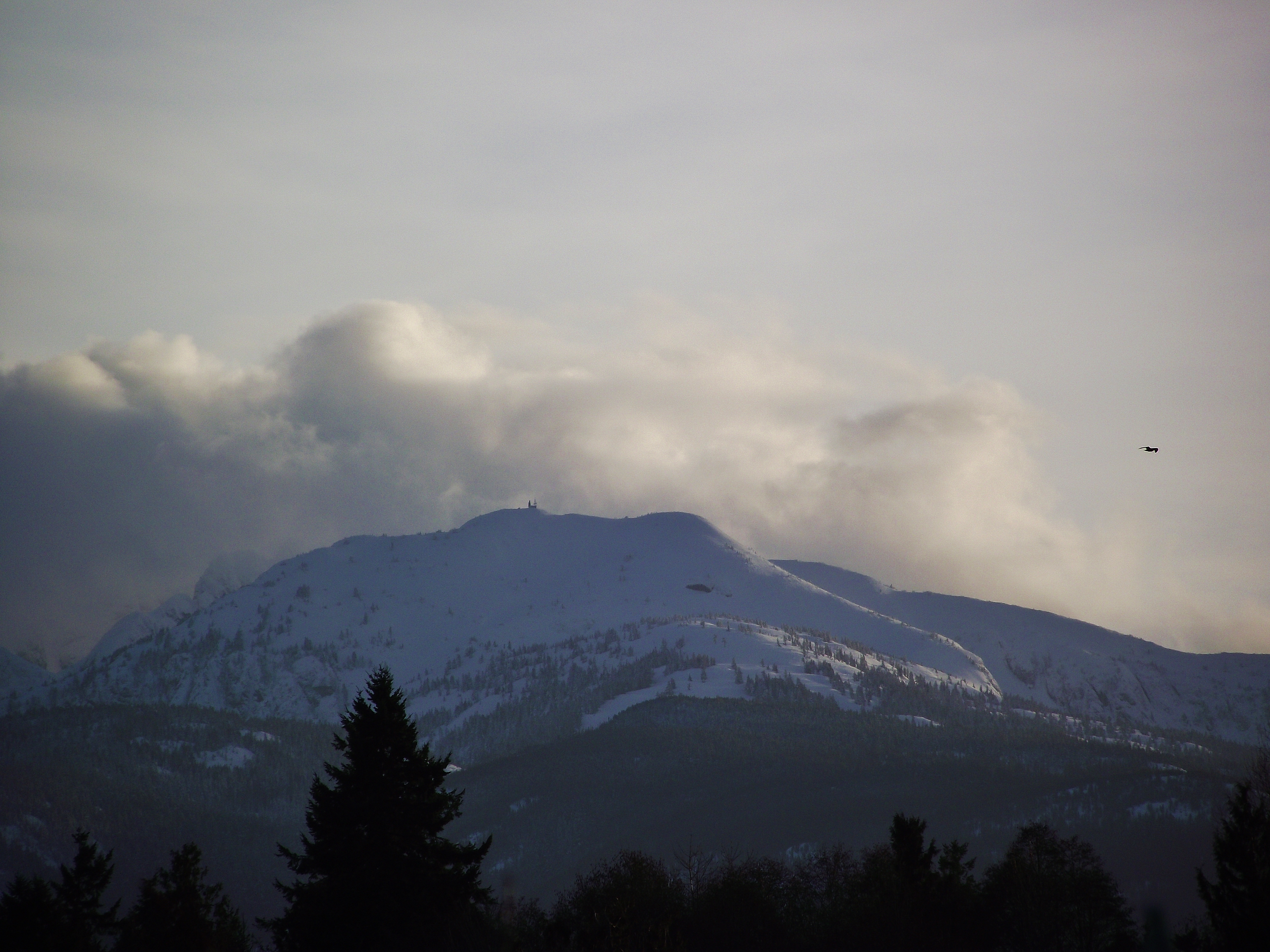
- Mount Cokely, British Columbia, Canada

Highest point
- Elevation: 1,619 m (5,312 ft)
- Prominence: 127 m (417 ft)
- Coordinates: 49°14′21.8″N 124°35′12.1″W

Geography
- Location within British Columbia
- Interactive map of Mount Cokely
- Location: Vancouver Island, British Columbia, Canada
- District: Cameron Land District
- Parent range: Vancouver Island Ranges
- Topo map: NTS 92L2 Woss Lake

Mount Cokely, formerly known as The Hump and at times misspelled in some sources as Mount Copely and Mount Coakely, is a mountain on Vancouver Island, British Columbia, Canada, located 16 km (10 mi) east of Port Alberni and 2 km (1 mi) north of Mount Arrowsmith in Cameron Land District. The peak was named for Sterling Cokely (1884–1956), a British Columbia Land Surveyor.

== See also ==
- List of mountains in Canada
