= Genevieve Range =

Mountain range in Canada

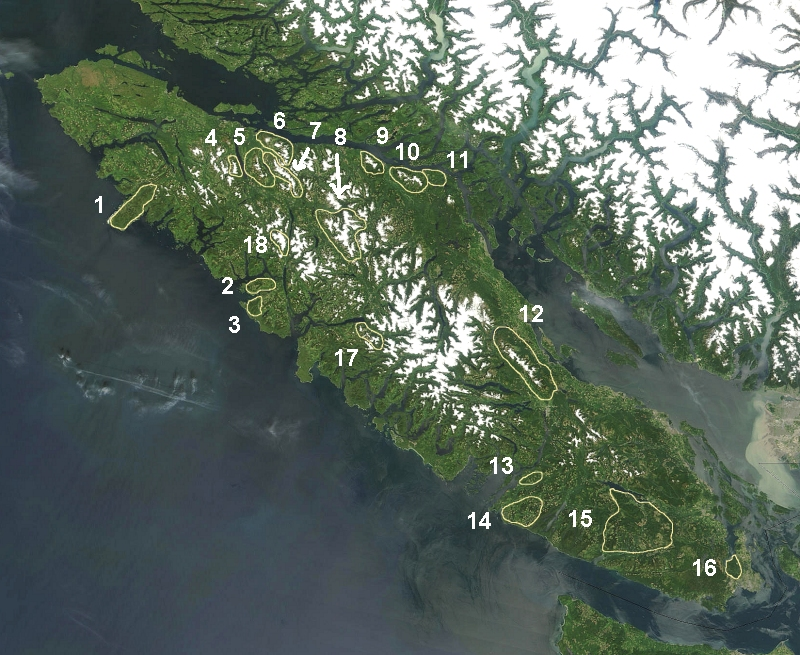
- The Genevieve Range is marked 3 on map

Dimensions
- Area: 101 km^{2} (39 mi^{2})

Geography
- Location within British Columbia
- Country: Canada
- Region: British Columbia
- Range coordinates: 49°45′N 126°51′W
- Parent range: Vancouver Island Ranges

The Genevieve Range is a low, small mountain range on western Nootka Island, which is on the western side of Nootka Sound, British Columbia, Canada. It consists of hills and has an area of 101 km^{2} and is a subrange of the Vancouver Island Ranges which in turn form part of the Insular Mountains.

== See also ==
- List of mountain ranges
