= Halifax Range =

Mountain range in British Columbia, Canada

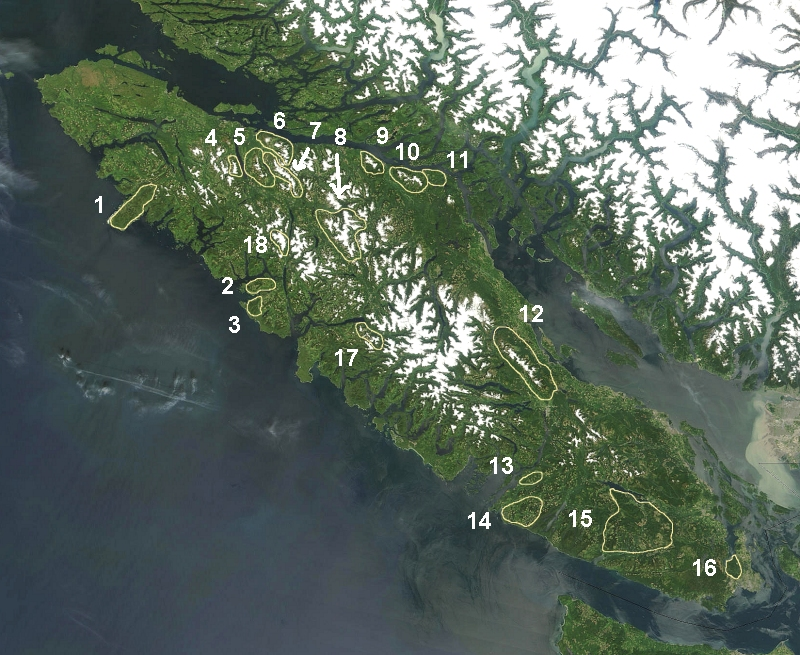
- Halifax Range is marked 11 on map

Dimensions
- Area: 51 km^{2} (20 mi^{2})

Geography
- Location within British Columbia
- Country: Canada
- Region: British Columbia
- Range coordinates: 50°20′55″N 125°35′34″W
- Parent range: Vancouver Island Ranges

The Halifax Range is a small mountain range on Vancouver Island, British Columbia, Canada, adjacent to Johnstone Strait, between Amor de Cosmos Creek and Pye Creek. It consists of hills and has an area of 51 km^{2} and is a subrange of the Vancouver Island Ranges which in turn form part of the Insular Mountains.

== See also ==
- List of mountain ranges
