= Mount Haig-Brown =

Mountain in British Columbia, Canada

- Location within Vancouver Island Location within British Columbia
- Interactive map of Mount Haig-Brown

Highest point
- Elevation: 1,948 m (6,391 ft)
- Prominence: 216 m (709 ft)
- Coordinates: 49°46′23.0″N 125°44′19.0″W

Geography
- Location: Vancouver Island, British Columbia, Canada
- District: Nootka Land District
- Parent range: Vancouver Island Ranges
- Topo map: NTS 92E16 Gold River

Mount Haig-Brown is a mountain on Vancouver Island, British Columbia, Canada, located 22 km (14 mi) east of Gold River and 4 km (2 mi) south of Mount Filberg. The peak, at the north end of Buttle Lake, commemorates noted author and conservationist Roderick Haig-Brown and his wife Anne.

== See also ==
- List of mountains of Canada
