= Kokummi Mountain =

Mountain on Vancouver Island, British Columbia, Canada

- Location within Vancouver Island Location within British Columbia
- Interactive map of Kokummi Mountain

Highest point
- Elevation: 1,615 m (5,299 ft)
- Prominence: 466 m (1,529 ft)
- Coordinates: 50°05′55.0″N 126°08′22.9″W

Geography
- Location: Vancouver Island, British Columbia, Canada
- District: Rupert Land District
- Parent range: Sutton Range
- Topo map: NTS 92L1 Schoen Lake

Kokummi Mountain is a mountain on Vancouver Island, British Columbia, Canada, located 34 km (21 mi) south of Sayward and 9 km (6 mi) southeast of Mount Schoen.

== See also ==
- List of mountains of Canada
