= Sophia Range =

Mountain range in Canada

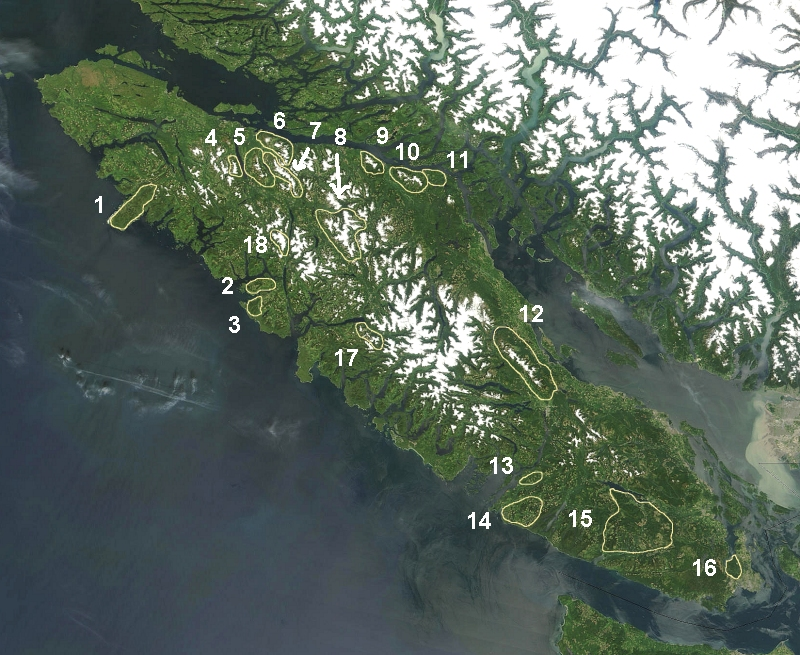
- The Sophia Range is marked 2 on map

Dimensions
- Area: 150 km^{2} (58 mi^{2})

Geography
- Location within British Columbia
- Country: Canada
- Region: British Columbia
- Range coordinates: 49°49′N 126°51′W
- Parent range: Vancouver Island Ranges

The Sophia Range is a low, small mountain range on southern Nootka Island, forming a peninsula west of Tahsis Inlet, between Esperanza Inlet and Nuchatlitz Inlet, British Columbia, Canada. It is made up of hills and has an area of 150 km^{2} and is a subrange of the Vancouver Island Ranges which in turn form part of the Insular Mountains.

In the 1850s five daughters of Captain Edward E. Langford were the belles of Victoria. Captain George H. Richards named this range after Sophia Elizabeth, the fourth daughter of Langford.

== See also ==
- List of mountain ranges
