= Trio Mountain =

- Location within Vancouver Island Location within British Columbia
- Interactive map of Trio Mountain

Highest point
- Elevation: 1,731 m (5,679 ft)
- Prominence: 913 m (2,995 ft)
- Coordinates: 49°52′45.8″N 126°00′11.9″W

Geography
- Location: Vancouver Island, British Columbia, Canada
- District: Nootka Land District
- Parent range: Vancouver Island Ranges
- Topo map: NTS 92E16 Gold River

Trio Mountain is a mountain on Vancouver Island, British Columbia, Canada, located 11 km (7 mi) north of Gold River and 15 km (9 mi) southwest of Crown Mountain.

== See also ==
- List of mountains in Canada
