= Mount DeVoe =

Mountain in Canada

- Location within Vancouver Island Location within British Columbia
- Interactive map of Mount DeVoe

Highest point
- Elevation: 1,737 m (5,699 ft)
- Prominence: 572 m (1,877 ft)
- Coordinates: 49°41′33.0″N 125°48′24.0″W

Geography
- Location: Vancouver Island, British Columbia, Canada
- District: Nootka Land District
- Parent range: Vancouver Island Ranges
- Topo map: NTS 92F12 Buttle Lake

Mount DeVoe is a mountain on Vancouver Island, British Columbia, Canada, located 20 km (12 mi) southeast of Gold River and 5 km (3 mi) south of Rambler Peak.

== See also ==
- List of mountains in Canada
