= Mariner Mountain =

West coastal mountain

- Location within Vancouver Island Location within British Columbia
- Interactive map of Mariner Mountain

Highest point
- Elevation: 1,771 m (5,810 ft)
- Prominence: 893 m (2,930 ft)
- Coordinates: 49°27′36.0″N 125°45′47.0″W

Geography
- Location: Vancouver Island, British Columbia, Canada
- District: Clayoquot Land District
- Parent range: Vancouver Island Ranges
- Topo map: NTS 92F5 Bedwell River

Mariner Mountain is a mountain on the west coast of Vancouver Island, British Columbia, Canada, located 36 km (22 mi) north of Tofino and 34 km (21 mi) southwest of Mount Albert Edward.

== See also ==
- List of mountains in Canada
