= Mount McQuillan =

Mountain in British Columbia, Canada

- Location within Vancouver Island Location within British Columbia
- Interactive map of Mount McQuillan

Highest point
- Elevation: 1,575 m (5,167 ft)
- Prominence: 885 m (2,904 ft)
- Coordinates: 49°06′33.8″N 124°36′18.0″W

Geography
- Location: Vancouver Island, British Columbia, Canada
- District: Dunsmuir Land District
- Parent range: Vancouver Island Ranges
- Topo map: NTS 92F2 Alberni Inlet

Mount McQuillan is a mountain on Vancouver Island, British Columbia, Canada, located 21 km (13 mi) southeast of Port Alberni and 13 km (8 mi) south of Mount Arrowsmith.

== See also ==
- List of mountains in Canada
