= Gowlland Range =

Mountain range in British Columbia, Canada

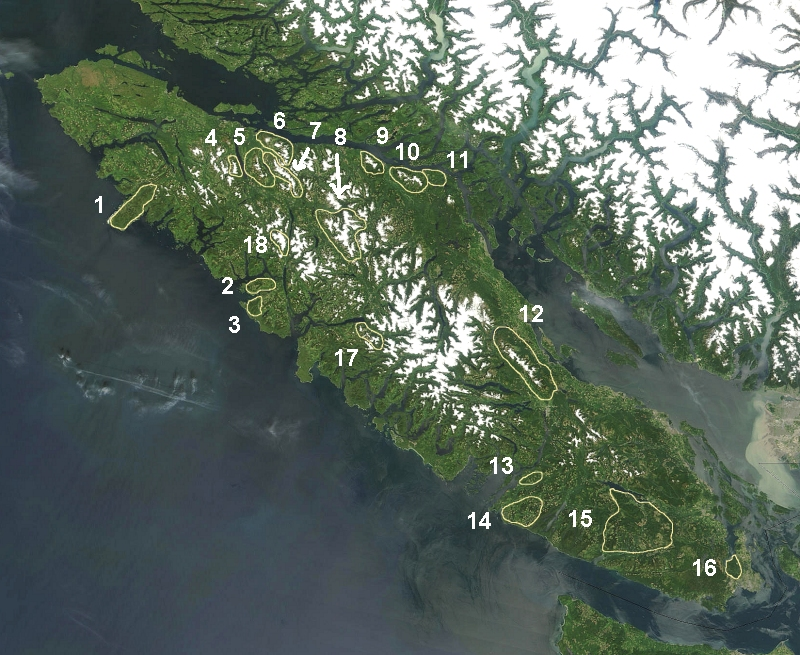
- The Gowlland Range is marked 16 on map

Dimensions
- Area: 58 km^{2} (22 mi^{2})

Geography
- Location within British Columbia
- Country: Canada
- Region: British Columbia
- Range coordinates: 48°31.85′N 123°31.7′W
- Parent range: Vancouver Island Ranges

The Gowlland Range is a low, small mountain range on southern Vancouver Island, British Columbia, Canada, located just east of Saanich Inlet and south of Brentwood Bay. It has an area of 58 km^{2} (22 sq mi) and is a subrange of the Vancouver Island Ranges which in turn form part of the Insular Mountains. The range's highest peak is Mt. Work.

== See also ==
- List of mountain ranges
