= Mount Regan =

Mount Regan can refer to the following mountains:

- Mount Regan (British Columbia)
- Mount Regan (Idaho)
