= Phillips Ridge =

- Location within Vancouver Island Location within British Columbia
- Interactive map of Phillips Ridge

Highest point
- Elevation: 1,730 m (5,680 ft)
- Prominence: 948 m (3,110 ft)
- Coordinates: 49°35′48.8″N 125°40′50.2″W

Geography
- Location: Vancouver Island, British Columbia, Canada
- District: Clayoquot Land District
- Parent range: Vancouver Island Ranges
- Topo map: NTS 92F12 Buttle Lake

Phillips Ridge is a mountain in central Vancouver Island, British Columbia, Canada, located 33 km (21 mi) southeast of Gold River.

== See also ==
- List of mountains in Canada
