= Mount Adam (British Columbia) =

Mountain in British Columbia, Canada

- Location within Vancouver Island Location within British Columbia
- Interactive map of Mount Adam

Highest point
- Elevation: 1,729 m (5,673 ft)
- Prominence: 364 m (1,194 ft)
- Coordinates: 50°07′14.2″N 126°13′22.1″W

Geography
- Location: Vancouver Island, British Columbia, Canada
- District: Rupert Land District
- Parent range: Vancouver Island Ranges
- Topo map: NTS 92L1 Schoen Lake

Climbing
- First ascent: 1932 AJ Campbell survey party

Mount Adam is a mountain on Vancouver Island, British Columbia, Canada, located 29 km (18 mi) east of Woss and 4 km (2 mi) south of Mount Schoen.

== See also ==
- List of mountains of Canada
