= Mount Ashwood =

Mountain in British Columbia, Canada

- Location within Vancouver Island Location within British Columbia
- Interactive map of Mount Ashwood

Highest point
- Elevation: 1,761 m (5,778 ft)
- Prominence: 496 m (1,627 ft)
- Coordinates: 50°18′34.9″N 126°36′13.0″W

Geography
- Location: Vancouver Island, British Columbia, Canada
- District: Rupert Land District
- Parent range: Bonanza Range
- Topo map: NTS 92L7 Nimpkish

Mount Ashwood is a mountain on Vancouver Island, British Columbia, Canada, located 11 km (7 mi) north of Woss.

== See also ==
- List of mountains of Canada
