= Big Baldy Mountain (Vancouver Island, British Columbia) =

Mountain in British Columbia, Canada

- Location within British Columbia
- Interactive map of Big Baldy Mountain

Highest point
- Elevation: 1,618 m (5,308 ft)
- Prominence: 1,021 m (3,350 ft)
- Coordinates: 49°45′38.2″N 126°08′01.0″W

Geography
- Location: Vancouver Island, British Columbia, Canada
- District: Nootka Land District
- Parent range: Vancouver Island Ranges
- Topo map: NTS 92E16 Gold River

Big Baldy Mountain is a mountain on Vancouver Island, British Columbia, Canada, located 7 km (4 mi) west of Gold River and 28 km (17 mi) southeast of Mount Bate.

== See also ==
- List of mountains of Canada
