= Mount Laing =

Mountain in British Columbia, Canada

- Location within Vancouver Island Location within British Columbia
- Interactive map of Mount Laing

Highest point
- Elevation: 1,822 m (5,978 ft)
- Prominence: 257 m (843 ft)
- Coordinates: 49°49′27.1″N 125°42′24.1″W

Geography
- Location: Vancouver Island, British Columbia, Canada
- District: Nootka Land District
- Parent range: Vancouver Island Ranges
- Topo map: NTS 92F13 Upper Campbell Lake

Mount Laing is a mountain on Vancouver Island, British Columbia, Canada, located 25 km (16 mi) east of Gold River and 2 km (1 mi) northeast of Mount Filberg.

== See also ==
- List of mountains of Canada
