= Mount Wolfenden =

Mountain in British Columbia, Canada

Coordinates: 50.4272°N 127.5664°W

Mount Wolfenden is a mountain in the Vancouver Island Ranges of British Columbia. Its elevation is 1,278 metres (4,193 ft).

It was named for Lieutenant-Colonel Richard Wolfenden who arrived in 1859 as one of Colonel Moody's Royal Engineers. He remained after they disbanded and became King's Printer in Victoria.
