= Kings Peak (British Columbia) =

Mountain on Vancouver Island, British Columbia, Canada

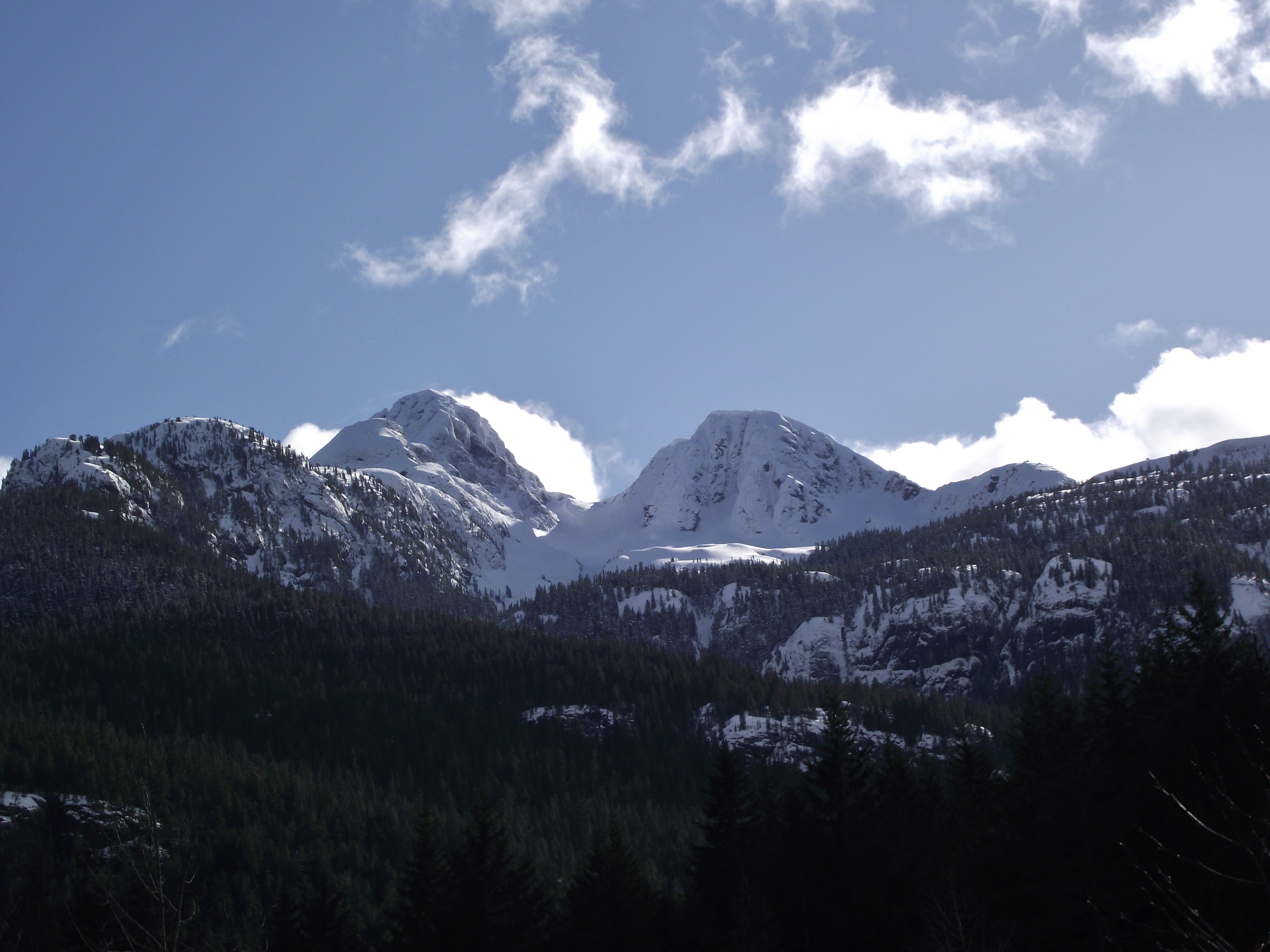
- Kings Peak (left) in Strathcona Provincial Park

Highest point
- Elevation: 2,061 m (6,762 ft)
- Prominence: 328 m (1,076 ft)
- Parent peak: Elkhorn Mountain (2194 m)
- Listing: Mountains of British Columbia
- Coordinates: 49°48′40″N 125°50′12″W

Geography
- Location within Vancouver Island Location within British Columbia
- Location: Vancouver Island, British Columbia, Canada
- District: Nootka Land District
- Parent range: Elk River Mountains
- Topo map: NTS 92F13 Upper Campbell Lake

Climbing
- First ascent: 1913 or 1914

Kings Peak is a mountain located on Vancouver Island in British Columbia, Canada. The mountain is located in Strathcona Provincial Park 25 km (16 mi) northeast of Gold River and 2 km (1 mi) north of Elkhorn Mountain.

It is named after James and Michael King, late 19th century explorers who led an expedition into the region circa 1910.

Kings Peak is close to Highway 28 along the Elk River. It is one of the most frequented mountains on Vancouver Island.
