= Marble Peak (British Columbia) =

Mountain in British Columbia, Canada

- Location within Vancouver Island Location within British Columbia
- Interactive map of Marble Peak

Highest point
- Elevation: 1,761 m (5,778 ft)
- Prominence: 246 m (807 ft)
- Coordinates: 49°41′39.1″N 125°36′28.1″W

Geography
- Location: Vancouver Island, British Columbia, Canada
- District: Nootka Land District
- Parent range: Vancouver Island Ranges
- Topo map: NTS 92F12 Buttle Lake

Marble Peak is a mountain in Strathcona Provincial Park on Vancouver Island, British Columbia, Canada. It is located 33 km (21 mi) east of Gold River and 4 km (2 mi) southeast of Mount McBride.

== See also ==
- List of mountains in Canada
