= Karmutzen Mountain =

Mountain in British Columbia, Canada

- Location within Vancouver Island Location within British Columbia
- Interactive map of Karmutzen Mountain

Highest point
- Elevation: 1,433 m (4,701 ft)
- Prominence: 728 m (2,388 ft)
- Coordinates: 50°21.36666′N 127°0.714′W

Geography
- Location: Vancouver Island, British Columbia, Canada
- District: Rupert Land District
- Parent range: Karmutzen Range
- Topo map: NTS 92L6 Alice Lake

Karmutzen Mountain is a mountain located in the Karmutzen Range on Vancouver Island in British Columbia. It is to the west of Nimpkish Lake which was formerly known as Karmutzen Lake.

== History ==
The mountain name was adapted from the Kwakwaka'wakw word for "waterfall."

== Sources ==
- Philip Stone (2003). Island Alpine, A Guide to the Mountains of Strathcona Park and Vancouver Island. Wild Isle Publications: Heriot Bay, BC. ISBN 0-9680766-5-3.
