= Rugged Mountain =

Mountain on Vancouver Island, British Columbia

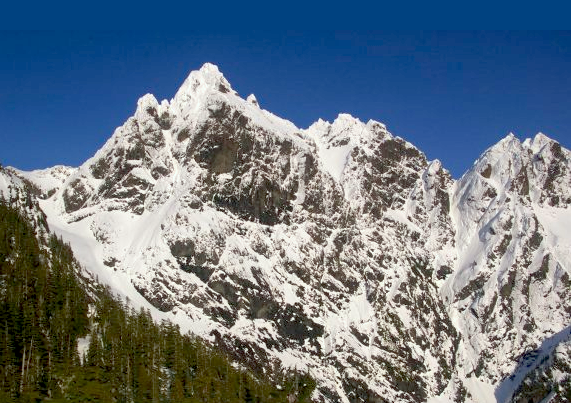
- NW aspect in February

Highest point
- Elevation: 1,861 m (6,106 ft)
- Prominence: 1,571 m (5,154 ft)
- Parent peak: Victoria Peak (2169 m)
- Listing: Mountains of British Columbia; Canada prominent peaks 115th
- Coordinates: 50°01′30″N 126°40′40″W

Geography
- Location within Vancouver Island Location within British Columbia
- Interactive map of Rugged Mountain
- Location: Vancouver Island, British Columbia, Canada
- District: Rupert Land District
- Parent range: Haihte Range; Vancouver Island Ranges
- Topo map: NTS 92L2 Woss Lake

Climbing
- First ascent: 1959 George Lepore

Rugged Mountain is the apex of the Haihte Range on Vancouver Island, British Columbia. From it, several glaciers, Nootka Sound, Woss Lake and the Tlupana Range are in view.

== History ==
The first attempt at an ascent of Rugged Mountain occurs when Captain Hamilton Moffat, officer in charge of the Hudson's Bay Company post at Fort Rupert, near present-day Port Hardy, began a first exploration inland. On July 5, 1852 he gave up his attempt. He named the mountain Ben Lomand. This was the first recorded attempt to climb any of the major peaks of the Vancouver Island Ranges.

The first successful ascent of Rugged Mountain was completed in 1959 by George Lepore and Chuck Smitson.
