= Somerset Range =

Mountain range in British Columbia, Canada

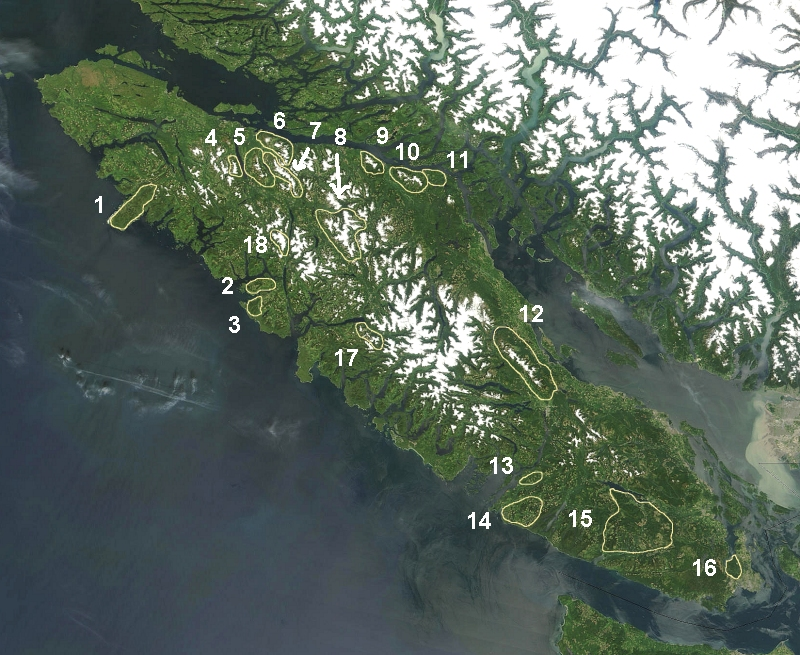
- The Somerset Range is marked 14 on map

Dimensions
- Area: 203 km^{2} (78 mi^{2})

Geography
- Location within British Columbia
- Country: Canada
- Region: British Columbia
- Range coordinates: 48°47′41″N 124°59′34″W
- Parent range: Vancouver Island Ranges

The Somerset Range is a low mountain range comprising the mountains/hills between Nitinat Lake and Barkley Sound's Imperial Eagle Channel on northern Vancouver Island, British Columbia, Canada. It has an area of 203 km^{2} and is a subrange of the Vancouver Island Ranges which in turn form part of the Insular Mountains.

== See also ==
- List of mountain ranges
