= Mount Heber =

Mountain in Canada

- Location within Vancouver Island Location within British Columbia
- Interactive map of Mount Heber

Highest point
- Elevation: 1,683 m (5,522 ft)
- Prominence: 533 m (1,749 ft)
- Coordinates: 49°53′48.8″N 125°55′00.8″W

Geography
- Location: Vancouver Island, British Columbia, Canada
- District: Nootka Land District
- Parent range: Vancouver Island Ranges
- Topo map: NTS 92F13 Upper Campbell Lake

Mount Heber is a mountain on Vancouver Island, British Columbia, Canada, located 16 km (10 mi) northeast of Gold River and 8 km (5 mi) west of Big Den Mountain.

== See also ==
- List of mountains of Canada
