= Pierce Range =

Mountain range in British Columbia, Canada

Coordinates: 49.58°N 126.05°W

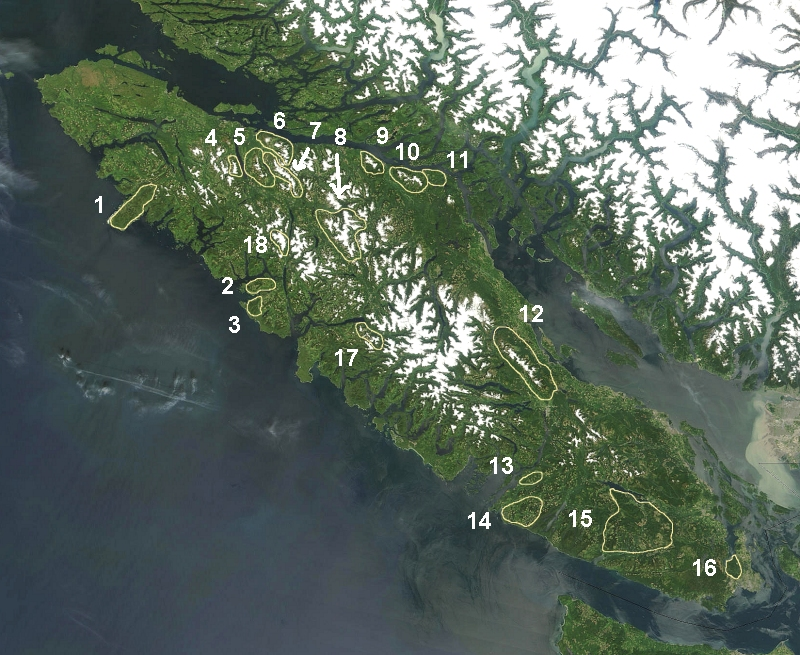
- The Pierce Range is marked 17 on map

Dimensions
- Area: 94 km^{2} (36 mi^{2})

Geography
- Location within British Columbia
- Country: Canada
- Region: British Columbia
- Parent range: Vancouver Island Ranges

The Pierce Range is a small very steep-sided mountain range on central Vancouver Island, British Columbia, Canada. It has an area of 94 km^{2} and is a subrange of the Vancouver Island Ranges which in turn form part of the Insular Mountains.

== See also ==
- List of mountain ranges
