= Crest Mountain =

Mountain in British Columbia, Canada

- Location within Vancouver Island Location within British Columbia
- Interactive map of Crest Mountain

Highest point
- Elevation: 1,566 m (5,138 ft)
- Prominence: 336 m (1,102 ft)
- Coordinates: 49°52′18.8″N 125°52′34.0″W

Geography
- Location: Vancouver Island, British Columbia, Canada
- District: Nootka Land District
- Parent range: Vancouver Island Ranges
- Topo map: NTS 92F13 Upper Campbell Lake

Crest Mountain is a mountain on Vancouver Island, British Columbia, Canada, located 16 km (10 mi) northeast of Gold River and 5 km (3 mi) west of Big Den Mountain.

== See also ==
- List of mountains of Canada
