= Lone Wolf Mountain =

Mountain in Canada

- Location within Vancouver Island Location within British Columbia
- Interactive map of Lone Wolf Mountain

Highest point
- Elevation: 1,479 m (4,852 ft)
- Prominence: 734 m (2,408 ft)
- Coordinates: 49°27′58.0″N 125°54′46.1″W

Geography
- Location: Vancouver Island, British Columbia, Canada
- District: Clayoquot Land District
- Parent range: Vancouver Island Ranges
- Topo map: NTS 92F5 Bedwell River

Lone Wolf Mountain is a mountain on Vancouver Island, British Columbia, Canada, located 35 km (22 mi) north of Tofino and 11 km (7 mi) south of Splendor Mountain.

== See also ==
- List of mountains of Canada
