= Prince of Wales Range (Canada) =

Mountain range in British Columbia, Canada

Coordinates: 50°19′23″N 125°47′04″W

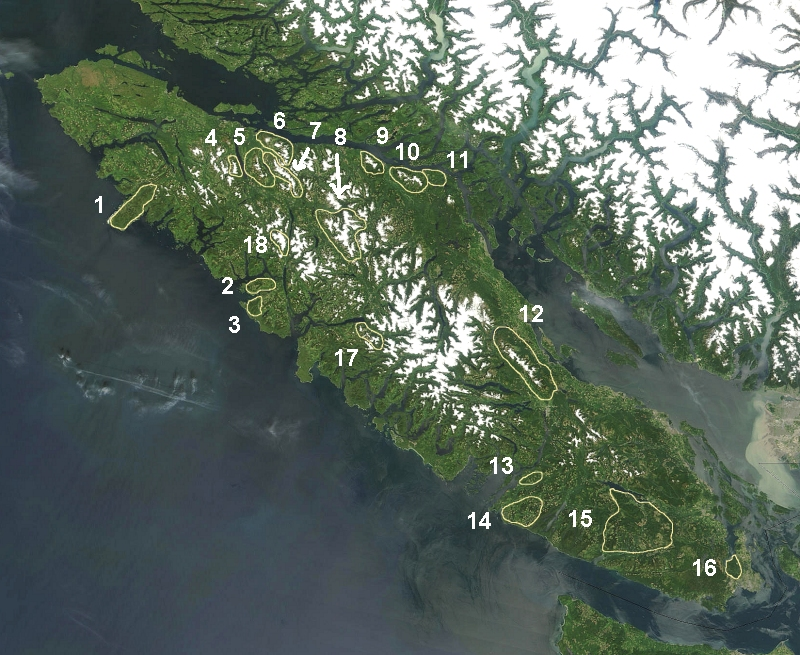
- The Prince of Wales Range is marked 10 on map

Dimensions
- Area: 188 km^{2} (73 mi^{2})

Geography
- Location within British Columbia
- Country: Canada
- Region: British Columbia
- Parent range: Vancouver Island Ranges

The Prince of Wales Range is a small mountain range on the east central coast of Vancouver Island, British Columbia, Canada, located about 40 km (25 mi) north of Campbell River. It has an area of 188 km^{2} and is a subrange of the Vancouver Island Ranges which in turn form part of the Insular Mountains.

== See also ==
- List of mountain ranges
