= El Piveto Mountain =

Mountain in British Columbia, Canada

- Location within Vancouver Island Location within British Columbia
- Interactive map of El Piveto Mountain

Highest point
- Elevation: 1,960 m (6,430 ft)
- Prominence: 500 m (1,600 ft)
- Parent peak: Rambler Peak (2092 m)
- Listing: Mountains of British Columbia
- Coordinates: 49°43′17″N 125°47′12″W

Geography
- Location: Vancouver Island, British Columbia, Canada
- District: Nootka Land District
- Parent range: Vancouver Island Ranges
- Topo map: NTS 92F12 Buttle Lake

Climbing
- First ascent: 1966

El Piveto Mountain is a mountain located between Wolf River and Cervus Creek on Vancouver Island, British Columbia, Canada, 2 km (1 mi) southeast of Rambler Peak and 24 km (15 mi) east of Gold River.

== History ==
The first ascent of El Piveto Mountain was completed in 1966 by Mike Walsh, Pat and Elizabeth Guilbride, Bob Tustin, Ray Paine, Syd Watts and John and Doreen Cowlin.
