= Alexandra Peak =

Mountain in the country of Canada

- Location within British Columbia
- Interactive map of Alexandra Peak

Highest point
- Elevation: 1,983 m (6,506 ft)
- Prominence: 1,061 m (3,481 ft)
- Parent peak: Mount Albert Edward
- Coordinates: 49°44′17″N 125°29′33″W

Geography
- Location: Vancouver Island, British Columbia, Canada
- District: Comox Land District
- Parent range: Vancouver Island Ranges
- Topo map: NTS 92F11 Forbidden Plateau

Alexandra Peak is a mountain on Vancouver Island, British Columbia, Canada, located 36 km (22 mi) southwest of Campbell River and 8 km (5 mi) northwest of Mount Albert Edward.

Alexandra Peak is a member of the Vancouver Island Ranges which in turn form part of the Insular Mountains.

== Name origin ==
The mountain was named for Alexandra, Princess of Wales.

== See also ==
- List of mountains in Canada
- Monarchy in British Columbia
- Royal eponyms in Canada
