= Maquilla Peak =

Mountain in British Columbia, Canada

- Location within Vancouver Island Location within British Columbia
- Interactive map of Maquilla Peak

Highest point
- Elevation: 1,815 m (5,955 ft)
- Prominence: 685 m (2,247 ft)
- Coordinates: 50°06′45″N 126°20′23″W

Geography
- Location: Vancouver Island, British Columbia, Canada
- District: Rupert Land District
- Parent range: Sutton Range
- Topo map: NTS 92L1 Schoen Lake

Climbing
- First ascent: 1912 A.J. Campbell survey party

Maquilla Peak is a mountain on Vancouver Island, British Columbia, Canada, located 22 km (14 mi) southeast of Woss and 11 km (7 mi) northwest of Sutton Peak.

== See also ==
- List of mountains of Canada
