= Popsicle Peak =

Mountain in British Columbia, Canada

- Location within Vancouver Island Location within British Columbia
- Interactive map of Popsicle Peak

Highest point
- Elevation: 1,673 m (5,489 ft)
- Prominence: 323 m (1,060 ft)
- Listing: List of mountains in Canada
- Coordinates: 49°37′27.9″N 125°54′51.8″W

Geography
- Location: Vancouver Island, British Columbia, Canada
- District: Nootka Land District
- Parent range: Vancouver Island Ranges
- Topo map: NTS 92F12 Buttle Lake

Popsicle Peak is a mountain on Vancouver Island, British Columbia, Canada, located 20 km (12 mi) southeast of Gold River and 4 km (2 mi) southwest of M.S. Mountain.
