= Haihte Range =

Mountain range in British Columbia, Canada

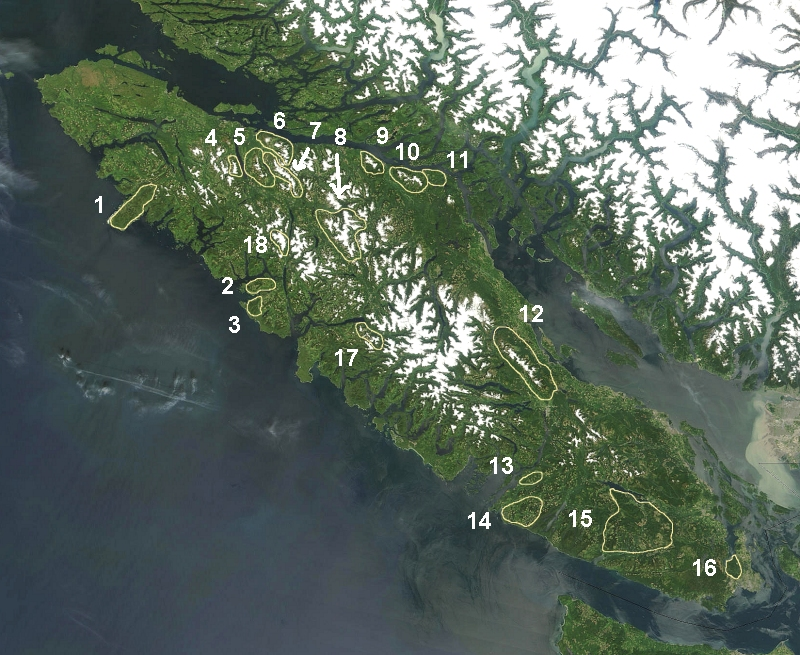
- The Somerset Range is marked 18 on map

Dimensions
- Area: 75 km^{2} (29 mi^{2})

Geography
- Location within British Columbia
- Country: Canada
- Region: British Columbia
- Range coordinates: 50°03′N 126°42′W
- Parent range: Vancouver Island Ranges

The Haihte Range is a small mountain range on central Vancouver Island, British Columbia, Canada. It has an area of 75 km^{2} and is a subrange of the Vancouver Island Ranges which in turn form part of the Insular Mountains.

The Haihte Range contains some of the largest remaining glaciers on Vancouver Island.

== See also ==
- List of mountain ranges
