= Matchlee Mountain =

Mountain in British Columbia, Canada

- Location within Vancouver Island Location within British Columbia
- Interactive map of Matchlee Mountain

Highest point
- Elevation: 1,822 m (5,978 ft)
- Prominence: 777 m (2,549 ft)
- Coordinates: 49°37′54.8″N 125°58′00.9″W

Geography
- Location: Vancouver Island, British Columbia, Canada
- District: Nootka Land District
- Parent range: Vancouver Island Ranges
- Topo map: NTS 92F12 Buttle Lake

Matchlee Mountain is a mountain on Vancouver Island, British Columbia, Canada, located 18 km (11 mi) south of Gold River and 16 km (10 mi) west of Golden Hinde.

== See also ==
- List of mountains in Canada
