= The Behinde =

Mountain

- Location within Vancouver Island Location within British Columbia
- Interactive map of The Behinde

Highest point
- Elevation: 2,018 m (6,621 ft)
- Prominence: 297 m (974 ft)
- Coordinates: 49°39′51.1″N 125°46′14.2″W

Geography
- Location: Vancouver Island, British Columbia, Canada
- District: Nootka Land District
- Parent range: Vancouver Island Ranges
- Topo map: NTS 92F12 Buttle Lake

The Behinde is a mountain on Vancouver Island, British Columbia, Canada, located 24 km (15 mi) southeast of Gold River and 2 km (1 mi) west of Golden Hinde.

The Behinde is a member of the Vancouver Island Ranges which in turn form part of the Insular Mountains.

== See also ==
- List of mountains in Canada
