= Mount Bate =

Mountain on Vancouver Island in Strathcona Regional District, British Columbia, Canada

- Location within Vancouver Island Location within British Columbia
- Interactive map of Mount Bate

Highest point
- Elevation: 1,688 m (5,538 ft)
- Prominence: 1,218 m (3,996 ft)
- Coordinates: 49°53′24.0″N 126°28′24.0″W

Geography
- Location: Strathcona Regional District, British Columbia, Canada
- District: Nootka Land District
- Parent range: Vancouver Island Ranges
- Topo map: NTS 92E16 Gold River

Mount Bate is a mountain on Vancouver Island in Strathcona Regional District, British Columbia, Canada, 14 km (9 mi) east of the community of Tahsis and 21 km (13 mi) southwest of Rugged Mountain. Mount Bate is thought to have been named by George Henry Richards for Captain William Thornton Bate, RN, a surveyor who was killed in the capture of Canton during the Second Opium War in 1857. The mountain is at the head of Canton Gorge, another geographical feature named by Richards.
