= Volcano Peak =

Mountain with volcanic rock in the state of Nevada

Coordinates: 38°30′05″N 118°05′18″W

Volcano Peak is a summit in the U.S. state of Nevada. The elevation is 6,568 feet (2,002 m).

Volcano Peak was so named on account of volcanic rock near the summit.
