= Mount Cobb (British Columbia) =

Mountain in British Columbia, Canada

- Location within Vancouver Island Location within British Columbia
- Interactive map of Mount Cobb

Highest point
- Elevation: 2,030 m (6,660 ft)
- Prominence: 385 m (1,263 ft)
- Coordinates: 49°47′23″N 125°49′40″W

Geography
- Location: Vancouver Island, British Columbia, Canada
- District: Nootka Land District
- Parent range: Vancouver Island Ranges
- Topo map: NTS 92F13 Upper Campbell Lake

Mount Cobb is a mountain on Vancouver Island, British Columbia, Canada, located 22 km (14 mi) east of Gold River and 2 km (1 mi) southwest of Mount Filberg.

Mount Cobb is a member of the Vancouver Island Ranges which in turn form part of the Insular Mountains.

== See also ==
- List of mountains of Canada
