= Elkhorn Mountain =

Mountain in Canada

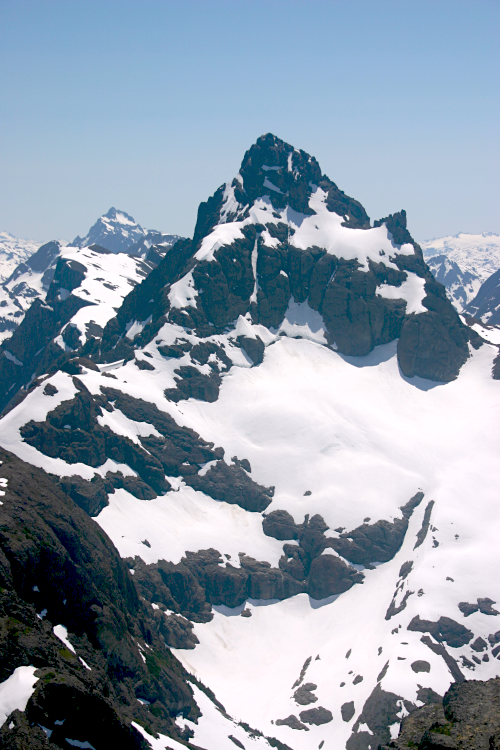
- Elkhorn Mountain, north aspect (June 2008)

Highest point
- Elevation: 2,194 m (7,198 ft)
- Prominence: 1,024 m (3,360 ft)
- Listing: Mountains of British Columbia
- Coordinates: 49°47′23″N 125°49′40″W

Geography
- Location within Vancouver Island Location within British Columbia
- Interactive map of Elkhorn Mountain
- Location: Vancouver Island, British Columbia, Canada
- District: Nootka Land District
- Parent range: Elk River Mountains
- Topo map: NTS 92F13 Upper Campbell Lake

Climbing
- First ascent: 1912 ACC party led by A.O. Wheeler

Elkhorn Mountain is a mountain located in the Elk River Mountains of the Vancouver Island Ranges of British Columbia, Canada. At 2,194 m (7,198 ft), it is the second highest peak on Vancouver Island, second only to the nearby Golden Hinde which lies 15 km (9 mi) to the south. The mountain is located in the 2,500 km² Strathcona Provincial Park, 24 km (15 mi) east of Gold River.

== Location ==
Elkhorn is one of the most accessible of the tall mountains on the Island as it is only a one-hour drive from Campbell River to the head of the Elk River Trail (ERT). It is only a half-hour walk along the ERT to a small campsite where one crosses the Elk River and starts a steep ascent up into the alpine. Above the treeline, one has a view of the objective, a steep and dominant hornlike peak that presents parties with a variety of routes. The most popular ascent route is the North West Ridge, although not the easiest (the West Face is) it has the aesthetics of a classic which is only fitting as it is the original, first ascent route. Elkhorn can also be accessed further up the ERT from the upper gravel flats which is home to the main campsite along the ERT. The route that leaves at the upper gravel flats is not in near as good shape, although if late in the year a dry stream bed can be followed for a large portion of the approach.

== History ==
The peak was first ascended (and given its current name) in 1912 by A.O Wheeler, Edward Wheeler, Albert MacCarthy, D.A. Gillies, A.R. Hart, J.R. Robertson, H.O. Frind, L.C. Wilson and F.A. Robertson of the Alpine Club of Canada. For many years there was speculation about whether or not Elkhorn, earlier known as Strathcona's Matterhorn, might be the highest mountain on the island. The question has since been resolved.

Noticeable ascents include the first winter ascent on March 24, 1968, by Peter Busch and Alastair Watt via the Northwest Ridge, the first ascent of the North Ridge by Joe Bajan, Stewart Wozny, Dave Smith and Tom Muirhead in 1972, the North Face on June 18, 1977, by Joe Bajan and Peter Busch and a sub 4 hour speed ascent by Lindsay Elms on August 21, 1992.

== See also ==
- List of mountains in Strathcona Provincial Park
- List of mountains of Canada

== Sources ==
- Philip Stone (2003). Island Alpine, A Guide to the Mountains of Strathcona Park and Vancouver Island. Wild Isle Publications: Heriot Bay, BC. ISBN 0-9680766-5-3.
- Lindsay Elms (1996). Beyond Nootka, A Historical Perspective of Vancouver Island Mountains. Misthorn Press: Courtenay, BC. ISBN 0-9680159-0-5.
