= Mount Burman =

Mountain in British Columbia, Canada

- Location within Vancouver Island Location within British Columbia
- Interactive map of Mount Burman

Highest point
- Elevation: 1,754 m (5,755 ft)
- Prominence: 449 m (1,473 ft)
- Coordinates: 49°37′26.0″N 125°43′52.0″W

Geography
- Location: Vancouver Island, British Columbia, Canada
- District: Nootka Land District
- Parent range: Vancouver Island Ranges
- Topo map: NTS 92F12 Buttle Lake

Mount Burman is a rounded mountain on Vancouver Island, British Columbia, Canada, located 29 km (18 mi) southeast of Gold River, south of Golden Hinde and west of Schjelderup Lake.

== See also ==
- List of mountains in Canada
