= Mount Judson =

Mountain in British Columbia

- Location within Vancouver Island Location within British Columbia
- Interactive map of Mount Judson

Highest point
- Elevation: 1,741 m (5,712 ft)
- Prominence: 759 m (2,490 ft)
- Coordinates: 49°56′24.0″N 125°55′18.8″W

Geography
- Location: Vancouver Island, British Columbia, Canada
- District: Nootka Land District
- Parent range: Vancouver Island Ranges
- Topo map: NTS 92F13 Upper Campbell Lake

Mount Judson is a mountain on Vancouver Island, British Columbia, Canada, located 20 km (12 mi) northeast of Gold River and 8 km (5 mi) west of Crown Mountain.

== See also ==
- List of mountains in Canada
