= Mount Myra =

Mountain in British Columbia, Canada

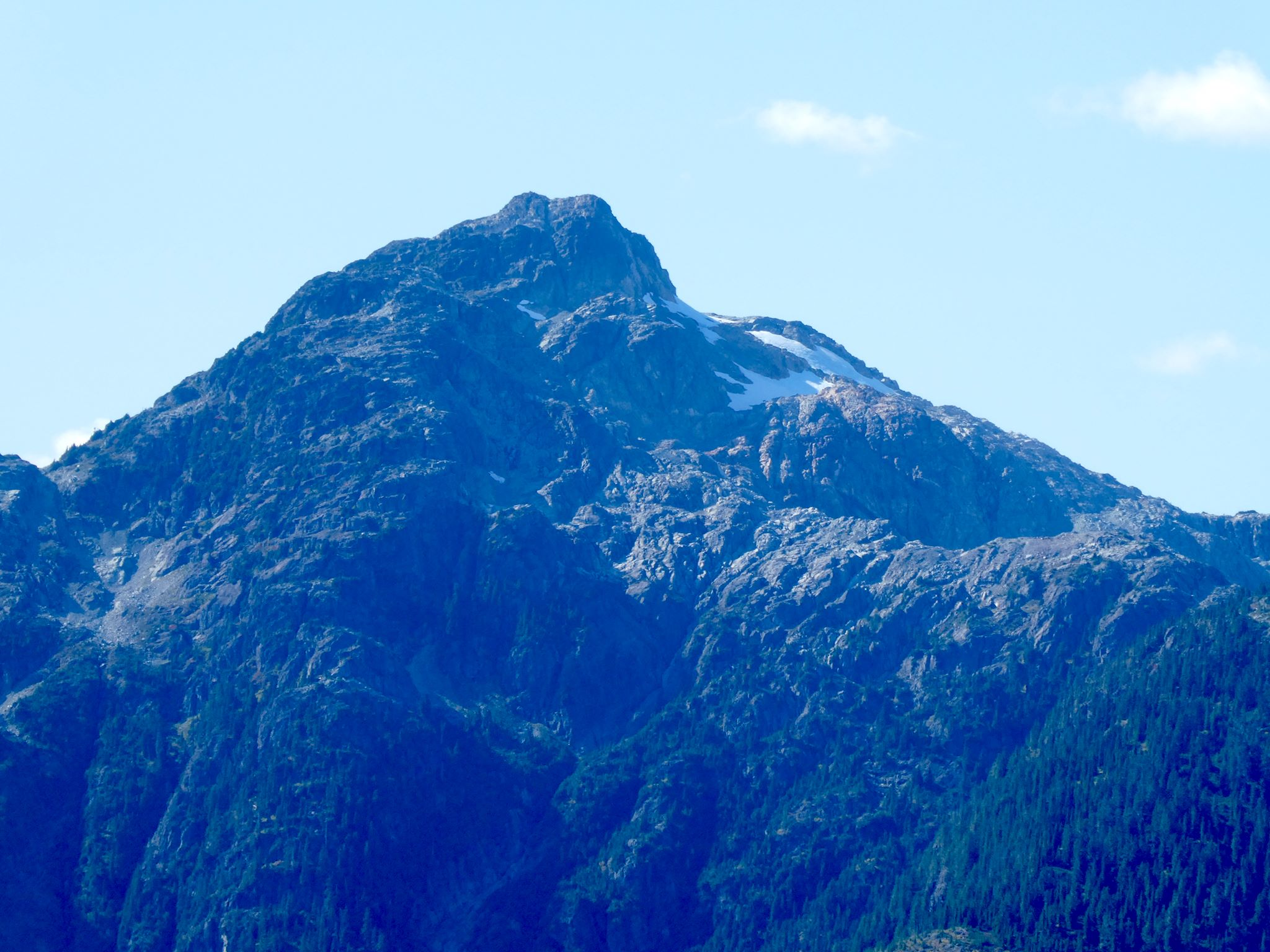
- East aspect, from Flower Ridge

Highest point
- Elevation: 1,803 m (5,915 ft)
- Prominence: 781 m (2,562 ft)
- Coordinates: 49°32′39.8″N 125°36′22.0″W

Geography
- Location within Vancouver Island Location within British Columbia
- Interactive map of Mount Myra
- Location: Vancouver Island, British Columbia, Canada
- District: Clayoquot Land District
- Parent range: Vancouver Island Ranges
- Topo map: NTS 92F12 Buttle Lake

Mount Myra is a mountain on Vancouver Island, British Columbia, Canada, located 41 km (25 mi) southeast of Gold River and 20 km (12 mi) south of Mount McBride.

== See also ==
- List of mountains of Canada
