= Mount Colonel Foster =

Mountain in British Columbia, Canada

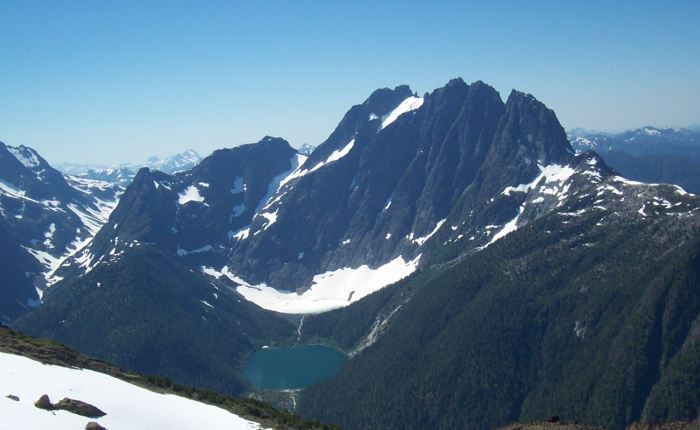

Highest point
- Elevation: 2,135 m (7,005 ft)
- Prominence: 864 m (2,835 ft)
- Parent peak: Elkhorn Mountain (2194 m)
- Listing: Mountains of British Columbia
- Coordinates: 49°44′58″N 125°52′02″W

Geography
- Location within Vancouver Island Location within British Columbia
- Interactive map of Mount Colonel Foster
- Location: Strathcona Regional District, British Columbia, Canada
- District: Nootka Land District
- Parent range: Elk River Mountains
- Topo map: NTS 92F12 Buttle Lake

Climbing
- First ascent: 1968, Mike Walsh

Mount Colonel Foster is a mountain located on Vancouver Island in Strathcona Regional District, British Columbia, Canada. At 2,135 metres (7,005 ft), it is the fourth highest peak on the island. It is one of the nine Island Qualifiers.

Mount Colonel Foster is located across the Elk River from Elkhorn Mountain. The east face is a 1,000-metre (3,281 ft) wall.

== History ==
Mount Colonel Foster is named in honour of Colonel (later Major General) William Foster who was war veteran, a provincial government official, an avid mountaineer and an anti-union business leader. It was during the 1912 Alpine Club of Canada ascent of Elkhorn Mountain, which was led by Edward Wheeler, that a jagged peak at the head of the Elk River Valley was noticed and named after Foster.

On June 23, 1946, a magnitude 7.2 earthquake centred to the east of Strathcona Park, caused a slide which resulted in 1.5 million cubic metres (53 million cubic feet) of rock, about half of which found its way to Landslide Lake below. The slide and a huge displacement wave caused devastation in the upper Elk Valley. The damage is clearly visible to this day.

The mountain is regarded as technically difficult and was not climbed until July 1968 by Mike Walsh during a solo attempt. The East Face above Landslide lake has a drop of up to 1,300 metres (4,300 ft), longer than that of El Capitan in Yosemite, making it one of the tallest continuous mountain faces in the world. While there are numerous rock and winter routes, the mountain is still relatively unknown outside a circle of dedicated climbers. Notable climbs include the first ascent of the East Face by Dick Culbert, Paul Starr and Fred Douglas over the Labour Day weekend 1972, the first solo ascent of the East Face by Joe Bajan in August 1974 when he climbed the Grand Central Couloir and the first winter ascent of the East Face was by Joe Bajan and Ross Nichol in January 1979 when they climbed the Directtisma Route. In January 1985 Doug Scott, Greg Child and Rob Wood made the second winter ascent of the East Face via Bajan's Grand Central Couloir.

== Access ==
Access is via the Elk River Hiking Trail 12 kilometres (7.5 mi) to Landslide Lake.

== See also ==
- List of mountains in Strathcona Provincial Park

== Sources ==
- Philip Stone (2003). Island Alpine, A Guide to the Mountains of Strathcona Park and Vancouver Island. Wild Isle Publications: Heriot Bay, BC. ISBN 0-9680766-5-3.
- Lindsay Elms (1996). Beyond Nootka, A Historical Perspective of Vancouver Island Mountains. Misthorn Press: Courtenay, BC. ISBN 0-9680159-0-5.
