= Mount Kent-Urquhart =

Mountain

- Location within Vancouver Island Location within British Columbia
- Interactive map of Mount Kent-Urquhart

Highest point
- Elevation: 1,802 m (5,912 ft)
- Prominence: 677 m (2,221 ft)
- Coordinates: 49°40′35.0″N 125°53′48.8″W

Geography
- Location: Vancouver Island, British Columbia, Canada
- District: Nootka Land District
- Parent range: Vancouver Island Ranges
- Topo map: NTS 92F12 Buttle Lake

Mount Kent-Urquhart is a mountain on Vancouver Island, British Columbia, Canada, located 16 km (10 mi) southeast of Gold River and 11 km (7 mi) west of Golden Hinde.

== See also ==
- List of mountains of Canada
