= Bonanza Range =

Mountain range on Vancouver Island in British Columbia, Canada

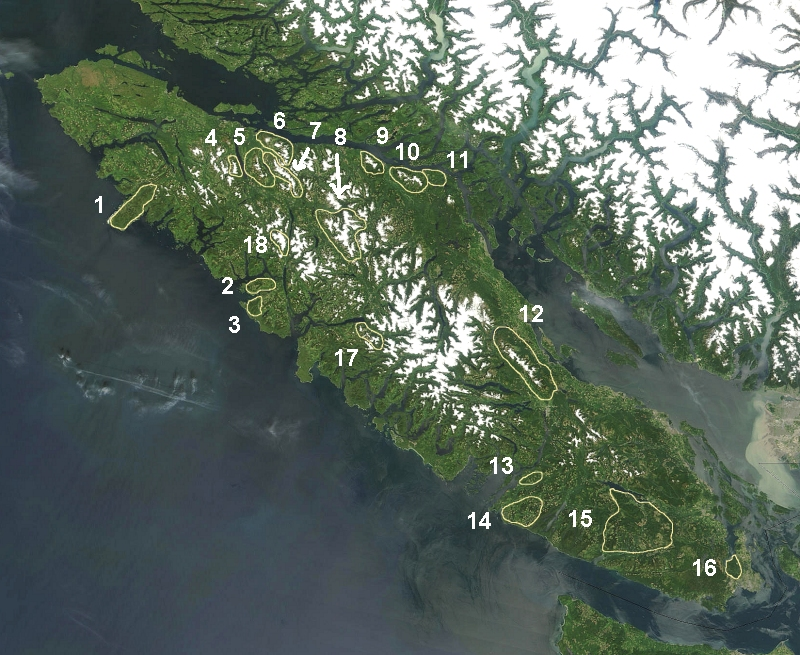
- The Bonanza Range is marked 7 on map

Geography
- Location within British Columbia
- Country: Canada
- Region: British Columbia
- Range coordinates: 50°21′N 126°40′W
- Parent range: Vancouver Island Ranges

The Bonanza Range is a small mountain range on Vancouver Island, British Columbia, Canada, located in the area between the Nimpkish River and the Tsitika River. It has an area of 150 km^{2} and is a subrange of the Vancouver Island Ranges which in turn form part of the Insular Mountains.

== See also ==
- List of mountain ranges
