= Big Den Mountain =

Mountain in British Columbia, Canada

- Location within Vancouver Island Location within British Columbia
- Location in Strathcona Provincial Park

Highest point
- Elevation: 1,774 m (5,820 ft)
- Prominence: 624 m (2,047 ft)
- Coordinates: 49°53′07.1″N 125°48′46.1″W

Geography
- Location: Vancouver Island, British Columbia, Canada
- District: Nootka Land District
- Parent range: Vancouver Island Ranges
- Topo map: NTS 92F13 Upper Campbell Lake

Big Den Mountain is a mountain on Vancouver Island, British Columbia, Canada, located 20 km (12 mi) northeast of Gold River and 7 km (4 mi) south of Crown Mountain.

== See also ==
- List of mountains of Canada
