= Rambler Peak =

Mountain in British Columbia, Canada

- Location within Vancouver Island Location within British Columbia
- Interactive map of Rambler Peak

Highest point
- Elevation: 2,092 m (6,864 ft)
- Prominence: 647 m (2,123 ft)
- Listing: Mountains of British Columbia
- Coordinates: 49°44′01″N 125°49′49″W

Geography
- Location: Vancouver Island, British Columbia, Canada
- District: Nootka Land District
- Parent range: Elk River Mountains
- Topo map: NTS 92F12 Buttle Lake

Climbing
- First ascent: 1964 R. Facer, B. McDowell, S. Todd

Rambler Peak is a mountain located on Vancouver Island, British Columbia. The mountain is 23 km (14 mi) east of Gold River and 4 km (2 mi) southeast of Mount Colonel Foster

This mountain is a hydrographic divide located at the headwaters of the Elk River. The Wolf, Elk, Ucoma Rivers and Cervus Creek all start at Rambler Peak.

== History ==
The difficulty in scaling this peak defeated attempts for many years. The first successful attempt was July 19, 1964 when Cameron Powell, Barrie McDowell and Steve Todd of the Island Ramblers Mountaineering Club reached the top. The mountain was named in honour of their club. Rambler peak was originally called El Piveto Mountain a name by which another BC mountain is now known.
