= Mount Filberg =

Mountain in Canada

- Location within Vancouver Island Location within British Columbia

Highest point
- Elevation: 2,035 m (6,677 ft)
- Prominence: 584 m (1,916 ft)
- Coordinates: 49°48′28.1″N 125°43′39.0″W

Geography
- Location: Vancouver Island, British Columbia, Canada
- District: Nootka Land District
- Parent range: Vancouver Island Ranges
- Topo map: NTS 92F13 Upper Campbell Lake

Mount Filberg is a mountain on Vancouver Island, British Columbia, Canada, located 23 km (14 mi) east of Gold River and 10 km (6 mi) northeast of Rambler Peak. It is a member of the Vancouver Island Ranges which in turn form part of the Insular Mountains.

== See also ==
- List of mountains in Canada
