= Mount McBride =

Mountain in British Columbia, Canada

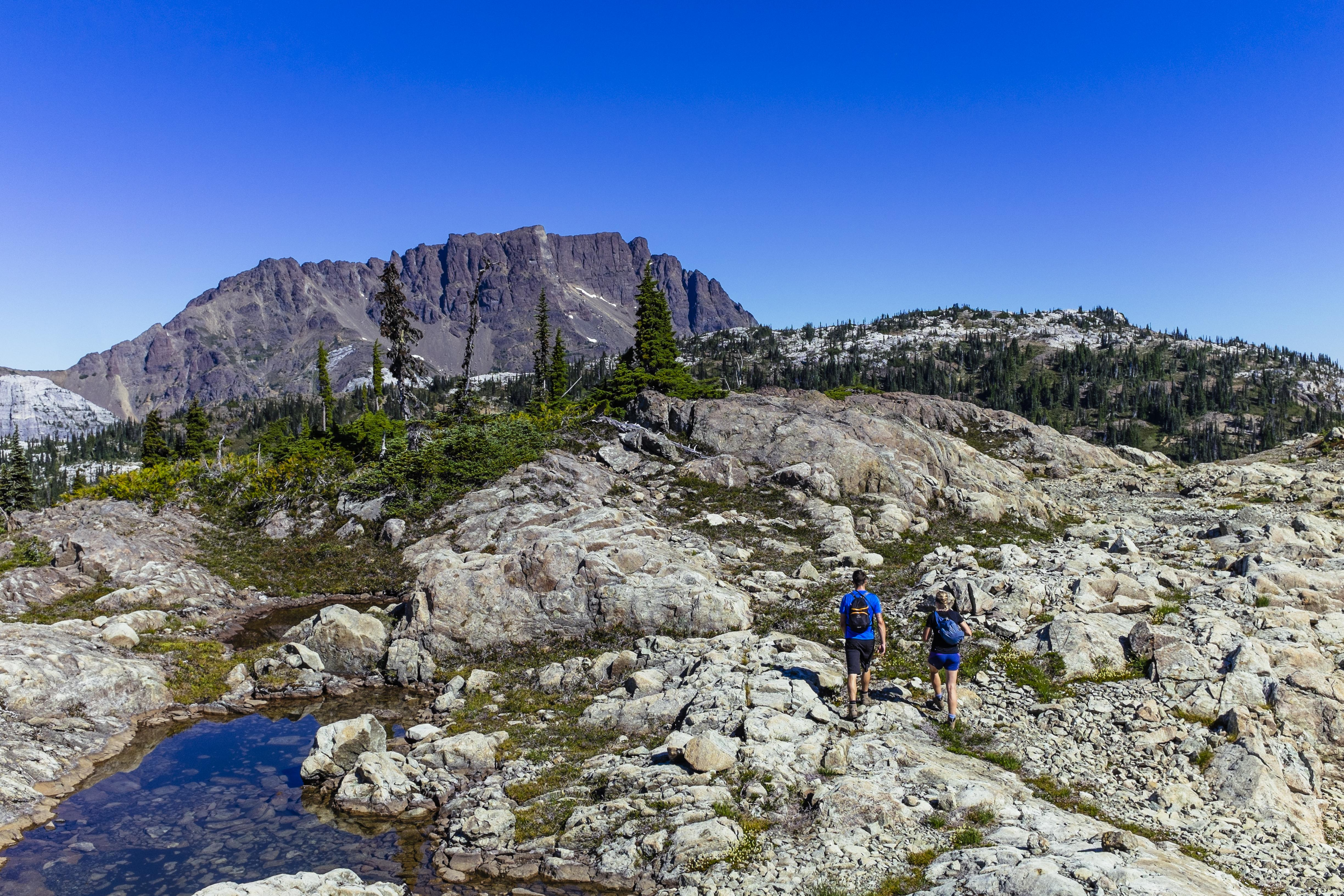
- Mount McBride from Globe Flower Lake in Strathcona Provincial Park

Highest point
- Elevation: 2,083 m (6,834 ft)
- Prominence: 918 m (3,012 ft)
- Listing: Mountains of British Columbia
- Coordinates: 49°43.3′N 125°39.0′W

Geography
- Location within Vancouver Island Location within British Columbia
- Location: Vancouver Island, British Columbia, Canada
- District: Nootka Land District
- Parent range: Vancouver Island Ranges
- Topo map: NTS 92F12 Buttle Lake

Climbing
- First ascent: 1926

Mount McBride is a mountain located on Vancouver Island in British Columbia, Canada. It is 34 km (21 mi) east of Gold River and 10 km (6.2 mi) northeast of Golden Hinde.

Mount McBride is one of two peaks in British Columbia named for BC Premier Sir Richard McBride. The other is Mount Sir Richard. There is a second Mount McBride—named for Captain Kenneth Gilbert McBride of The Seaforth Highlanders of Canada, a Canadian officer killed in action during the Second World War—elsewhere in BC and yet another in the Yukon.

The first ascent is uncertain but may have been Leroy Stirling Cokely in 1926.
