= Sutton Peak =

Mountain in Canada

- Location within Vancouver Island Location within British Columbia
- Interactive map of Sutton Peak

Highest point
- Elevation: 1,874 m (6,148 ft)
- Prominence: 1,364 m (4,475 ft)
- Coordinates: 50°02′28.0″N 126°14′07.0″W

Geography
- Location: Vancouver Island, British Columbia, Canada
- District: Rupert Land District
- Parent range: Sutton Range
- Topo map: NTS 92L1 Schoen Lake

Sutton Peak is a mountain on Vancouver Island, British Columbia, Canada, located 32 km (20 mi) northwest of Gold River and 10 km (6 mi) west of Victoria Peak.

== See also ==
- List of mountains in Canada
