= Crown Mountain (Vancouver Island) =

Mountain in Strathcona Regional District, British Columbia, Canada

- Location within Vancouver Island Location within British Columbia
- Interactive map of Crown Mountain

Highest point
- Elevation: 1,846 m (6,056 ft)
- Prominence: 1,339 m (4,393 ft)
- Parent peak: Victoria Peak (2169 m)
- Listing: Mountains of British Columbia
- Coordinates: 49°56′40″N 125°48′48″W

Geography
- Location: Vancouver Island, British Columbia, Canada
- District: Nootka Land District
- Parent range: Elk River Mountains
- Topo map: NTS 92F13 Upper Campbell Lake

Climbing
- First ascent: 1910 by P. Ellison and survey party

Crown Mountain, sometimes called Ellison Peak, is a mountain located in Strathcona Provincial Park on Vancouver Island in British Columbia.

== History ==
The mountain has historic significance in British Columbia. It formed one corner of the large land grant given to Robert Dunsmuir to fund construction of the E&N Railway. A segment of the boundary of that grant later became a boundary of Strathcona Provincial Park. When BC Premier Sir Richard McBride set aside a reserve for the park, his Minister of Lands, Price Ellison, lead an expedition to explore the new park reserve which included the first ascent of Crown Mountain on July 29, 1910. The crew included Ellison's 20-year-old daughter, Myra King Ellison, who was first to set foot on the peak, as well as Colonel William Holmes, J. Twaddle, A.L. Hudson, Harry McClure Johnson (a cousin of Myra's), Charles Haslam, James Hasworth and Frank Ward.
