= Victoria Peak (British Columbia) =

Mountain in British Columbia, Canada

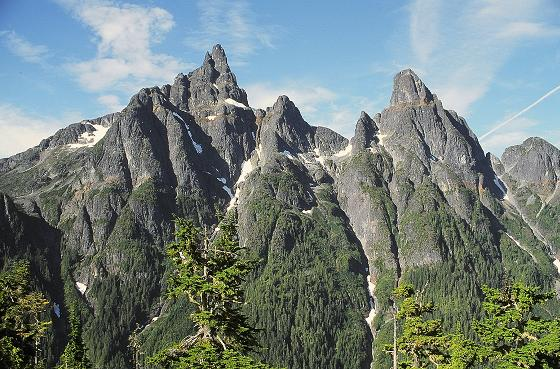
- Victoria Peak on the left and Warden Peak on the right

Highest point
- Elevation: 2,163 m (7,096 ft)
- Prominence: 1,849 m (6,066 ft)
- Parent peak: Golden Hinde (2197 m)
- Listing: Mountains of British Columbia; Canada prominent peaks 53rd
- Coordinates: 50°03′16″N 126°06′04″W

Geography
- Location within Vancouver Island Location within British Columbia
- Location: Vancouver Island, British Columbia, Canada
- District: Rupert Land District
- Parent range: Sutton Range
- Topo map: NTS 92L1 Schoen Lake

Climbing
- First ascent: 1950s Otto Winning, Syd Watts

Victoria Peak is a mountain located in the Sutton Range of the Vancouver Island Ranges. At 2163 m, it is the third highest peak on Vancouver Island. The mountain is located on the White River valley and has mountains of comparable elevation nearby. It is accessible as a day trip by logging road and is visible from Campbell River and the Discovery Islands.

== See also ==
- Mountain peaks of Canada
- List of Ultras of North America
- Monarchy in British Columbia
- Royal eponyms in Canada
