= Clayoquot Land District =

Land district in British Columbia, Canada

Clayoquot Land District is one of the 59 land districts of British Columbia, Canada, which are part of the cadastral divisions of British Columbia, created with rest of those on Vancouver Island via the Lands Act of the Colony of Vancouver Island. The British Columbia government's BC Names system, a subdivision of GeoBC, defines a land district as "a territorial division with legally defined boundaries for administrative purposes". All land titles and surveys use the Land District system as the primary point of reference, and entries in BC Names for placenames and geographical objects are so listed.

Clayoquot Land District is located between Barclay and Nootka Land Districts on the west of Vancouver Island.
