= Elk River Mountains =

Mountain range in British Columbia, Canada

Dimensions
- Area: 113 km^{2} (44 mi^{2})

Geography
- Country: Canada
- Province: British Columbia
- Parent range: Vancouver Island Ranges

The Elk River Mountains is a rugged group of mountains in the heart of Strathcona Provincial Park on Vancouver Island, British Columbia, Canada. It has an area of 113 km^{2} and is part of the Vancouver Island Ranges which in turn form part of the Insular Mountains.

== See also ==
- List of mountain ranges
