= Mount Abel (British Columbia) =

Mountain in British Columbia, Canada

- Location within Vancouver Island Location within British Columbia
- Interactive map of Mount Abel

Highest point
- Elevation: 1,822 m (5,978 ft)
- Prominence: 1,307 m (4,288 ft)
- Coordinates: 50°12′42.8″N 126°19′13.1″W

Geography
- Location: Vancouver Island, British Columbia, Canada
- District: Rupert Land District
- Parent range: Vancouver Island Ranges
- Topo map: NTS 92L1 Schoen Lake

Mount Abel is a mountain on Vancouver Island, British Columbia, Canada, located 20 km (12 mi) east of Woss and 20 km (12 mi) north of Sutton Peak.

== See also ==
- List of mountains in Canada
