= Nimpkish Lake =

Lake on Vancouver Island in British Columbia, Canada

- Location within British Columbia
- Location: Vancouver Island, British Columbia, Canada
- Coordinates: 50°24′01″N 126°58′33″W
- Type: lake
- Surface area: 37 km^{2} (14 sq mi)
- Average depth: 161 m (528 ft)
- Max. depth: 320 m (1,050 ft)
- Water volume: 5.96 km^{3} (1.43 cu mi)
- Surface elevation: 20 m (66 ft)

Nimpkish Lake is a lake in the Northern Vancouver Island region of British Columbia, Canada. It is the location of Nimpkish Lake Provincial Park and is 32 km south of Port McNeill. The lake is in the traditional territory of the Namgis First Nation, who are its namesake. It is part of the drainage basin of the Nimpkish River.

== See also ==
- List of lakes of British Columbia
