= Sutton Range =

Mountain range in British Columbia, Canada

Coordinates: 50°05′00″N 126°15′00″W

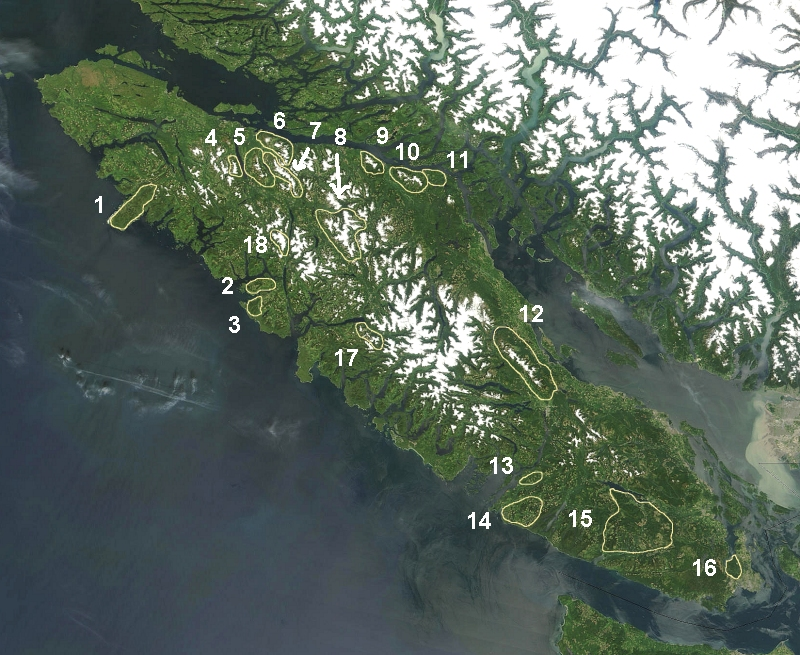
- The Sutton Range is marked 8 on map

Dimensions
- Area: 448 km^{2} (173 mi^{2})

Geography
- Location within British Columbia
- Country: Canada
- Region: British Columbia
- Parent range: Vancouver Island Ranges

The Sutton Range is a mountain range on Vancouver Island, British Columbia, Canada, located in the area between the headwaters of the Nimpkish River and those of the White River. It has an area of 448 km^{2} and is a subrange of the Vancouver Island Ranges which in turn form part of the Insular Mountains.

== See also ==
- List of mountain ranges
