= Adam River =

River in British Columbia, Canada

Coordinates: 50°27′57″N 126°16′38″W

Adam River is a river on northern Vancouver Island, British Columbia, Canada, flowing north into the Johnstone Strait northwest of the community of Sayward. The Adam's main tributary is the Eve River. The Kwak'wala name for the river is He-la-de, meaning "land of plenty", a reference to abundant berries, birds, game, and salmon. That name is reflected in that of Haylahte Indian Reserve No. 3, which is on the east bank of the Adam's mouth. The former Matilpi village of Klaywatse was located on an island in the river's estuary.

== See also ==
- List of rivers of British Columbia
