= Amora Bettany =

Brazilian video game artist

- Born: 1987 (age 38–39)
- Occupation: Video game artist
- Notable work: Out There Somewhere, Celeste and TowerFall
- Website: https://amora.ink/

Amora Bettany (born Raquel, 1987) is a Brazilian video game artist based in Vancouver. Her work can be seen in Out There Somewhere (2012), TowerFall (2013), and Celeste (2018). She prefers to work on concept and high resolution art, which is later pixelated by her partner Pedro Medeiros or used in game as it is.

== Biography ==
Bettany was born in São Paulo in 1987. As a teenager, she created independent comics and sold them at conventions. Her first professional art job was as a clean-up artist at an animation studio, where she supported the production of Rio 2096: A Story of Love and Fury (2013). She went on to work at other studios where she worked on Chico and Rita (2010) and The Princess and the Frog (2009).

In 2010, Bettany was doing freelance animation and illustration while working on small independent games as a hobby. Eventually, video game art became her fulltime job.

Bettany formed Miniboss with Pedro Medeiros and Heidy Motta, a video game studio, in 2010. In 2019, she moved to Vancouver from São Paulo to join the Extremely OK Games team in-person to work on the project code-named EXOK1. After several scrapped projects, the studio announced Earthblade in 2021, but this game was also canceled in 2025 after she and other members of Extremely OK Games left the team following a conflict concerning the intellectual property rights of Celeste.

== Games ==
Game	Role	Year
Out There Somewhere	Game Design/Art/Writing	2012
Deep Dungeons of Doom	Game Design/Art/Writing	2013
TowerFall	Character Design/Concept Art/Localization	2014
Celeste	Writing/Concept Art/Animation/Promo art/Localization	2018
Iconoclasts	Testing	2018
Celeste 64: Fragments of the Mountain	Co-creator	2024
Wanderstop	Concept art	2025
