= FOTM =

FOTM may refer to:

- FOTM - Friends of Old Time Music, an album featuring Roscoe Holcomb
- FAQ of the month, a feature of the GameFAQs website
- Celeste 64: Fragments of the Mountain, a 2024 video game
