= Out There Somewhere =

2016 video game

- Steam header art
- Developer: MiniBoss
- Publishers: MiniBoss; EQGAMES
- Designers: Pedro Medeiros; Amora Bettany
- Artists: Pedro Medeiros; Amora Bettany
- Composer: Iuri Rodrigues
- Engine: GameMaker
- Platforms: Windows, OS X
- Release: 2012 (Original); March 14, 2016 (Steam)
- Genre: Puzzle-platform
- Mode: Single-player

Out There Somewhere is a puzzle-platform game developed by Pedro Medeiros and Amora Bettany as MiniBoss and published by EQGAMES. It was released in 2012, but was later released to Steam on March 14, 2016.

In the game, the player controls a spaceman exploring an alien planet. Armed with a portal gun, his goal is to escape the planet and defeat an evil presence on it known as Grigori.

== Gameplay ==
Tutorial explaining the portal gun mechanic

Out There Somewhere plays as a standard platformer, with the twist being that the player character, Yuri, is armed with a portal gun, which, when fired, shoots out a blue plasma-like bullet that teleports Yuri to wherever it hits. Later, he also obtains a gun which allows him to kill enemies and break blocks, and it is also possible to collect upgrades to Yuri's health and his spaceship.

== Plot ==
Yuri, the captain of a spaceship, is fighting against an enemy force, until his ship becomes badly damaged. He is forced to land on an alien planet, and there he attempts to find a power source known as a Lightorb to fix his ship. He soon learns of an evil overlord of the planet named Grigori, and after defeating him and obtaining the Lightorb, Yuri fights Grigori in his spaceship, and wins, although Grigori manages to get away.

== Reception ==
Out There Somewhere was met with very positive reviews. Christian Donlan of Eurogamer wrote "It's wonderfully creative... I'm not sure I can recommend it enough." and Kevin Alexander of GameZebo wrote that it "might just be the best puzzle platformer you'll play this year".
