= Madeline (Celeste) =

Character in the 2018 video game Celeste

- Celeste character
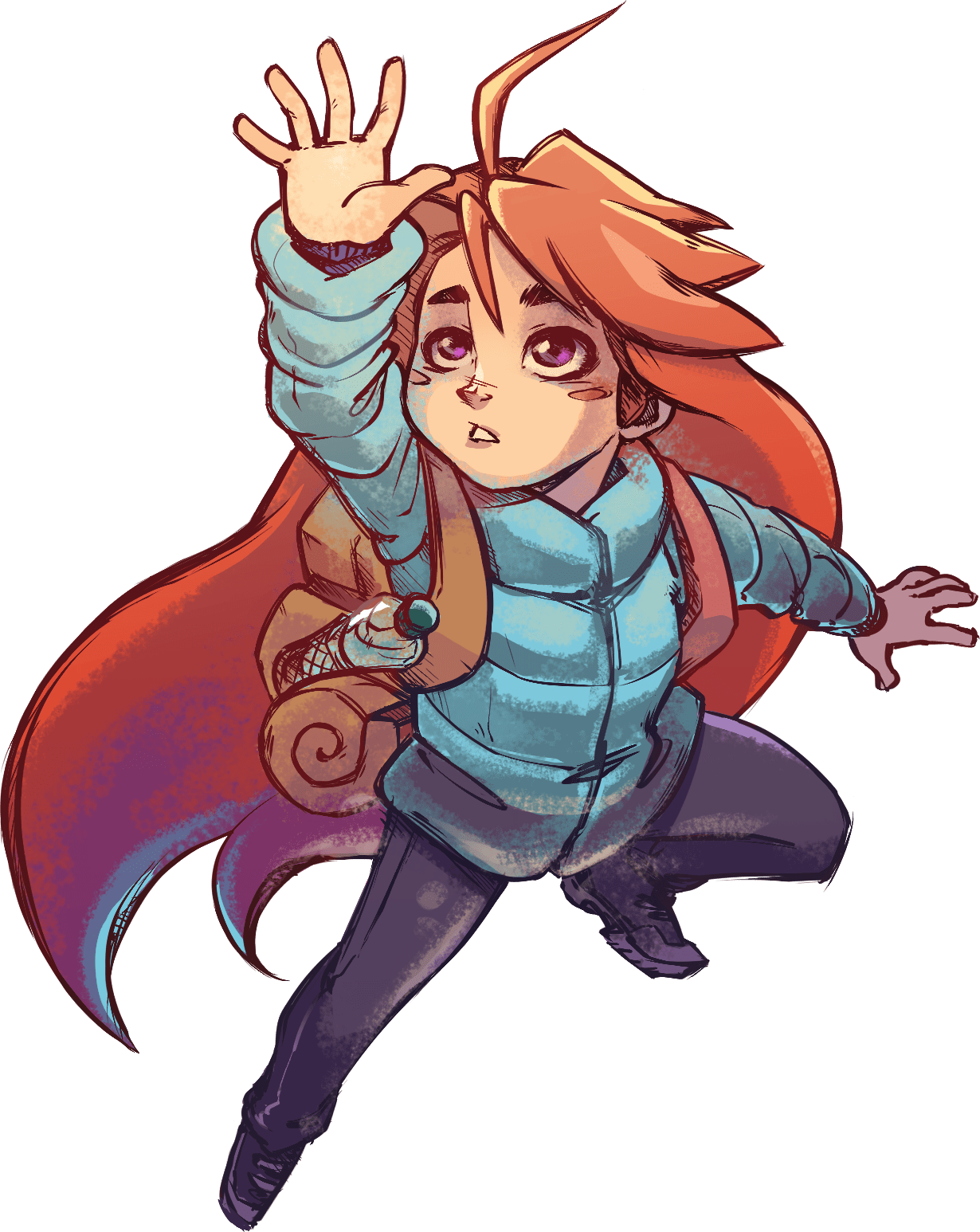
- Madeline, as she appears in official artwork
- First game: Celeste (2018)
- Created by: Maddy Thorson

Madeline is a fictional character who serves as the protagonist of the video game Celeste by Maddy Thorson. Throughout the game, she climbs the titular Mount Celeste, simultaneously dealing with anxiety and other personal struggles. The character is notable as one of the few transgender protagonist characters in the video game industry: her identity as a trans woman was confirmed by Thorson in 2020, after the release of Farewell, a downloadable content expansion pack for Celeste, which received significant media coverage.

== Concept and creation ==
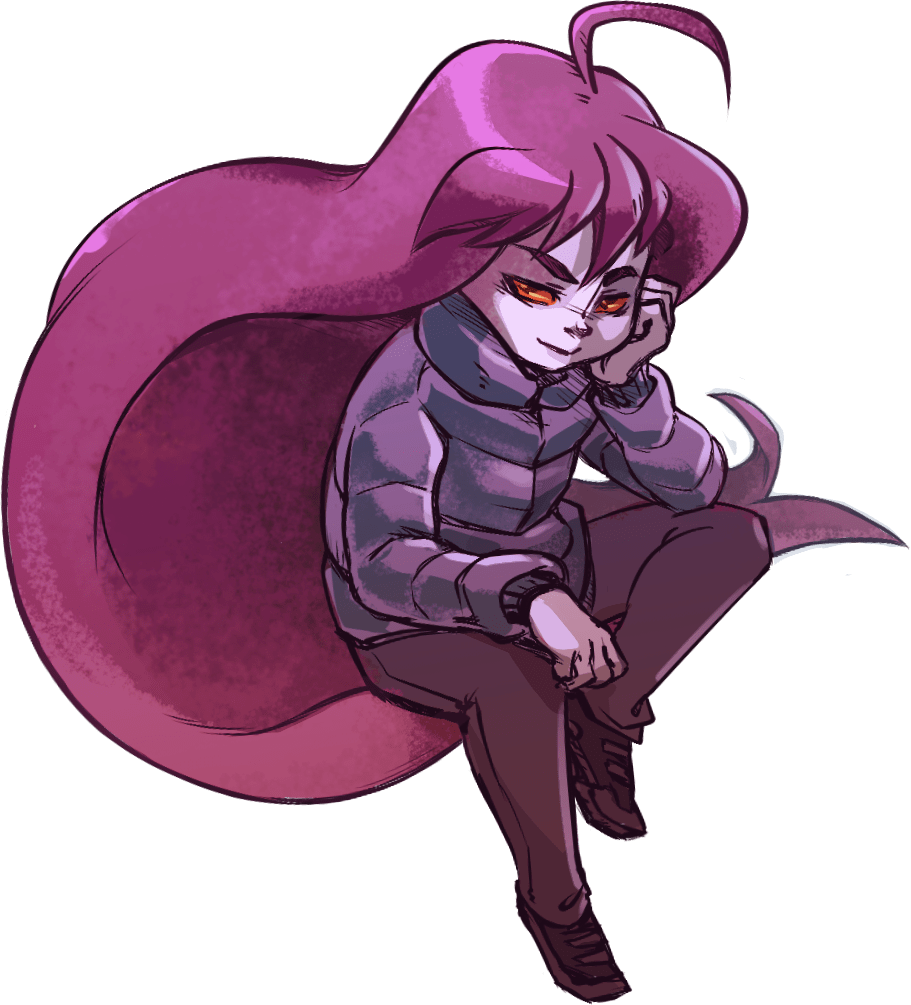
Official artwork of Badeline, Madeline's alter ego who represents her depression and anxiety

The concept of Badeline—a physical representation of Madeline's depression and anxiety, known as "Part of Me" in-game—as well as the premise of taking care of one's self, was based on creator Maddy Thorson's own experiences. She cites Madeline's dealings with the character Mr. Oshiro as an example, where she sacrifices her own self-care to care for someone else. Thorson wrote Madeline with the understanding that she would fall off the mountain and eventually climb her way back up, but she did not know how it would be framed. Thorson came to understand how to frame the scene better once she came to better manage her own anxiety. She notes how the story has Madeline initially trying to fight Badeline, and that over time she learns how to function with it. Thorson notes, however, that this is a part of a process, and that she wanted to make players aware that Madeline was still grappling with an internal conflict at the end of the story. Madeline was eventually announced to be a trans woman, though Thorson did not initially design her to be transgender. The discussion about Madeline's identity helped her both figure out Madeline's gender identity as well as be public with her own.

The music of Celeste was designed by Lena Raine, who composed the music with the main intention of conveying Madeline's feelings, saying it's "almost 1:1 with her internal state". Raine discussed how Madeline's journey is one of "self-discovery and acceptance". She intended this to help players get into Madeline's state of mind.

== Appearances ==
Madeline is the protagonist of Celeste, where she climbs Celeste Mountain, a fictional version of Mount Celeste, while dealing with issues such as anxiety and depression. She meets several characters along the way, including an older woman who calls herself Granny, an explorer from Seattle called Theo, a part of herself known as Badeline, and a spirit named Mr. Oshiro who owns a decrepit hotel. As she climbs the mountain, she runs into various obstacles, including Badeline, who attempts to deter her from climbing any further. Madeline helps Theo through Mr. Oshiro's hotel, and later Theo helps Madeline deal with an anxiety attack while riding a gondola that breaks down, telling her to imagine a feather floating up and down. She later attempts this method when Badeline is trying to discourage her further, causing Badeline to send her down. Madeline eventually makes up with Badeline, and they work together to reach the summit. After this, they return to the base, and Madeline makes a pie using her collectable strawberries for all of the other characters.

When TowerFall, an earlier game by Maddy Thorson, was ported to the Nintendo Switch, Madeline and Badeline were added as playable characters.

The 2024 freeware game Celeste 64: Fragments of the Mountain takes place after Celeste and features the same cast, including Madeline as the protagonist.

== Critical reception ==
Madeline has received generally positive reception for her appearance in Celeste, with the Venture Beat staff naming her the best new character of 2018 and praising her for how well she resonated with them. Emily Heller of Polygon commented that she related to Madeline and how she struggles with mental illness. Heller went on to include her in the list of the best video game characters of the 2010s, calling her the "most relatable character of the decade" for people with anxiety and depression. Fellow Polygon contributor Jeff Ramos felt similarly, finding it inspiring how Madeline uses her challenges to help herself. Kyle LeClair of Hardcore Gamer praised Madeline's growth in Celeste, calling her "snarky but lovable." Tom Marks of IGN felt the mixture of Celeste's gameplay and story helped him better connect with Madeline. Jenna of Autostraddle found her story relatable, also noting that the way she speaks when scared or hurt "hurt [her] heart." She also praised how she grew through the journey. Matt Gerardi of The A.V. Club was thankful to see the game "discuss mental illness in a more respectful, frank way".

After the release of the Chapter 9: Farewell downloadable content, and prior to later confirmation, whether Madeline is transgender had been the subject of discussion, due to the downloadable content showing that Madeline's bedroom has a trans flag, a childhood photo of her with very short hair and a prescription bottle. People in the LGBTQ community were enthused by her potential status as a trans woman, due to the popularity of Celeste and "a sense of marginalization in both society and mass media." It was also the subject of controversy for some people, politically and religiously, with some hateful messages aimed at the game and character. Ali Jones of PCGamesN cited Madeline's body dysmorphia, her estrangement from family members, and her struggling with a "shadow version of herself" as reasons for why she might be transgender. Kat Bailey of USGamer suggested that the game may be suggesting Madeline to be transgender while also noting that it is only one part of her identity. Maddy Thorson, the original game developer, has since confirmed that Madeline is canonically transgender. Thorson also came out as transgender herself in the same post, stating: "During Celeste's development, I did not know that Madeline or myself were trans. During the Farewell DLC's development, I began to form a hunch. Post-development, I now know that we both are."
