= Parkitect =

2018 video game

- Developer: Texel Raptor
- Publishers: Texel Raptor; BlitWorks (console)
- Producer: Jada Gibbs
- Designers: Sebastian Mayer; Garret Randell
- Programmers: Sebastian Mayer; Tim Potze; Luuk Holleman; Patrick Wolschon
- Artists: Garret Randell; Gabby DaRienzo; Fabrice Magdanz; Julian Andino
- Composer: Gordon McGladdery
- Engine: Unity
- Platforms: Windows; macOS; Linux; PlayStation 4; PlayStation 5; Xbox One; Xbox Series X/S
- Release: Windows, macOS, Linux; November 29, 2018; PS4, PS5, Xbox One, Xbox Series X/S; July 3, 2024
- Genre: Construction and management simulation
- Modes: Single-player, multiplayer

Parkitect is a construction and management simulation video game developed and published by Texel Raptor. After a successful Kickstarter campaign and a two-year-long early access beta period, the game was released on November 29, 2018. Parkitect simulates amusement park management, reminiscent of the RollerCoaster Tycoon series. A console port was released on PlayStation 4, PlayStation 5, Xbox One and Xbox Series X/S on July 3, 2024.

== Gameplay ==
An in-game screenshot

The general premise of the game is to open, build, and successfully maintain an amusement park, similar to the RollerCoaster Tycoon series. The player must build a multitude of attractions, manage the park, and keep their guests happy. The player may hire staff to fulfil the needs of the park. Parkitect introduces several aspects that differentiate from the classic RollerCoaster Tycoon series including staff buildings, resource depots, and hidden staff-only areas. Furthermore, the game introduces a branching map system within its campaign mode.

The game supports user-created mods, assets and rides, distributed via Steam Workshop.

== Development ==
In March 2014, development started as an attempt to simulate coaster physics before deciding to turn it into a full theme park simulation game. On June 1, 2014, Sebastian Mayer posted a screenshot of the yet-to-be titled game on Reddit. Texel Raptor launched the Kickstarter of the game on August 22, 2014, as Parkitect. By September 2014, the campaign had raised over US$63,730. From then on, Texel Raptor released weekly images and stats regarding the development of the game. Texel Raptor released the pre-alpha to those who pre-ordered and backed the game in September 2015. In April 2016, Texel Raptor announced that Parkitect would be released as an early access game on Steam on May 5, 2016. The game fully released out of early access on November 29, 2018.

An expansion pack, Taste of Adventure, was released on November 20, 2019. In December 2020, a cooperative multiplayer mode that accommodates up to eight players was released for free. The game's second expansion, Booms & Blooms, was released on September 2, 2020.

== Reception ==
Reception

Aggregate score
Aggregator	Score
Metacritic	83/100 (PC); 68/100 (XBSX)

Review scores
Publication	Score
Destructoid	9/10
Eurogamer	Recommended
PC Gamer (US)	77/100

The game received "generally positive reviews", according to review aggregator website Metacritic. Alex Donaldson of VG247 praised the game, claiming that the game is connected "to the first two sprite-based RCT games [as] Planet Coaster [is connected] to the later 3D entries." Two years after Parkitect's release on Early Access, Ellen McGrody of PC Gamer noted that the game "has grown from a simple recreation of the isometric rollercoaster sim to an evolution of it". Right before the game's release, Matt Wales of Eurogamer wrote that the game already possessed a "thriving" modding scene.
