= Celeste (video game) =

2018 video game

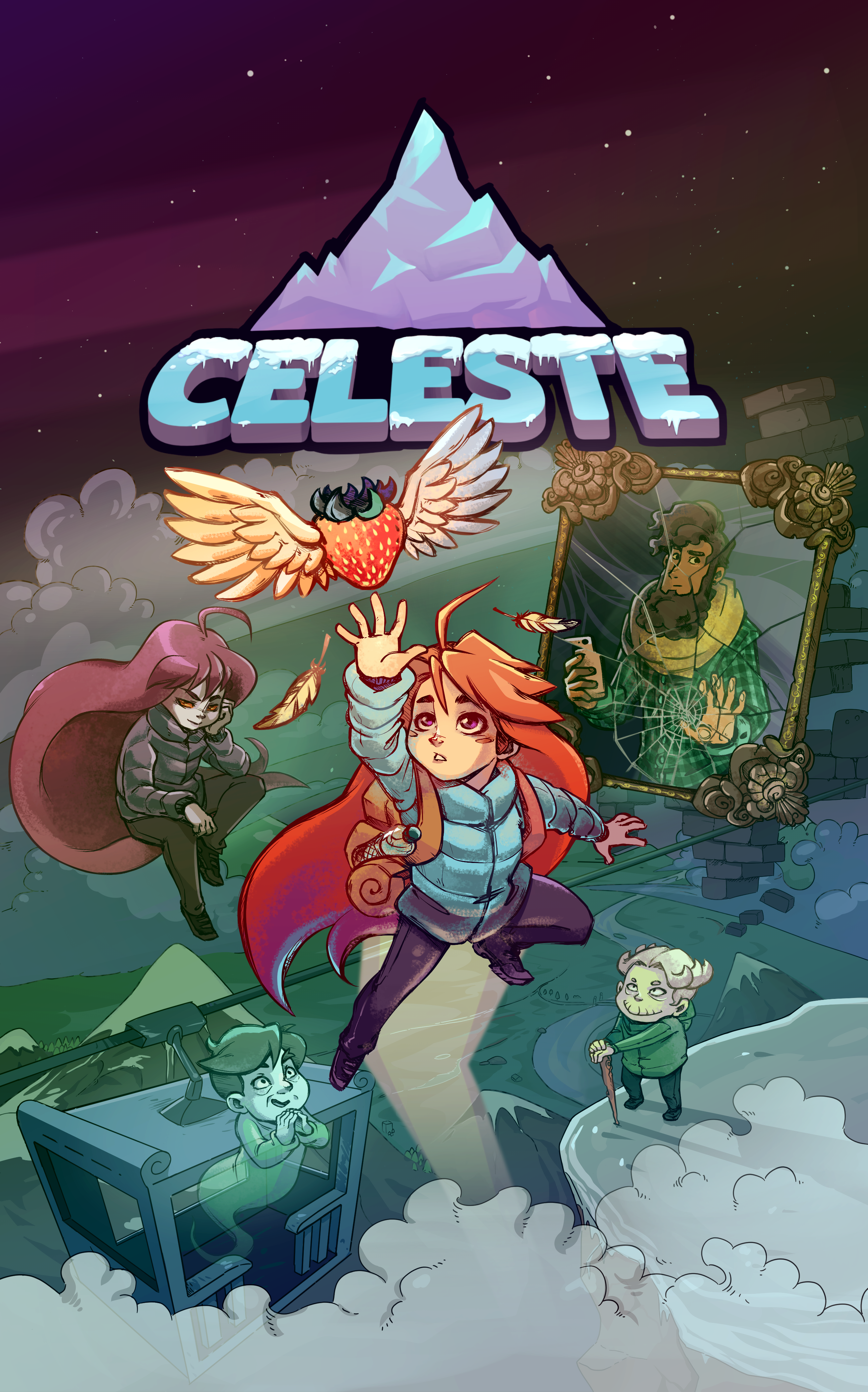
- Cover artwork, depicting (from left to right) Badeline, Oshiro, Madeline, Granny, and Theo
- Developer: Maddy Makes Games
- Publisher: Maddy Makes Games
- Director: Maddy Thorson
- Programmers: Maddy Thorson; Noel Berry
- Artists: Noel Berry; Amora Bettany; Gabby DaRienzo; Pedro Medeiros
- Writer: Maddy Thorson
- Composer: Lena Raine
- Engine: Microsoft XNA
- Platforms: Linux; macOS; Nintendo Switch; PlayStation 4; Windows; Xbox One; Google Stadia
- Release: PC, Switch, PS4; WW: January 25, 2018; Xbox One; WW: January 26, 2018; Google Stadia; WW: July 28, 2020
- Genre: Platform
- Modes: Single-player
- License: MIT (player code and Celeste Classic minigame only)

Celeste is a 2018 platform video game developed and published by indie studio Maddy Makes Games. The player controls the player character Madeline, a young woman with anxiety and depression, who endeavors to climb Celeste Mountain, a fictional version of Mount Celeste. During her climb, she encounters several characters, including a personification of her self-doubt nicknamed "Badeline", who attempts to stop her from reaching the mountain's summit.

Development of Celeste began in August 2015, when game developers Maddy Thorson and Noel Berry created a version of Celeste for the PICO-8 during the course of a weekend; Thorson, who served as producer, and Berry, who served as the lead programmer, wanted to expand the PICO-8 version into a full game. Inspired in part by Super Mario Bros. 3 (1988) and Thorson's own TowerFall (2013), the gameplay was designed to be minimal and to mirror the feeling of bouldering. Celeste was designed to be accessible, featuring game mechanics and an "Assist Mode" that make the game more forgiving and less challenging. To create a more "introspective" game, the developers added themes of self-forgiveness into the narrative, which grew to become intertwined with the gameplay. Celeste's soundtrack was composed by Lena Raine.

Celeste released on January 25, 2018, for Linux, macOS, Nintendo Switch, PlayStation 4, and Windows, releasing for Xbox One the following day. It was also released for Google Stadia in July 2020. Upon release, the game received widespread acclaim from critics. Reviewers praised the interplay of its narrative and gameplay, and lauded its player movement and controls. Critics also appreciated its approach to difficulty and accessibility, and its depictions of depression and anxiety. Celeste's music and its pixel art style was also praised. Since October 29, 2026, Celeste has been delisted from the Xbox storefronts in support of the BDS boycott.

Since its release, Celeste has been considered by some video game journalists to be among the greatest video games of all time, and it has garnered a dedicated fandom and active speedrunning and modding communities. On September 9, 2019, a free downloadable content (DLC) expansion named Farewell was released, introducing a new chapter to the game. The game's developers have rejected the possibility of a sequel to Celeste, though they have created small-scale spin-offs: Celeste 2: Lani's Trek, a sequel to the original PICO-8 version, was released for Celeste's third anniversary in 2021; Celeste 64: Fragments of the Mountain, a short sequel with three-dimensional gameplay, was released for its sixth anniversary in 2024.

== Gameplay ==
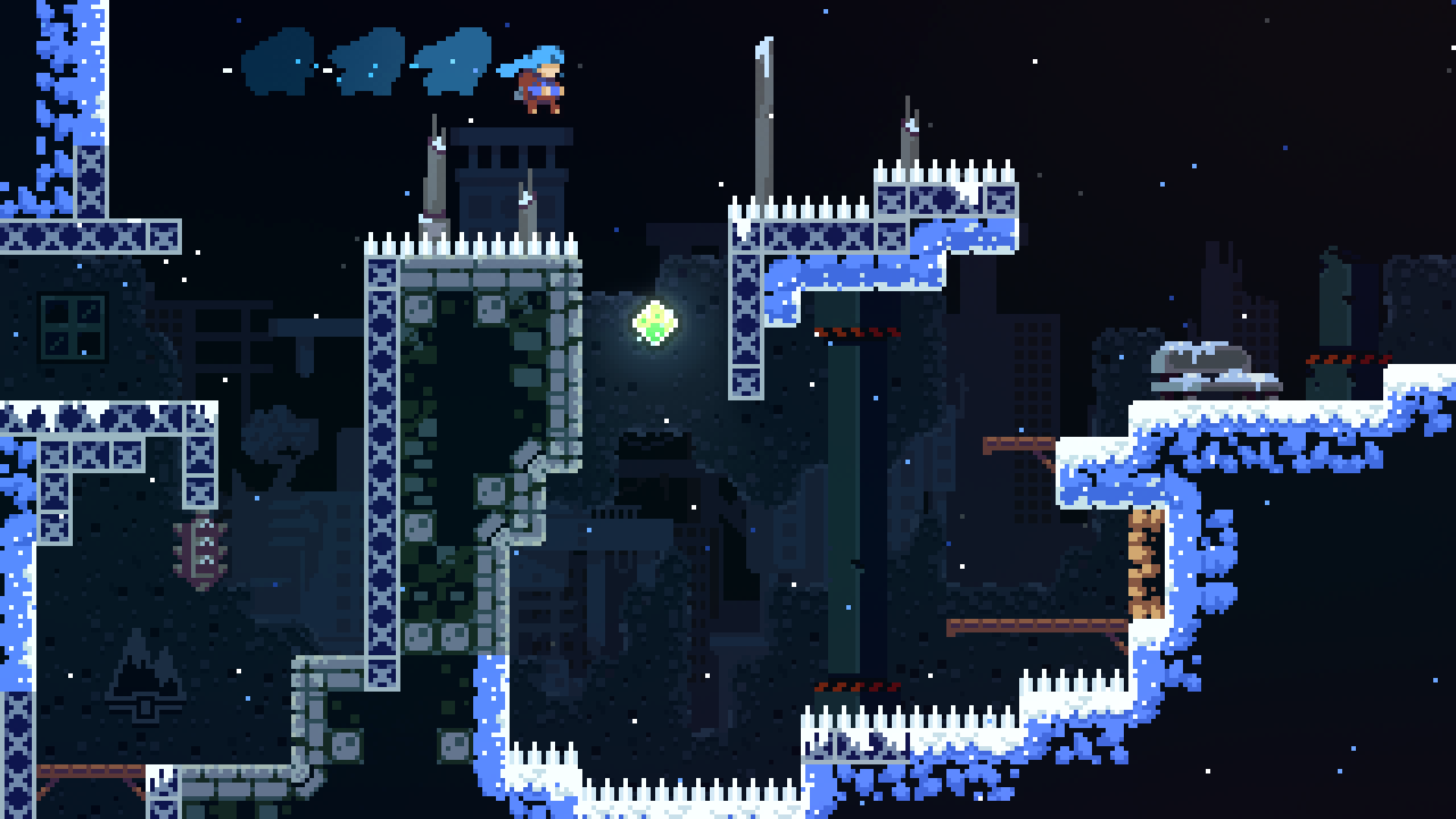
In Celeste, the player-controlled Madeline is able to perform a midair dash in any one of eight directions.

Celeste is a two-dimensional platforming game. The player controls Madeline, who has the ability to run, jump, climb walls for a limited time, wall jump, and dash in mid-air in one of eight directions. Certain objects grant Madeline additional abilities. Green gems refill her dash ability without the need to land on the ground. Other objects include "dream blocks" that transport her from one side to another when dashed into, moving blocks that can transfer their momentum to Madeline when jumped off, bubbles that move her when touched, and platforms that move after she dashes. The difficulty can be lowered through the use of an "Assist Mode", a setting that provides accessibility options including a lowered game speed, unlimited use of the dash ability, or the option to grant Madeline invincibility.

The base game consists of eight chapters and a free DLC that are all divided into multiple single-screen challenges, with checkpoints in between screens. Chapters contain branching paths that lead to optional challenges and hidden collectibles, including red or golden strawberries, cassette tapes, and crystal hearts that unlock gates in levels. Some chapters contain a boss character. Each of the eight chapters has a "B-side" level that reuses mechanics from the main level to create a more difficult experience. Each B-side level can be unlocked by locating the hidden cassette tape in its corresponding level. After the player completes all eight B-sides, "C-side" levels are unlocked; they are shorter in length but with increased difficulty. The Farewell expansion adds a ninth chapter with no B-side or C-side and no red strawberries, and adds grabbable jellyfish that function as parachutes, exploding pufferfish that can launch Madeline, and "double-dash" gems that give Madeline two dashes when collected.

== Plot ==
Celeste takes place on a fictional version of Mount Celeste containing several areas. It is seemingly haunted, housing many strange occurrences. The protagonist, a young woman named Madeline, decides to climb the mountain to challenge her anxiety, stubbornly persisting until she reaches its summit. Upon arriving at the mountain's base, she meets an elderly woman called Granny, who warns her against climbing it. After ignoring her advice, Madeline encounters an abandoned city wherein she meets Theo, a social media-obsessed traveler from Seattle. In the next area, Madeline experiences a nightmare in which she encounters a part of herself in the mirror, a personification of her anxiety and depression called "Badeline", who chases her out of the area. Badeline doubts Madeline's ability to successfully reach the summit, and says she will stop Madeline from continuing to save her from climbing unprepared, describing herself as Madeline's "pragmatic part".

Madeline then enters the Celestial Resort, an abandoned hotel, and meets Oshiro. Oshiro, a ghost who owns the abandoned resort, struggles to leave his past behind and lives in denial. He tries to convince Madeline to stay and improve the resort's poor condition. After she agrees, Badeline appears and taunts Oshiro, saying that Madeline only helped him to fuel her own ego. Believing Badeline, he becomes enraged and chases Madeline out of the resort. After navigating a windy ridge, Madeline reaches Theo at a gondola lift. Badeline halts the gondola's motion, causing Madeline to have a panic attack; Theo helps to calm her down. The two arrive at an ancient temple, where Theo gets trapped inside a crystal until Madeline frees him. After speaking to Theo, Madeline gains the confidence to confront Badeline and says she wants to abandon her. In retaliation, Badeline throws her down the mountain. Madeline then finds Granny, who suggests that she seek resolution instead of abandonment. Madeline then searches for Badeline, and after a chase, Madeline apologizes to her. The two reconcile and vow to climb together. After reaching the summit, they enjoy a strawberry pie with Granny, Theo, and Oshiro.

About a year later, Madeline meets with Granny to explore the mountain's core. The two go on to develop a connection to each other before Granny dies. Mourning her death, Madeline visits her grave. Madeline sees a mysterious bird at Granny's grave. Believing the bird to be her reincarnation, she decides to pursue it through space in hopes of locating Granny. Badeline is against this idea and abandons Madeline, forcing her to chase the bird alone. Badeline later returns, attempting to warn Madeline that she is dreaming and that she needs to wake up. Despite initially refusing, Madeline later concedes and instead decides to free the bird. Madeline meets Granny in a cloud-filled area and apologizes for not attending her funeral. After waking up, Madeline is seen speaking to Theo on a video call, who reveals that Granny was friends with his grandfather.

== Development ==
=== Conception ===
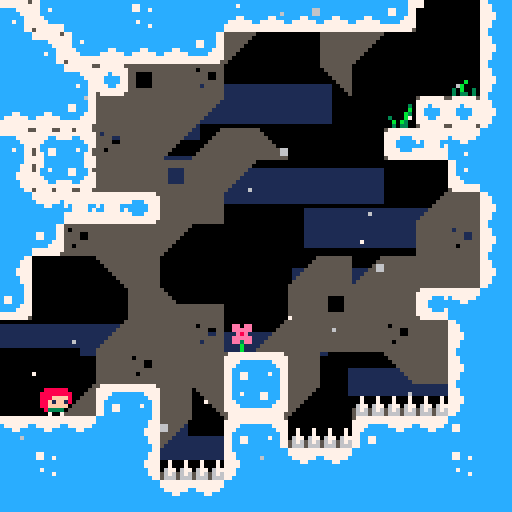
The PICO-8 prototype of Celeste

The original version of Celeste was developed by Maddy Thorson and Noel Berry in August 2015 for the PICO-8, a fantasy video game console, in three days. Due in part to time limitations, Thorson and Berry wanted core gameplay to be minimal with additional mechanics to add complexity, for which they felt the idea of a character struggling to climb a mountain was fitting. The initial prototype was titled "Everest". They decided that the project would be a single-player adventure from its initial conception, with lessons from the development of Thorson's previous game, TowerFall (2013), carried over into the game. After the development of the PICO-8 version, retroactively titled Celeste Classic, the team wanted to expand the game with additional development time and fewer restrictions. Celeste Classic was added to Celeste as a hidden minigame. Celeste was produced by Thorson, and Berry served as the lead programmer. The development team underwent crunch during the final months of development.

=== Gameplay and accessibility ===
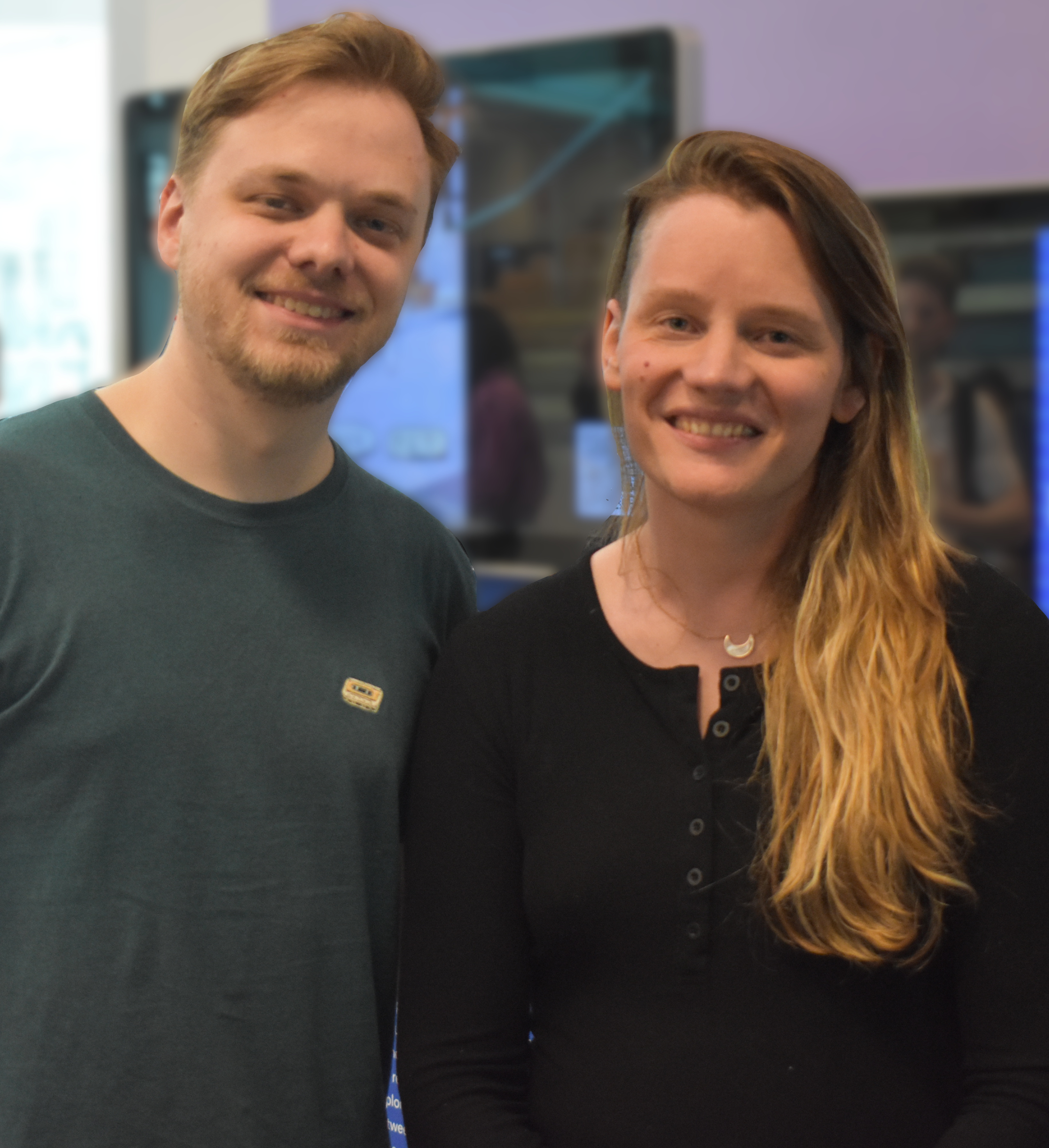
Noel Berry (left) and Maddy Thorson (right), Celeste's lead programmer and director, respectively

Thorson and Berry cited multiple games as influencing Celeste's gameplay, including Metroid (1986), Donkey Kong Country 2 (1995), and Kero Blaster (2014). Thorson said Super Mario Bros. 3 (1988) was the game that most inspired Celeste, particularly for its approach to problem-solving. Shacknews and Kill Screen said Celeste's level design was reminiscent of levels created by Thorson in Super Mario Maker (2015).

Thorson wanted Madeline's moveset to be minimal while emulating the feeling of bouldering, which inspired Madeline's limited stamina when climbing walls; the stamina system was further shaped by the importance of vertical space given by the mountain-climbing theme. Due to the gameplay requiring more precise control, the developers chose not to use a pre-existing physics engine so they could predetermine outcomes for certain situations. The precise gameplay also influenced the art style, as the team felt that pixel art could more clearly convey information to the player, in addition to the team's familiarity with the style. The team frequently adjusted Madeline's attributes and redesigned levels.

During the design phase, the team wanted Celeste to feel difficult yet fair to the player, and modified or removed levels or mechanics they deemed unfairly difficult. The team prioritized matching the player's intent over requiring near-perfect execution, though challenges later in the game require more precision. Several mechanics contribute to this, including "coyote time", which allows players to jump for a small moment after leaving the ground, named after Looney Tunes character Wile E. Coyote's ability to become suspended in midair and only fall once made aware of the situation. Additional mechanics include the ability for a jump to be input slightly before touching the ground, a mechanic that simulates rounded corners to prevent the player from colliding with a corner, and one that allows players to jump off a wall while slightly in front of it rather than requiring direct contact. The mechanics were designed to allow Celeste to be either hardcore or forgiving, depending on the player's preference. The game was further designed to make more difficult challenges have a more clear solution.

Systems like strawberries, B-sides, and Assist Mode were designed to allow the player to customize the difficulty of Celeste. Thorson said that the ability of Assist Mode to make the game less challenging served as a counterbalance to the optional content such as strawberries, which make it more challenging. The implementation of an accessibility mode was decided on after observing public discourse surrounding Cuphead (2017) that originated after many players felt that the game was too difficult or unforgiving. This mode was initially titled "Cheat Mode", but Thorson felt that the name was too judgmental and decided on "Assist Mode" as an alternative. She said the mode was added late into development, and Berry added that it took only "a couple of days' work" to develop, though balancing the game as a whole required extensive playtesting.

=== Story and themes ===
Thorson wrote Celeste's story. At the start of development, the team had little direction for the story, but wanted it to be more introspective than TowerFall and were inspired by Studio Ghibli films such as Spirited Away (2001). The inspiration for Celeste's story came during development, when Thorson reached a "breaking point" where her depression and anxiety became too severe to be ignored. She wanted to explore those ideas in the game, but creating a narrative around her experiences was difficult because her struggles persisted during development. When writing the story, the team did not consult mental health professionals and chose to write based only on their own experiences, making the story personal and relatable instead of representative of mental illness as a whole. The developers were surprised by the large role played by the story in Celeste, and their decision to delay the game was made to "do the story justice", properly connect it to the gameplay, and make Madeline's experiences in the narrative reflect the player's experiences in the gameplay.

The ending was undecided for most of development. Thorson initially knew she wanted Madeline to fall down the mountain before ultimately reaching the summit, but did not know how it would be executed or framed within the story as a whole. She later decided to show the player that Madeline's struggles were not "magically better" after she reached the summit, and that Madeline's attempt to rid herself of anxiety by forcing her 'other self' into submission was incorrect and that she instead must learn to exist alongside it. After development, Thorson said that because she was "in the process of discovering her queerness" during development, Celeste's story inadvertently had queer undertones. Thorson said that Madeline was a transgender woman in 2020 after the character appeared with a transgender pride flag during the ending of Farewell, which she said was obvious in retrospect because Madeline's gender identity inadvertently reflected her own. Thorson wrote that she likely would have written Madeline's story differently after she knew they were both trans, but that a lot of the story of Celeste reflected Thorson's journey through the struggle of understanding her own gender identity.

=== Music ===
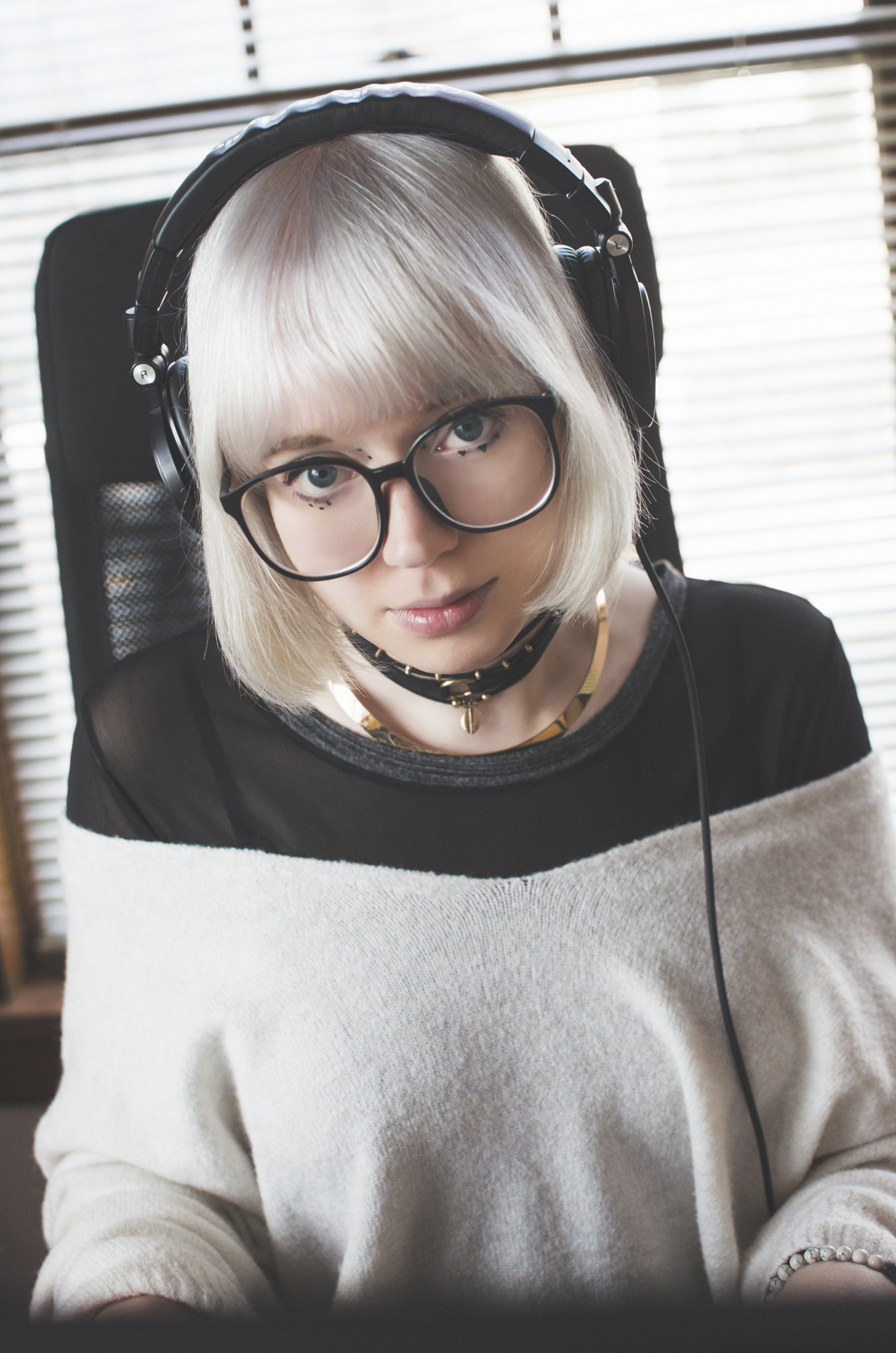
Lena Raine composed the music for Celeste.

Lena Raine composed the majority of Celeste's soundtrack, with additional composers creating remixes of Raine's music for most of the B-side levels. Raine's score informed the visual design for some levels. Sound designer Kevin Regamey added sound effects to the music to mirror gameplay, after which Raine would add "musical ambience".

Specific sounds in the music of Celeste were designed to match certain themes. According to Raine, "In the Mirror" was one of the strangest tracks she has composed. Its synthesizer-heavy sequences, noted by Raine to be reminiscent of Vangelis and Blade Runner (1982), were designed to match the "cosmic horrors" experienced by Madeline. In "Resurrections", she created an "othering" sound that transitioned from the more simple melodic progression of "First Steps", and an "ethereal sound evocative of a space that didn't seem quite real", as the song would play during a lucid dream sequence. "In the Mirror" includes vocals performed by Raine as Madeline's internal dialogue, reversed due to the theming of mirrors. When developing the song, she wanted there to be a sound nearly unintelligible and spoken in the background. She decided to record herself in a dark closet, attempting to vocalize what she related to in Madeline's struggles. According to Raine, she tries to "inject some part" of herself into her musical projects.

Each character in Celeste is represented by their own instrument. Madeline is represented by a piano, Badeline is represented by a synthesizer, Theo is represented by guitar, and Oshiro is represented by a "theremin-like" synthesizer. Granny is an exception, as, according to Raine, "she embodies the power of the mountain and is a fairly omnipresent figure". Badeline's theme, a motif that first appears in "Resurrections" and later reappears in several other tracks, is written entirely in a minor key, in contrast to Madeline's, which is "primarily cheery" and only occasionally transitions into a minor key. In the song "Anxiety", Raine attempted to capture the feeling of a panic attack and made the piano theme representative of Madeline be "engulfed" by the synthesizer representative of Badeline.

=== Farewell ===
The Farewell expansion began development following a long break after release, and was developed in conjunction with the team's next project, Earthblade. Initially planned to be a self-contained collection of extremely difficult levels, the expansion later grew in scope to include a new narrative continuing from the story of the base game. Farewell was released at no additional cost, which Thorson said was possible only due to the financial success of Celeste. Raine returned to compose the soundtrack for Farewell.

== Marketing and release ==
Celeste was announced in July 2016, and Thorson and Berry livestreamed themselves developing the game on Twitch. The next month, a demo of the game was made playable at PAX West's Indie Megabooth. Celeste was initially announced for release in 2017, as Thorson and Berry wanted it to release as a launch game for the then-upcoming Nintendo Switch in March 2017. By December 2016, its release window had been changed to "mid-2017". The next February, a full trailer was released, showcasing Celeste's gameplay. In April 2017, the development team published the first post for an Instagram account written in-character as Theo. The series of images framed as Theo's selfies served as a prelude to the events of Celeste, detailing Theo's backstory and journey to Celeste Mountain.

Celeste released on January 25, 2018, on the Nintendo Switch, PlayStation 4, Microsoft Windows, macOS, and Linux, and it would be released on Xbox One the following day. On July 9, 2020, it was announced that the game would be releasing on the cloud gaming service Google Stadia. It was added to the collection of games included for free with Stadia Pro—a subscription-based version of Stadia—on September 29.

Madeline and Badeline appeared as crossover characters in the Nintendo Switch version of TowerFall, released on September 27, 2018. In October 2018, Scarlet Moon Records announced Prescription for Sleep: Celeste, an album of Celeste cover songs described by Nintendo Life as "lullaby-style renditions" of the game's soundtrack. Prescription for Sleep: Celeste features violin by Maiko, saxophone by Norihiko Hibino, and piano by AYAKI, with Raine serving as co-producer. An open pre-order window for a Celeste collector's edition produced by Limited Run Games began on January 1, 2019. On January 21, it was announced that the game's soundtrack would receive an album of piano covers by Trevor Alan Gomes, titled Celeste Piano Collections, a part of the Piano Collections series by Materia Collective, released on January 25. In July, Materia Collective purchased the publishing rights for the music, and the composers of the game's B-side music went without royalties for 17 months. For its fifth anniversary in January 2023, it was announced that a new Celeste collector's edition from Fangamer would release that June.

In December 2018, Thorson announced that additional downloadable content (DLC) levels for Celeste would be released in "early 2019". The final chapter of Celeste, Farewell, was released as free DLC on September 9, 2019, though the team said the Xbox One version would have a slight delay. In October 2026, Maddy Makes Games delisted the Xbox One versions of Celeste and TowerFall from the Microsoft Store in solidarity with other independent developers such as House House, Ice Water and Dan Dilorio who supported the Boycott, Divestment and Sanctions movement against suppliers to the Israel Defense Forces, which included Microsoft.

=== Sales ===
By the end of 2018, the soundtrack of Celeste had been streamed over 4 million times on Spotify and purchased over 6,000 times. That same year, the game sold over 500,000 units, with the Nintendo Switch version reportedly being the most popular. Prior to the release of Farewell, Thorson said that Celeste was "coming up on a million copies soon"—it had reached that number by March 2020. As of January 2025, Celeste had sold 1.7 million copies since launch.

== Reception ==
Reception

Aggregate scores
Aggregator	Score
Metacritic	92/100 (NS); 91/100 (PS4); 94/100 (XONE); 88/100 (PC)
OpenCritic	99% recommend

Review scores
Publication	Score
Eurogamer	Recommended
Famitsu	8/10, 9/10, 7/10, 7/10
Game Informer	9/10
GameSpot	9/10
Hardcore Gamer	5/5
IGN	10/10
Nintendo Life	10/10
Nintendo World Report	10/10
PC Gamer (US)	80/100
Polygon	8/10
Push Square	8/10
Shacknews	8/10
USgamer	4.5/5
VideoGamer.com	9/10
Ars Technica	Buy
Rock Paper Shotgun	Recommended
Paste	8.5/10

=== Critical response ===
According to review aggregate website Metacritic, Celeste received "universal acclaim" on consoles, and "generally favorable reviews" on PC. Fellow review aggregator OpenCritic assessed that the game received "mighty" approval, being recommended by 99% of critics. Many reviewers described the game as "magnificent" or "special", (Note: Supported by multiple sources: Nintendo Life, Hardcore Gamer, Shacknews, Nintendo World Report, and VideoGamer.com) and IGN called it a "surprise masterpiece". Several critics said Celeste was a game they would recommend to everyone. Reviewers appreciated how the game blended narrative and gameplay; (Note: Supported by multiple sources: GameSpot, Push Square, VideoGamer.com, and IGN) Eurogamer said "everything in Celeste speaks of care and attention". Outlets described the game as "memorable", "hard to put down", and constantly enjoyable.

The gameplay of Celeste was praised. Reviewers felt that its controls and movement were among the best in any game (Note: Supported by multiple sources: Ars Technica, IGN, Wired, and VideoGamer.com) and called them "smooth". Polygon described the game's movement as "consistent" and said they felt "in complete control" at all times. The variety and implementation of game mechanics was praised, while Hardcore Gamer said that Celeste's "genius" came "from simplicity". In-game collectibles were also praised, though Game Informer disliked the lack of significant extrinsic motivation to collect them. Paste wrote that Thorson "mastered level design" with Celeste because the game's difficulty came from the need to achieve objectives rather than discern them.

Celeste's approach to difficulty was lauded by critics. Polygon likened its difficulty to "masocore" games, and many compared Celeste to Super Meat Boy (2010) for their similar difficulty level. (Note: Supported by multiple sources: IGN, Ars Technica, Rock Paper Shotgun, Polygon, Nintendo Life, Game Informer, PC Gamer, Hardcore Gamer, Nintendo World Report, and Paste) Many wrote that the responsibility of failure felt as though it was always their own, (Note: Supported by multiple sources: IGN, Polygon, GameSpot, Push Square, and VideoGamer.com) and that successes felt immensely rewarding. PC Gamer said that Celeste "wields difficulty in a meaningful way", while Shacknews called the game's boss sequences "irksome" for their unpredictability. The inclusion of Assist Mode was praised. (Note: Supported by multiple sources: Rock Paper Shotgun, Nintendo Life, Kotaku, Hardcore Gamer, and Nintendo World Report) Nintendo Life praised its customizability and unintrusiveness, and Rock Paper Shotgun said it solved the problem of difficulty "so elegantly that everyone should be paying attention".

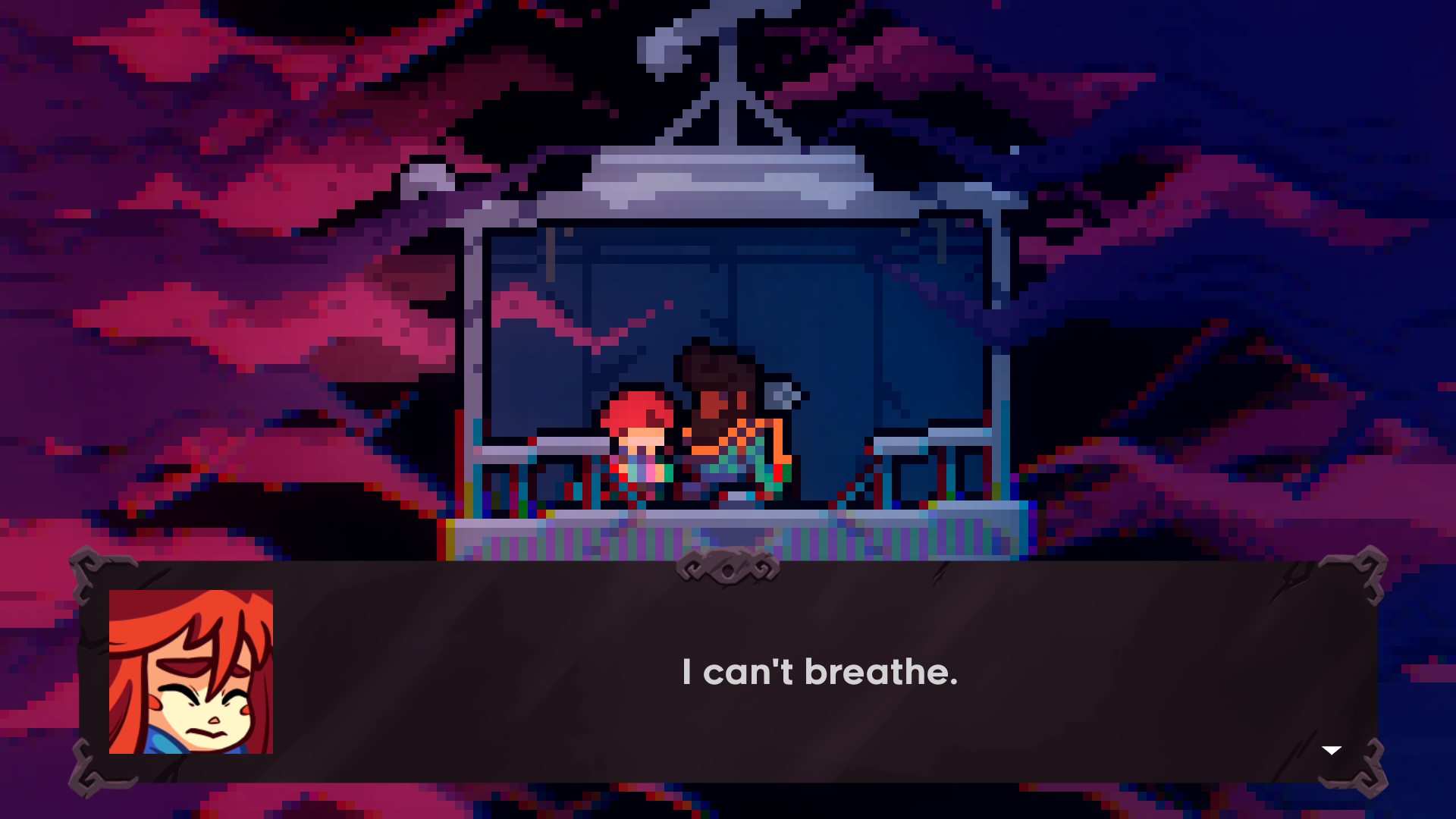
Critics praised Celeste's depiction of anxiety and panic attacks.

Reviewers praised Celeste's plot. Nintendo Life described its setting as "vibrant and fantastical", and some considered the mountain-climbing theme to be a metaphor for life's difficulties. Hardcore Gamer described the game's characters as "terrific" and "memorable", while others described them as "lovable" or easy to relate to. (Note: Supported by multiple sources: IGN, Shacknews, GameSpot, Kotaku, Hardcore Gamer, Nintendo Life, and VideoGamer.com) The dialogue overall was praised, and VideoGamer.com appreciated how it further contributed to the narrative being relatable. The story was considered by critics to be "heartfelt", "touching", or "heartwarming"; (Note: Supported by multiple sources: Shacknews, Polygon, Eurogamer, Paste) some felt that it was a 'timely' narrative, while others found it to be inspirational. Reviewers appreciated the story's reflection of the gameplay, (Note: Supported by multiple sources: GameSpot, Push Square, VideoGamer.com, IGN, and PC Gamer) though Paste said that its execution was "a little awkward", and that "Celeste definitely works better as a game than as a thought-provoking exploration of mental illness", though they otherwise appreciated the game's depiction of depression and anxiety.

The soundtrack of Celeste was praised: Several critics considered it among the best video game soundtracks, and others appreciated how it complemented the gameplay. (Note: Supported by multiple sources: IGN, Ars Technica, Nintendo Life, GameSpot, Kotaku, and Nintendo World Report) IGN said that the music added an "amazing amount of life" to each area, and Kotaku wrote that "Anxiety" in particular captured "the feeling of true anxiety". Reviewers felt that it remained enjoyable to listen to even after extended periods of time, and praised certain aspects of the music, such as the synthesizer and piano portions. Critics also praised the remixes of songs present in the B-side levels.

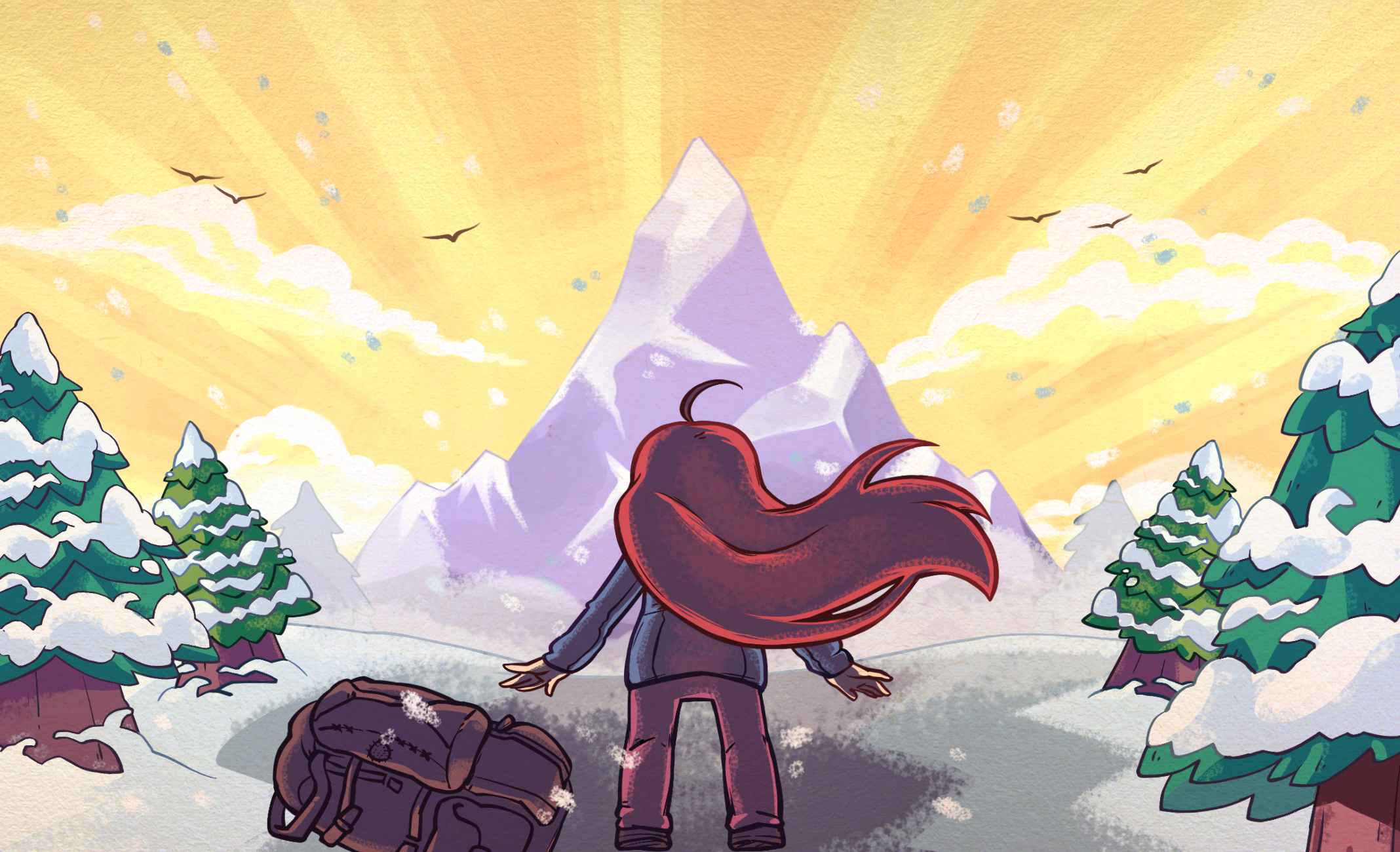
Celeste's art style for its cutscenes was praised in addition to its pixel art.

The visuals and audio were praised too. The game's pixel art was praised by critics (Note: Supported by multiple sources: Ars Technica, Shacknews, Polygon, Nintendo Life, GameSpot, Push Square, Eurogamer, Hardcore Gamer, and Nintendo World Report)—Ars Technica and Nintendo Life lauded its variety, and Polygon said it made the game's characters and environments look "vibrant and memorable". The art style present in cutscenes was also praised, with Eurogamer calling it "beautifully simple", and Nintendo Life and GameSpot appreciating how it complemented the pixel art. Nintendo Life and Rock Paper Shotgun also praised the game's animations.

Reviewing Farewell, Kotaku said that it was "the perfect capstone" and "a wonderful sendoff" to Celeste, and USgamer said that it really felt "like a farewell" to the game. Kotaku praised the chapter's mechanics, saying that they "play with expectations" by "constantly reinvent[ing]" themselves, and that the levels present in Farewell were "some of the finest and most rewarding" challenges in Celeste, and "some of the best designed levels of any game". However, USgamer said they were unable to complete the chapter due to its difficulty. Farewell's music was praised by Kotaku, who said it was "fantastic", and that the world as a whole was "charming". Critics noted Farewell's subtle signs that Madeline was trans, and how they had fueled fan investigation into previous signs of Madeline's trans identity. Critic Laura Dale opined that the ambiguous presentation of Madeline's queerness was not good representation because there were not better layers of signs throughout the narrative, making the identity easy to deny. She requested a more explicit comment from the game's creators on the subject.

=== Fan community ===
After release, Celeste developed a dedicated fanbase, including an active speedrunning community. Certain Celeste players have created custom levels for the game using mods. According to USgamer, the community was "a huge part of Celeste's success". Kotaku wrote that the game "attracted an audience that's undeniably queer" and that many queer members of the Celeste community felt "empowered" by the game because Madeline's character arc felt evocative of the struggles faced by the LGBTQ community.

Speedrunning was actively considered by the game's designers. Himself a speedrunner, sound designer Kevin Regamey contributed to the game's accommodation of speedrunning, and noted that the development team wanted to make speedrunning more accessible to casual players. Several techniques discovered by speedrunners were formally implemented into the game in updates. According to Thorson, the team wanted to allow the best players to continually discover new tricks that can be used by less skilled players. Mechanics are adjusted to accommodate players who wish to perform advanced techniques, though it is often done subtly to preserve the feeling of "breaking" the game. The development team conversed with members of the community to better accommodate speedrunning in certain updates. Members of Celeste's speedrunning community generally appreciate the developers' involvement, and have praised how changes to the game avoid removing techniques used in speedruns. Others feel that the act of speedrunning Celeste ties into the game's themes of perseverance.

After the release of the Farewell expansion in 2019, queer symbols caused a debate over Madeline's gender identity among the Celeste fandom. The epilogue shows a pride flag and transgender pride flag on Madeline's desk, and some fans argued that these signs, as well as plot points throughout the game, implied that Madeline was a trans woman. Other fans disagreed, and one critic noted that the game's ambiguous presentation of Madeline's queerness enabled this debate. Thorson wrote a year later that Madeline was definitely trans, and apologized to fans who had felt hurt by the silence of the game's creators on the subject. Thorson said that realizing Madeline's identity had taken some time, especially as Thorson was figuring out her own gender identity, and the development team had debated how to represent this in the art. The team eventually realized that without explicitly stating that Madeline was trans, some fans would always continue to deny it.

=== Accolades ===
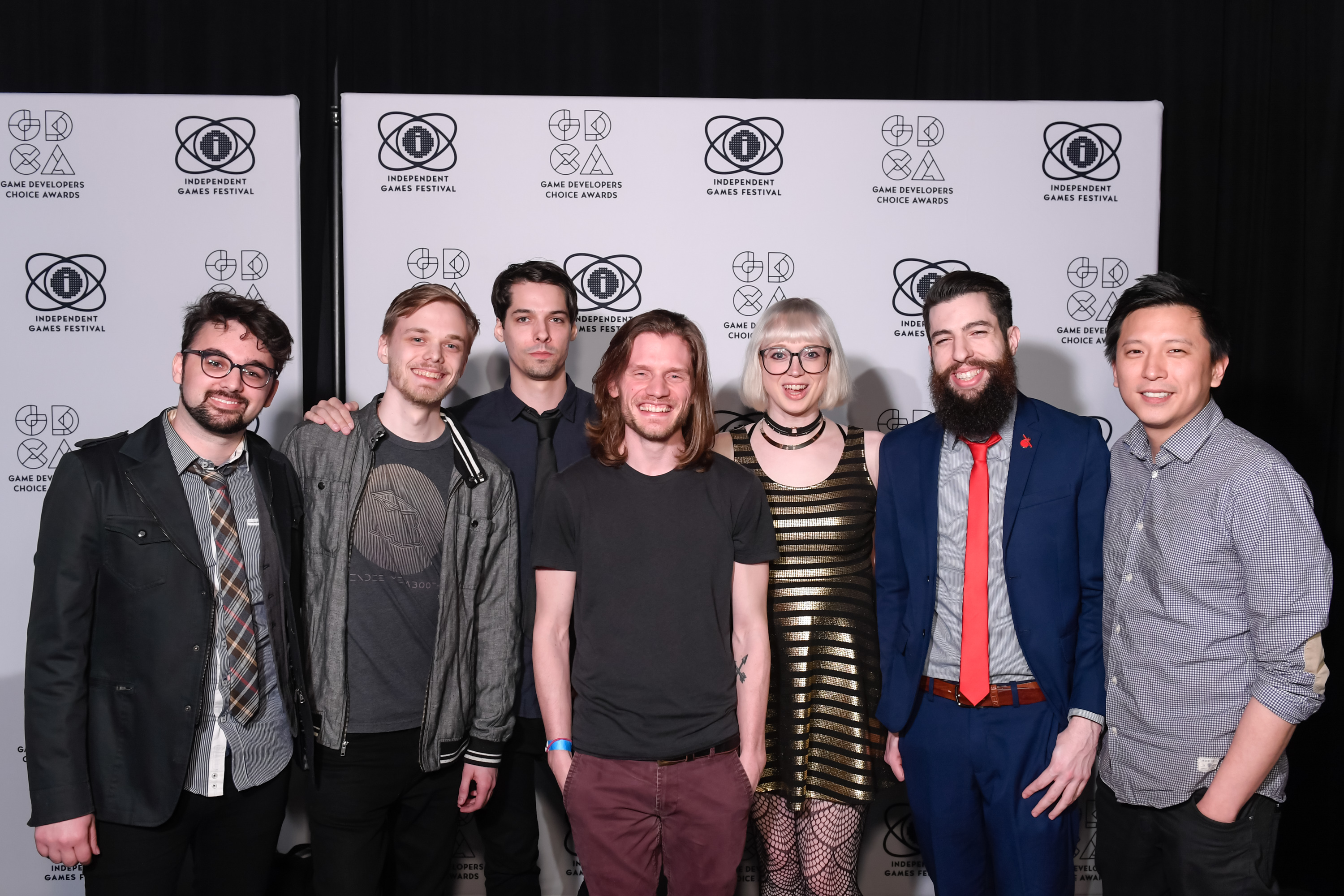
The Celeste development team at the Game Developers Choice Awards in 2018

Upon release, Celeste received several nominations and accolades, including for Game of the Year, from outlets and award shows. IGN nominated Celeste for Game of the Year in its 2018 'Best of' awards. The game was ranked by Polygon as the fifth best game of 2018, and ranked by USgamer as the second best game of 2018. Celeste was Shacknews' Best Indie Game of 2018, and Ars Technica considered it to be the best game overall in 2018.

Year	Award	Category	Result	Ref.
2018	Independent Games Festival Awards	Excellence in Audio	Nominated	
2018	Independent Games Festival Awards	Audience Award	Won	
2018	Golden Joystick Awards	Ultimate Game of the Year	Nominated	
2018	Golden Joystick Awards	Best Indie Game	Nominated	
2018	The Game Awards 2018	Game of the Year	Nominated	
2018	The Game Awards 2018	Best Score/Music	Nominated	
2018	The Game Awards 2018	Games for Impact	Won	
2018	The Game Awards 2018	Best Independent Game	Won	
2018	Gamers' Choice Awards	Fan Favorite Game	Nominated	
2018	Gamers' Choice Awards	Fan Favorite Single Player Gaming Experience	Nominated	
2018	Gamers' Choice Awards	Fan Favorite Indie Game	Nominated	
2018	Titanium Awards	Best Indie Game	Nominated	
2019	22nd Annual D.I.C.E. Awards	Action Game of the Year	Won	
2019	22nd Annual D.I.C.E. Awards	Outstanding Achievement for an Independent Game	Won	
2019	SXSW Gaming Awards	Excellence in Narrative	Nominated	
2019	SXSW Gaming Awards	Matthew Crump Cultural Innovation Award	Won	
2019	SXSW Gaming Awards	Excellence in Musical Score	Nominated	
2019	SXSW Gaming Awards	Trending Game of the Year	Nominated	
2019	SXSW Gaming Awards	Video Game of the Year	Nominated	
2019	Game Developers Choice Awards	Game of the Year	Nominated	
2019	Game Developers Choice Awards	Best Audio	Won	
2019	Game Developers Choice Awards	Best Design	Nominated	
2019	2019 Game Audio Network Guild Awards	Best Music for an Indie Game	Nominated	
2019	2019 Game Audio Network Guild Awards	G.A.N.G. / MAGFEST People's Choice Award	Won	
2019	15th British Academy Games Awards	Best Game	Nominated	
2019	15th British Academy Games Awards	Game Beyond Entertainment	Nominated	
2019	15th British Academy Games Awards	Game Design	Nominated	
2019	15th British Academy Games Awards	Game Innovation	Nominated	
2019	15th British Academy Games Awards	Music	Nominated	
2019	ASCAP Composers' Choice Awards	2018 Video Game Score of the Year	Won	
2019	8th Annual New York Game Awards	Big Apple Award for Best Game of the Year	Nominated	
2019	8th Annual New York Game Awards	Off Broadway Award for Best Indie Game	Nominated	

== Legacy ==
Before release, Berry said that a potential sequel to Celeste was not currently planned, and that the team had "told the story [they] wanted to tell". Ahead of Farewell's release, Thorson said the team "really [does not] want to make a sequel" to Celeste, adding that the team is unaware how they would be able to "do a sequel justice", and that they are "way more interested in making something new" than revisiting an old creation. In a blog post commemorating the game's fourth anniversary in 2022, Thorson said, "I do not want to make Celeste again and I do not want to be who I was when we made Celeste, again", and that she would like to move forward with future projects.

On Celeste's third anniversary on January 26, 2021, a sequel to Celeste Classic, titled Celeste 2: Lani's Trek, (Note: Also known as Celeste Classic 2: Lani's Trek or simply Celeste Classic 2) was released. The sequel stars a new character, Lani, who makes use of a grappling hook to interact with objects and climb Celeste Mountain. The game was developed in three days by Thorson, Berry, and Raine, and released for PICO-8. To celebrate Celeste's sixth anniversary in January 2024, the game's developers released Celeste 64: Fragments of the Mountain, a short three-dimensional platform game inspired by games for the Nintendo 64. It was designed to continue the narrative of Celeste.

Hardcore Gaming 101 included Celeste in a 2020 addendum to their book The 200 Best Video Games of All Time, and USA Today ranked it as the fourteenth best game of all time in 2022.
