= A Mortician's Tale =

2017 video game

- Developer: Laundry Bear Games
- Publisher: Laundry Bear Games
- Director: Gabby DaRienzo
- Designer: Gabby DaRienzo
- Programmer: Andrew Carvalho
- Artists: Gabby DaRienzo; Jacquelin de Leon
- Writer: Kaitlin Tremblay
- Composer: Halina Heron
- Engine: Unity
- Platforms: macOS, Windows, iOS
- Release: macOS, Windows; 18 October 2017; iOS; 22 November 2018
- Genre: Management
- Mode: Single-player

A Mortician's Tale is a management video game developed by Laundry Bear Games. Players take control of a mortician working in a funeral home. The game was released for Windows and macOS in October 2017.

== Gameplay ==
A Mortician's Tale is a management video game in which the player takes control of Charlie, who has just started work as a mortician at a funeral home.

== Development and Release ==
A Mortician's Tale was developed by Canadian indie game studio Laundry Bear Games. Inspiration for the game came from author and mortician Caitlin Doughty and death acceptance organization The Order of the Good Death.

The game was released for Windows and macOS on 18 October 2017. The game is currently available on Steam, itch.io, Apple's App Store, and Humble Bundle.

== Reception ==
Reception

Aggregate score
Aggregator	Score
Metacritic	PC: 78/100

Review scores
Publication	Score
Destructoid	8/10
Eurogamer	Recommended
PC Gamer (UK)	82/100

A Mortician's Tale was received positively by critics. Polygon ranked it 50th on their list of the 50 best games of 2017. The game was nominated for "Game, Special Class" at the National Academy of Video Game Trade Reviewers Awards, and for the Nuovo Award at the Independent Games Festival Competition Awards.
