= Iceberg Peak =

Mountain on Vancouver Island, British Columbia, Canada

- Location within Vancouver Island Location within British Columbia
- Interactive map of Iceberg Peak

Highest point
- Elevation: 1,982 m (6,503 ft)
- Prominence: 72 m (236 ft)
- Parent peak: Mount Celeste (2045 m)
- Listing: Mountains of British Columbia
- Coordinates: 49°34′19″N 125°23′29″W

Geography
- Country: Canada
- Province: British Columbia
- District: Clayoquot Land District
- Protected area: Strathcona Provincial Park
- Parent range: Vancouver Island Ranges
- Topo map: NTS 92F11 Forbidden Plateau

Climbing
- First ascent: 1930's

Iceberg Peak is a mountain located on Vancouver Island, British Columbia, Canada. Within the boundaries of Strathcona Provincial Park, this peak lies at the south end of Rees Ridge. Mount Celeste lies at the north end of this ridge.

== History ==
The first ascent of this peak is credited to the Bill Bell survey party in the 1930s.
