= TowerFall =

2013 action video game

- Developer: Maddy Makes Games
- Publisher: Maddy Makes Games
- Director: Maddy Thorson
- Designer: Maddy Thorson
- Programmer: Maddy Thorson
- Artists: Pedro Medeiros; Amora Bettany
- Composer: Alec Holowka
- Engine: Microsoft XNA
- Platforms: PlayStation 4, Windows, Linux, OS X, PlayStation Vita, Xbox One, Nintendo Switch, Ouya
- Release: June 25, 2013: Android; June 25, 2013; PlayStation 4, Windows; March 11, 2014; Linux, OS X; May 29, 2014; PlayStation Vita; December 15, 2015; Xbox One; January 25, 2017; Nintendo Switch; September 27, 2018
- Genre: Action
- Modes: Single-player, multiplayer

TowerFall is an action indie video game created by Maddy Thorson through her company Maddy Makes Games, which would later become Canadian developer and publisher Extremely OK Games. In the game, players control up to four archers in a multiplayer platform fighter. It was released on the Ouya microconsole in June 2013 and was later ported to PlayStation 4, Xbox One, Linux, OS X, and Windows as TowerFall Ascension and to the Nintendo Switch under its original title of TowerFall.

TowerFall was Thorson's first commercial game. It followed from a June 2012 game jam single-player prototype. Thorson tested the game on her indie developer colleagues with whom she lived, and developed its capacity as a party game. Its mechanics were inspired by games of Thorson's youth, such as Bushido Blade and GoldenEye 007, and influenced by demo feedback at the Evolution Championship Series fighting game tournament. TowerFall was known as the standout title for the Ouya at the console's launch. In its first year, the game sold around 7,000 copies on Ouya, resulting in a gross revenue of about $105,000. When the Ouya exclusivity expired, Thorson signed another exclusivity agreement for the PlayStation 4, where Ascension received an expanded single-player mode, and new levels, weapons, and gameplay variants. A PlayStation Vita release followed in 2015, and Xbox One and Switch versions have been released as well. A standalone eight-player edition for Windows released in 2016.

Ascension was met with generally favorable reception. Critics recommended it as a party game reminiscent of Super Smash Bros. and praised its balance. However, some felt that its single-player mode was a low point, and lamented the lack of an online multiplayer mode.

== Gameplay ==
Typical combat between three players

TowerFall is an archery combat arena game where players kill each other with arrows and head-stomps until only one player remains. It is also possible to play in cooperative mode. In multiplayer, up to four players fight in an arena using a limited supply of arrows. Players replenish their arrow supply from those shot about the arena. The players can also catch other players' arrows. "Treasure" power-ups give players shields, wings, and arrows with increased power. The game's rules can be customized and saved for future use. Kotaku's Chris Person described the gameplay as "[Super] Smash Bros. bred with games like Spelunky or Nidhogg".

There are four game modes. In single-player, the player must hit targets around the arena before a timer runs out. The developer compared this mode to "Break the Targets" in the Super Smash Bros. series. Ascension adds a remodeled version of the target levels as a Trials mode, which requires the players to use power-ups to break all targets within several seconds. Ascension also adds a Quest mode, where one or two players attempt to survive against enemy waves of increasing difficulty. As a single-player event, Quest functions as a score attack mode. The new Ascension improvements were also released for the Ouya version.

The Ouya release supports the Xbox 360 and PlayStation 3 controllers. Ascension uses the DualShock 4 controller's built-in speaker to play sound effects. The game does not have online multiplayer.

== Development ==
The game was developed and produced by Maddy Thorson, who previously made Planet Punch and browser games. TowerFall was her first full commercial game. The idea came from a visit with Alec Holowka as they worked at a game jam, the 48-hour June 2012 Vancouver Full Indie Game Jam. The team iterated through a Legend of Zelda-inspired multiplayer mode that became a single-player platformer Flash game where the player was a "skilled archer out of an ancient legend". She intended to add multiple weapons, but chose to keep the first one—the bow and arrow—due to its feel. The arrow was designed to fire without charging and to bias towards targets so as to give the player "more leeway". Thorson also chose to limit the aim direction to the eight ordinal directions rather than affording complex 360 degree controls. She also added levels, items, a store, and a story based on ascending a tower. Along with in-game progress, players would gain new items and skills. Thorson originally intended to send the game to Adult Swim for "easy money", but changed her mind upon developing a multiplayer version after the jam.

Holowka credits the multiplayer's party game feel to the many hours of local multiplayer testing it received in Thorson's homes in Vancouver. Thorson lived with a developer she met through Game Maker's community, and the two eventually moved in with Holowka in "Indie House", a Vancouver house whose occupants are all indie developers. (Note: At one point, four of the seven Indie House residents were working on TowerFall.) The close community of indie gamers and their interest in trying new game ideas was both a product and generator of their living arrangements. Though Holowka dropped back from the project shortly after the game jam, leaving the project to Thorson, he stepped in to demo the game at the 2013 Game Developers Conference at the last minute when Thorson's passport had expired. With an increase in press attention following an exhibition at PAX East, Thorson entered an agreement with Ouya's Kellee Santiago to release exclusively on the microconsole. Critics saw this as being the action the new console needed to compete with existing consoles, and Thorson felt the release for Ouya to be less "intimidating" than releasing for the PlayStation 3. The game also fit Ouya's emphasis on couch co-op gaming. Thorson originally did the artwork herself but was not satisfied with the results and hired MiniBoss to finish the graphics. Holowka composed the music, and Thorson hired Power Up Audio to make the sound effects.

Thorson said that the game started to come together about six months into its development. They tested the game on close friends once every few weeks, and the friends would ask Thorson when they could play it again. Thorson brought the game to the 2013 Evolution Championship Series fighting games tournament, where they unexpectedly received more praise than criticism. The game mechanics were inspired by games from Thorson's youth. Upon reflection, they felt that the game had the item-catching mechanics of Super Smash Bros., the one-hit kills and tension of Bushido Blade, the playfulness of Goldeneye 007, the shooting mechanics of Yoshi's Island, and the positioning strategy of Team Fortress 2. They described their development process as tweaking Super Smash Bros. Melee to their tastes. The limited arrow design was intended to slow the gameplay and encourage player strategy. She considered adding online multiplayer, a popular request, but lacked the programming skills herself. The game's medieval scenery came from their contemporary interest in the Game of Thrones book series and their pairing of the arrow mechanic with "stone-walled castles and lava-filled dungeons". The player-characters also have individual personalities and backstories that Thorson intended to elaborate in a "lore" section of an instruction manual.

== Release ==
TowerFall was released June 25, 2013 as an Ouya exclusive. The game sold well, minding the Ouya's newness, which allowed Thorson to develop the game into a fuller package. Thorson stated her plans to extend the single-player, and signed a new exclusivity agreement to release TowerFall Ascension on PlayStation 4 and Steam with new levels, weapons, and gameplay variants after the Ouya exclusivity agreement ended six months later. (Note: Thorson was also pursued by Nintendo and Microsoft.) Sony actively pursued the game, and a majority of the porting work was handled by Dallas-based Sickhead Games by two people over the course of eight weeks using MonoGame, "an open-source rewrite" of Microsoft XNA. Thorson thought that the DualShock 4's directional pad was "perfect for TowerFall" and that the PlayStation 4 was "the natural next step" for the game. They received a letter from George Broussard before Ascension's launch with pre-congratulations on Thorson's becoming a millionaire. The main additions to Ascension were its single-player and cooperative gameplay modes. A level editor is planned for a future update, and Thorson has expressed interest in six controller support for three-on-three matches. Ports for Linux and OS X platforms were released on May 29, 2014, with updated game variants. TowerFall was selected for the July 2014 Evolution Championship Series fighting game tournament's Indie Showcase, and as a free game with PlayStation Plus for the same month.

Towerfall: Ascension was eventually released as a sequel to the original Towerfall for the OUYA console in November 2016.

=== Updates ===
In February 2015 an alternate skin for the "Blue Archer" character was revealed for the expansion "Dark World", developers stated her appearance was based on that of Anita Sarkeesian. An expansion pack, Dark World, was released in North America on May 12, 2015, for the PlayStation 4 and PC (Linux, OS X, and Windows) via Steam, the Humble Store, and GOG.com. The European PlayStation release followed several days later. The pack includes a four-player multiplayer campaign mode where players fight boss battles together and can resuscitate each other. It also adds a power-up that makes arrows explode by remote-detonation. The pack began as a set of new levels and became four sets, ten new characters, procedurally generated levels, and the aforementioned power-up, co-op, and boss battles. A PlayStation Vita version was released on December 15, 2015. An Xbox One version, including both Ascension and Dark World, was released on January 18, 2018. A Nintendo Switch version was released on September 27, 2018, and includes Madeline and her dark reflection Badeline from the game Celeste, which was also made by Maddy Makes Games. Thorson also created an additional, standalone Windows game that modifies the versus mode for five to eight simultaneous players. TowerFall 8-Player was released in August 2016.

=== Physical Editions ===
In September 2015, Maddy Makes Games partnered with the subscription box company IndieBox, a monthly subscription box service, to offer an exclusive, individually-numbered physical release of TowerFall. This limited edition box included a flash-drive with a DRM-free game file, official soundtrack, instruction manual, Steam key, and various custom-designed collectibles. In November 2020, a limited physical release of the Nintendo Switch version was announced through Limited Run Games.

== Reception ==
Multiple reviewers cited TowerFall as the standout game for the Ouya microconsole at the time of its launch. The Penny Arcade Report's Ben Kuchera called the game "the Ouya's killer app", Polygon's Russ Frushtick and Chris Plante said that TowerFall was the reason to purchase an Ouya. Destructoid's Spencer Hayes said that he did not consider purchasing the Ouya until he played TowerFall. He added that the game had a "deceptive level of depth". Eurogamer described its reputation as "the only thing worth playing on Ouya". The added cost of additional controllers (for four-player local multiplayer) exceeded the cost of the new console itself, and was cited as a negative for the game, though later offset by its support for Xbox 360 and PS3 controllers. Plante later described the original release as "critically beloved, humbly sold", "punching way above its weight class" with recognition on the yearend lists of Ars Technica and Polygon.

Reception

Aggregate score
Aggregator	Score
Metacritic	PC: 87/100; PS4: 87/100; XONE: 80/100; NS: 89/100

Review scores
Publication	Score
Edge	8/10
Eurogamer	9/10
GameTrailers	9.1/10
IGN	8.9/10
Polygon	9.5/10

By April 2014, Thorson told Eurogamer that the game had grossed a half of a million dollars, with the most sales from Ascension on the PlayStation 4. At the time, a fifth of the games sales came from Ouya, a comparatively smaller platform with a smaller install base than PlayStation and Steam. (Note: The game had sold about 5,000 copies by November 2013, and about 7,000 Ouya copies by April 2014.) The game was a nominee for the 2014 Independent Games Festival's Excellence in Design award, but lost to Papers, Please. TowerFall Ascension received "generally favorable" reviews, according to game review aggregator Metacritic. At the 2013 National Academy of Video Game Trade Reviewers (NAVGTR) awards the game won Game, Original Fighting. Reviewers praised the game's balance, compared it favorably with Super Smash Bros., and recommended it as a party game. Critics felt that the single-player mode was a nadir, and lamented that there was no online multiplayer mode, with Jon Denton of Eurogamer calling the lack "painful" and "a crying shame".

Griffin McElroy of Polygon found the game joyful and called it "a powerful distillery of childlike glee". IGN's Jose Otero thought highly of its visuals. He considered the single-player mode a low point of the game, that it was only useful as practice. Eurogamer's Denton called it "an afterthought", and that Trials was "a tertiary mode at best". Edge wrote that the boundaries of the game's play area were confusing, and that it was difficult to watch both the area around the player-character as well as the boundaries, which worked against what they deemed to be TowerFall's "greatest strength": close range combat. Denton praised the arrow catching mechanic, which he compared to the "hooks" of other "great multiplayer games", like the Ultra counter in Street Fighter IV. He further compared the multiplayer to the battle modes of Bomberman, Mario, and Super Smash Bros., the Trials mode to 10 Second Ninja, and the game's "immediacy" to Nidhogg and Samurai Gunn.

Polygon named the game among the decade's top 25 games.

=== Sales ===
In July 2013, TowerFall sold approximately 2,000 copies on Ouya, generating about $21,000 in revenue after the platform’s revenue share. In March 2014, the game ranked as the 6th most downloaded title on PlayStation 4 for the month. By April 2014, sales on Ouya had reached around 7,000 copies. Across all platforms, TowerFall had grossed over $500,000 by that time.

== See also ==
- List of Ouya software
