= Player character =

Character controlled by a game player

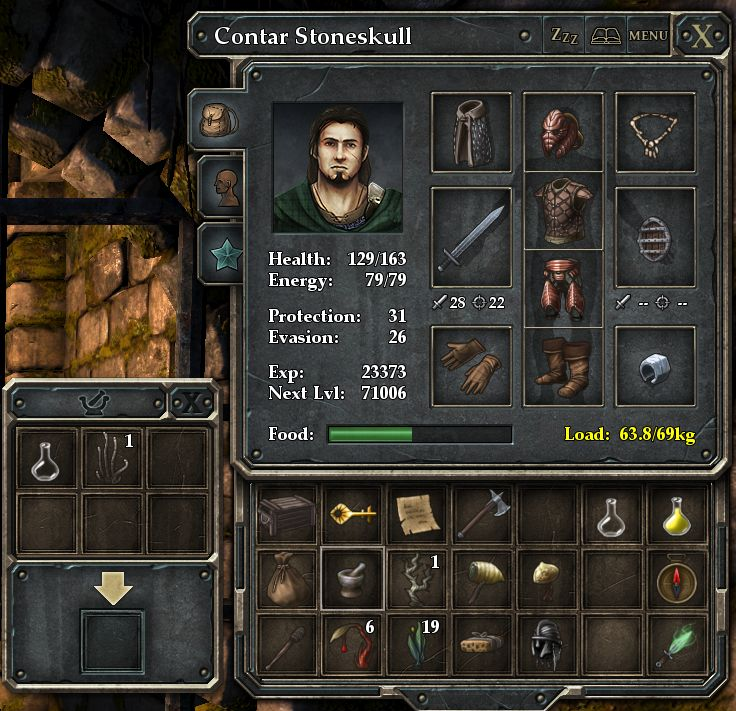
A player character named "Contar Stoneskull" in Legend of Grimrock. The squares contain icons representing items he is wearing and items he is carrying on his adventure. Statistics such as his health and experience are also listed.

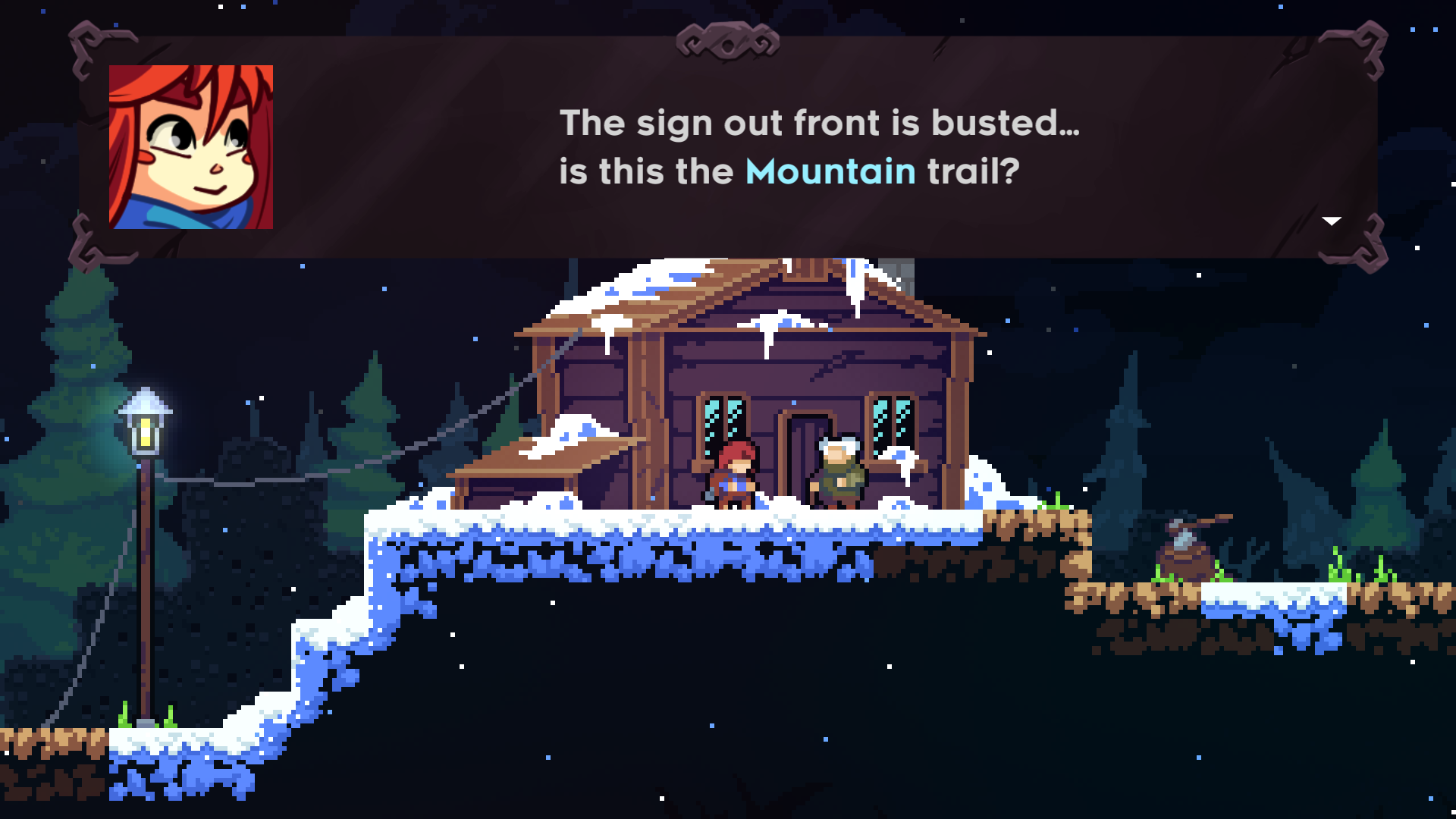
The player-controlled character of Madeline (left) talks to a non-player character outside a building in the game Celeste.

A player character (PC), also known as a playable character, is a fictional character in a video game or tabletop role-playing game whose actions are controlled by a player rather than the rules of the game. The characters that are not controlled by a player are called non-player characters (NPCs). The actions of non-player characters are typically handled by the game itself in video games, or according to rules followed by a gamemaster (GM) refereeing tabletop role-playing games. The player character functions as a fictional, alternate body for the player controlling the character.

Video games typically have one player character for each person playing the game. Some games, such as multiplayer online battle arena, hero shooter, and fighting games, offer a group of player characters for the player to choose from, allowing the player to control one of them at a time. Where more than one player character is available, the characters may have distinctive abilities and differing styles of play.

== Overview ==
=== Avatars ===
A player character may sometimes be based on a real person, especially in sports games that use the names and likenesses of real athletes. Historical figures and leaders may sometimes appear as characters too, particularly in strategy or empire building games such as in Sid Meier's Civilization series. Such a player character is more properly an avatar as the player character's name and image typically have little bearing on the game itself. Avatars are also commonly seen in casino game simulations.

=== Blank characters ===
In many video games, and especially first-person shooters, the player character is a "blank slate" without any notable characteristics or even backstory. Pac-Man, Crono from Chrono Trigger, Link from The Legend of Zelda, Chell from Portal, and Claude from Grand Theft Auto III are examples of such characters. These characters are generally silent protagonists.

Some games will go even further, never showing or naming the player character at all. This is somewhat common in first-person videogames, such as in Myst, but is more often done in strategy video games such as Dune 2000, Emperor: Battle for Dune, and Command & Conquer series. In such games, the only real indication that the player has a character (instead of an omnipresent status), is from the cutscenes during which the character is being given a mission briefing or debriefing; the player is usually addressed as "general", "commander", or another military rank.

In gaming culture, such a character was called Ageless, Faceless, Gender-Neutral, Culturally Ambiguous Adventure Person, abbreviated as AFGNCAAP; a term that originated in Zork: Grand Inquisitor where it is used satirically to refer to the player.

=== Character action games ===
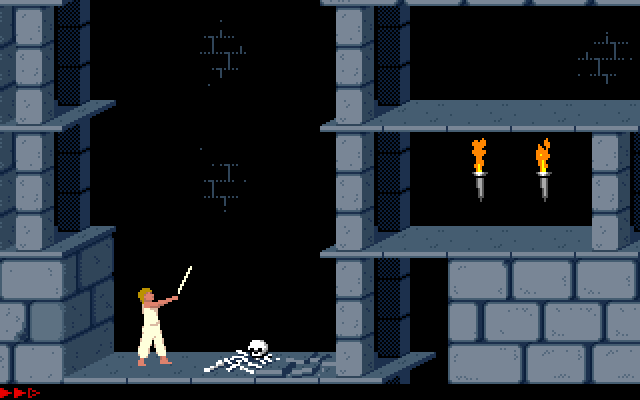
1989 platformer game Prince of Persia

Character action games (also called character-driven games, character games or just action games) are a broad category of action games, referring to a variety of games that are driven by the physical actions of player characters. The term dates back to the golden age of arcade video games in the early 1980s, when the terms "action games" and "character games" began being used to distinguish a new emerging genre of character-driven action games from the space shoot 'em ups that had previously dominated the arcades in the late 1970s. Classic examples of character action games from that period include maze games like Pac-Man, platformers like Donkey Kong, and Frogger.

Side-scrolling character action games (also called "side-scrolling action games" or "side-scrollers") are a broad category of character action games that were popular from the mid-1980s to the 1990s, which involve player characters defeating large groups of weaker enemies along a side-scrolling playfield. Examples include beat 'em ups like Kung-Fu Master and Double Dragon, ninja action games like The Legend of Kage and Shinobi, scrolling platformers like Super Mario Bros. and Sonic the Hedgehog, and run and gun shooters like Rolling Thunder and Gunstar Heroes.

"Character action games" is also a term used for 3D hack and slash games modelled after Devil May Cry, which represent an evolution of arcade character action games. Other examples of this sub-genre include Ninja Gaiden, God of War, and Bayonetta.

=== Fighting games ===
Fighting games typically have a larger number of player characters to choose from, with some basic moves available to all or most characters and some unique moves only available to one or a few characters. Having many distinctive characters to play as and against, all possessing different moves and abilities, is necessary to create a larger gameplay variety in such games.

=== Hero shooters ===
Similarly to MOBAs, hero shooters emphasize pre-designed "hero" characters with distinctive abilities and weapons that are not available to the other characters. Hero shooters strongly encourage teamwork between players on a team, guiding players to select effective combinations of hero characters and coordinate the use of hero abilities during a match.

=== Multiplayer online battle arena ===
Multiplayer online battle arena games offer a large group of viable player characters for the player to choose from, each of which having distinctive abilities, strengths, and weaknesses to make the game play style different. Characters can learn new abilities or augment existing ones over the course of a match by collecting experience points. Choosing a character who complements the player's teammates and counters their opponents opens up a strategy before the beginning of the match itself. Playable characters blend a variety of fantasy tropes, featuring numerous references to popular culture and mythology.

=== Role-playing games ===
In both tabletop role playing games such as Dungeons & Dragons and role-playing video games such as Final Fantasy, a player typically creates or takes on the identity of a character that may have nothing in common with the player. The character is often of a certain (usually fictional) race and class (such as zombie, berserker, rifleman, elf, or cleric), each with strengths and weaknesses. The attributes of the characters (such as magic and fighting ability) are given as numerical values which can be increased as the character progresses and gains rank and experience points through accomplishing goals or fighting enemies.

=== Sports games ===
In many sports games, player characters are often modelled after real-life athletes, as opposed to fictional characters. This is particularly the case for sports simulation games, whereas many arcade-style sports games often have fictional characters instead.

== Secret characters ==
A secret or unlockable character is a playable character in a video game available only after either completing the game or meeting another requirement. In some video games, characters that are not secret but appear only as non-player characters like bosses or enemies become playable characters after completing certain requirements, or sometimes cheating.

== See also ==
- Avatar (computing)
- Non-player character
