= Gabby DaRienzo =

Video game developer

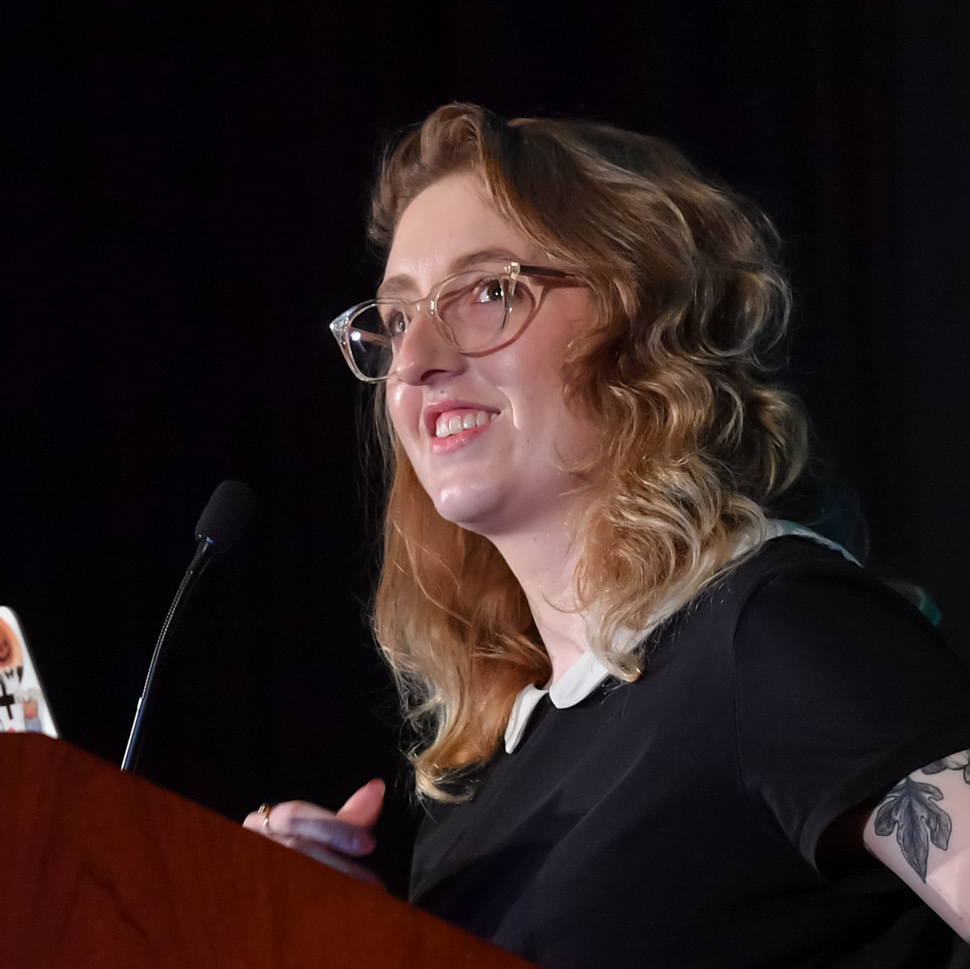
- DaRienzo in 2018
- Education: George Brown College
- Occupation: Video game developer
- Notable work: A Mortician's Tale, Celeste
- Website: https://gabbydarienzo.com/

Gabby DaRienzo is a video game developer whose works include:

- A Mortician's Tale, 2017
- Celeste (artist), 2018
- Parkitect (artist), 2018
- Seasonala Cemetery, 2025

== Personal life ==
DaRienzo identifies as Queer.

== Awards and accomplishments ==
DaRienzo's game A Mortician's Tale was nominated for the Nuovo Award and an Honorable Mention for the "Excellence in Narrative" Award at the 2018 Independent Games Festival Awards.

DaRienzo was named by Forbes as one of their "30 Under 30" for gaming in 2019, recognizing her for the development of A Mortician's Tale.
