= Rees Ridge =

Mountain in British Columbia, Canada

- Location within British Columbia

Highest point
- Coordinates: 49°34′48″N 125°24′37″W

Geography
- Location: British Columbia

Rees Ridge is a ridge located on Comox Land District, British Columbia, Canada. The highest point on Rees Ridge is Mount Celeste, which reaches an altitude of 2,045 meters.

== Name ==
It was named in 1948, in honor of Harry Rees.

== See also ==
- Mountains of British Columbia
- Mount Celeste
