= Celeste 64: Fragments of the Mountain =

2024 video game

- Logo
- Developer: Extremely OK Games
- Publisher: Extremely OK Games
- Platforms: Linux; macOS; Microsoft Windows
- Release: Linux, Windows; January 29, 2024; macOS; February 5, 2024
- Genres: Adventure, platformer
- Mode: Single-player

Celeste 64: Fragments of the Mountain is a 2024 3D platformer video game developed and published by Canadian indie studio Extremely OK Games for Linux, macOS and Microsoft Windows. The game was developed during a week-long game jam, in which it released in celebration of the sixth anniversary of the 2018 video game Celeste. The game released January 29, 2024, acting as semi-sequel to that game and a continuation to its narrative.

The player controls Madeline, the protagonist from the first game, who has returned to Celeste Mountain in order to reunite with Badeline and contemplate overcoming a big step in her life. Many people who worked on Celeste returned for this game, including composer Lena Raine who released a new soundtrack for it. The choice to transform the Celeste formula into 3D gameplay came from investigating a Quake level editor. Fragments of the Mountain received positive reception, with critics praising the game for its difficulty and soundtrack, whilst criticizing the game for its clunky keyboard controls.

== Gameplay ==
Madeline performing a mid-air dash before climbing up the side of a building

Celeste 64 is a short three-dimensional (3D) platform-adventure video game set upon a fictionalized Mount Celeste. The player controls Madeline, the protagonist of the first game; she can run, jump, wall jump and climb walls, which allows the player to avoid hazards such as pitfalls and spikes. Additionally, she can utilize the ability to dash both on the ground and in mid-air, though only one dash can be performed before needing to recharge by touching the ground. By dashing on the ground and then performing a jump, Madeline is able to perform a dash jump, which is used to reach farther distances.

Gems can be found around the level that can enhance the dash ability in mid-air; green gems can refill the dash without needing to touch the ground, while purple gems can give Madeline a second consecutive dash in mid-air. A feather power-up can grant the ability to float for a short amount of time, in order to cross large gaps. The game incorporates a timer, which incentivizes the player to speedrun the game on repeat playthroughs.

Fragments of the Mountain features a low-polygonal art style, reminiscent of the 64-bit era of video games such as Super Mario 64. Unlike the linear levels of Celeste, Fragments of the Mountain is set solely with an abandoned city which acts as an open world environment, allowing players to move the camera 360 degrees. Checkpoint flags are scattered around the environment which can respawn the player upon death. The game contains thirty strawberries for the player to collect, which are located across the environment, and in secret levels accessible via hidden cassette tapes; these secret levels act as platforming-based challenges that help the player adjust to the controls.

== Plot ==
The game's protagonist, Madeline, makes a return to Celeste Mountain sometime after the events of the first game. Upon arriving in the abandoned Forsaken City, she is greeted by Granny; she remarks about the book Madeline is writing, and questions her motivations for returning. Initially Madeline states she just wants to reminisce, but later reveals to Granny she is planning on making a "big step" in her life, which Granny reassures her about and recommends Madeline go speak with her "other Part of You" (Badeline).

Madeline later encounters her friend, Theo, atop a tall building; he mentions that he is back on the mountain to do photography for an art gallery. He reveals that he set Madeline up with his sister, Alex, and the two are currently dating. Through further questioning, Theo discovers that Alex is mentioned in the book Madeline is currently writing.

Atop a floating island, Madeline reunites with Badeline, the physical representation of her own anxiety. Badeline questions why Madeline puts them both through so much hardship and change instead of just remaining happy as is. Madeline responds by stating she does not have to justify the things she does, adding that "at the end of the day, it feels right". She further asks Badeline to come back with her, affirming with her that she is allowed to be afraid, to which Badeline accepts.

== Development and release ==
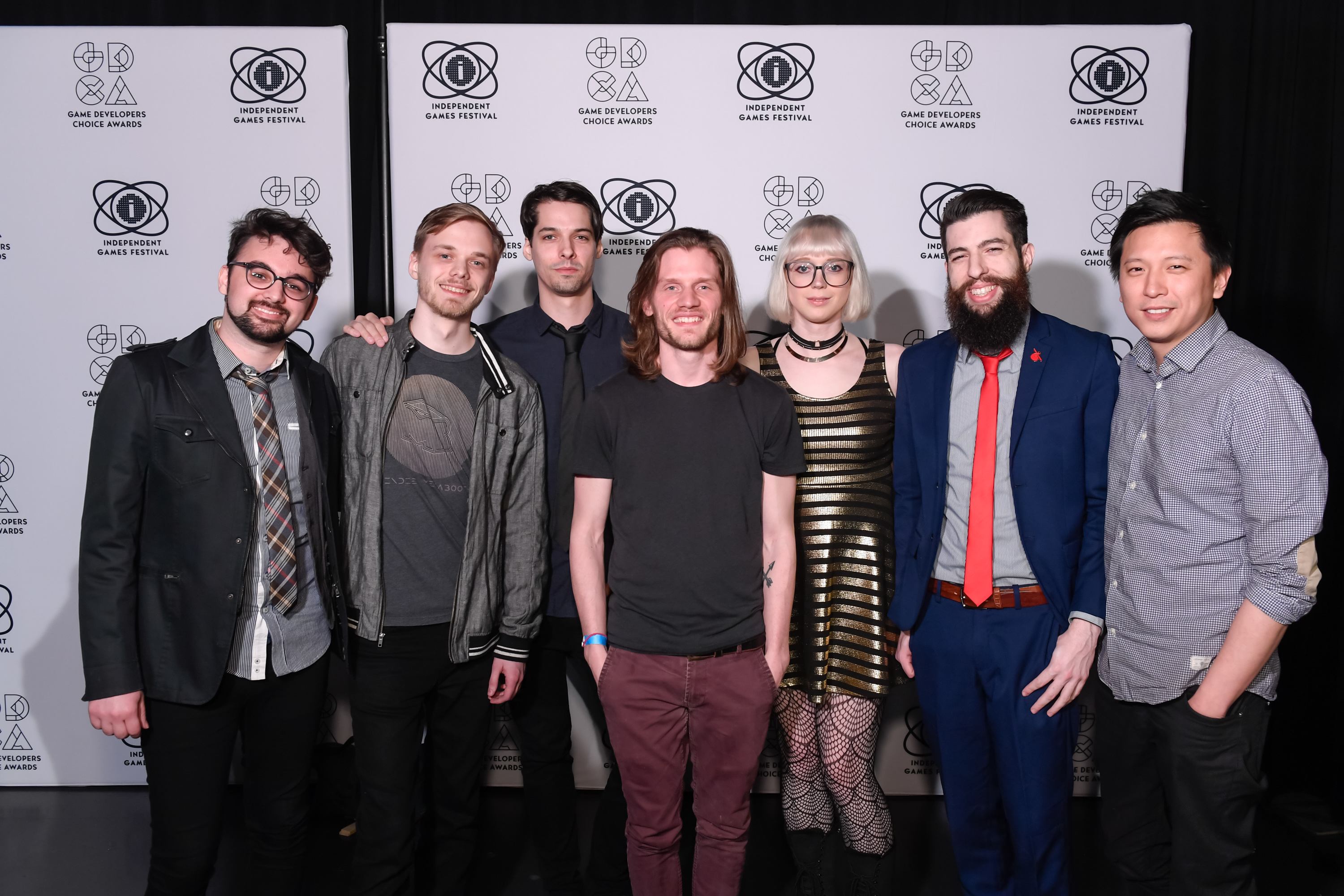
The Celeste team at GDC 2018

Celeste 64 was developed by Canadian development studio Extremely OK Games, consisting primarily of Madeline Thorson (who formerly operated Maddy Makes Games prior to its absorption), Heidy Motta, Noel Berry, Amora Bettany, and Pedro Medeiros de Almeida (saint11), developers of the original Celeste. (Note: Additional team members include Kevin Regamey and Jeff Tangsoc of composition company Power Up Audio.) The game was conceived to celebrate the original game's sixth anniversary, being developed during a week-long game jam; previously Maddy Makes Games released the PICO-8 game Celeste Classic 2 for its third anniversary. Celeste 64 was not the initial name for the project; Berry stated that he and the team initially viewed it as a "meme", but by the end the developers had "worked way too hard on it" for it to be considered one.

In an interview with Game Developer, Celeste 64's art director Pedro Medeiros de Almeida spoke about how he was looking into the Quake engine level editor TrenchBroom when brainstorming ideas on what direction to take the anniversary project in; once presenting it to the Celeste team, they decided to use it in combination with an engine designed by Berry. One challenge that arose during development was depth perception, which caused difficulty in presenting Madeline's location in a 3D space. To counteract the issue, the team experimented with a variety of shaders, fog and outlines until they were satisfied with an outcome.

During the development, the tight deadline of the game jam and the limitations of TrenchBroom forced Medeiros to choose a lower polygon count and pixel density; he stated that the art style was not designed to "strictly emulat[e] the N64", but instead follow a more generic retro aesthetic. The choice of pixel art for the game's textures was intended to be "easy to tile" on the low poly geometry, in addition to having "a nice nostalgia". The game's official soundtrack was composed by returning composer Lena Raine, who stated "every time I write more Celeste music I'm like 'surely this is the last right'"; she described the soundtrack as being inspired by both Super Mario 64 and Super Mario Sunshine, as well as using reinterpretations of the motifs featured in the original Celeste.

The game was released on January 29, 2024, for free on the Maddy Makes Games Itch.io page, with versions available for Linux and Microsoft Windows. It was released with both controller and keyboard support; though the developers recommended players use the former due to the control scheme. Concurrently, the game's source code was made freely available on GitHub. Following its release, the developers released a macOS version of the game on February 5.

== Reception ==
Celeste 64 received positive reception from critics, who compared it to Super Mario 64, Banjo-Kazooie and Spyro the Dragon. Andrew King from TheGamer proclaimed Celeste 64 as a Game of the Year contender. King went on to praise the game for "[translating] the flawless platforming of Celeste" into becoming tougher by shifting the point of view from 2D to 3D. Harvey Randall from PC Gamer described Fragments of the Mountain as being a "solid proof of concept", noting that the controls translated well from Celeste to a 3D collectathon. Writing for Kotaku, John Walker praised the game for adapting the original Celeste gameplay and characters into 3D, calling it "an undiscovered secret version of Celeste from 1997".

Some publications highlighted the game's difficulty. According to GamesRadar+'s Ali Jones, Fragments of the Mountain's three-dimensional design increased the difficulty compared to the original Celeste, by allowing the game to have side goals involving more hazardous locations, which he claimed "[made] for a much more nerve-wracking experience". He additionally compared the game's camera controls to the "slippery" dynamics of early 3D games, stating they could take a while to adjust to. Andrew King of TheGamer praised the game's challenging cassette tape levels, describing them as "gloriously difficult" and a tribute to the secret levels from Super Mario Sunshine. Echoing the developer's advice, other outlets encouraged players to play Fragments of the Mountain with a controller instead of a keyboard, with writers describing the keyboard controls as being "clunky" and "fiddly" when trying to perform precise movements.

The soundtrack for the game received positive reception. Writers from Polygon, Gigazine and Rock Paper Shotgun positively compared the game's main theme to the music track Dire Dire Docks from Super Mario 64, with the latter describing the choice of instruments used in the soundtrack to be "on-point".
