= Mount Celeste =

Mountain in British Columbia, Canada

- Location within Vancouver Island Location within British Columbia

Highest point
- Elevation: 2,045 m (6,709 ft)
- Prominence: 589 m (1,932 ft)
- Parent peak: Mount Albert Edward (2093 m)
- Listing: Mountains of British Columbia
- Coordinates: 49°34′48″N 125°24′37″W

Geography
- Location: Vancouver Island, British Columbia, Canada
- Parent range: Rees Ridge
- Topo map: NTS 92F11 Forbidden Plateau

Climbing
- First ascent: 1934

Mount Celeste is the unofficial name for a mountain located on Vancouver Island, British Columbia. It shares the name Celeste with two peaks in the Cariboo region of the BC Interior. Within the boundaries of Strathcona Provincial Park, this peak lies at the north end of Rees Ridge. Iceberg Peak lies at the south end of this ridge.

== History ==
The first documented ascent of this peak is credited to Jack Horbury and John “Jock” Sutherland on August 18, 1934. The group left two letters at the summit of Mount Celeste confirming the date of their ascent, the weather conditions, and the path they took.

== In popular culture ==
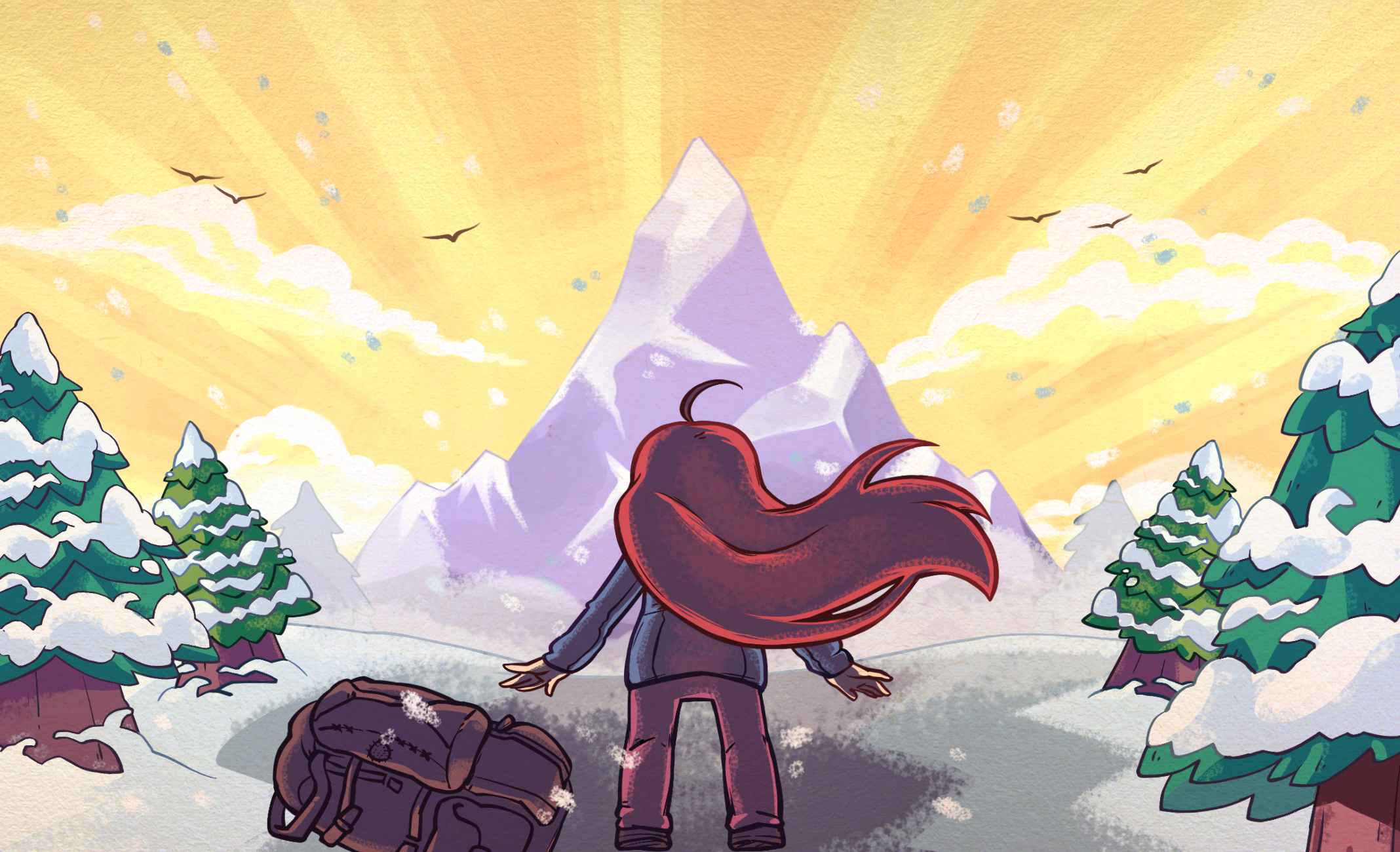
Mount Celeste as depicted in Celeste

Mount Celeste served as inspiration for the 2018 platform game Celeste. The game is about the personal struggles that the main character Madeline faces as she attempts to climb a fictional version of the mountain. The mountain is also shown on the Instagram page of in-game character Theo.

== Sources ==
- Philip Stone (2003). Island Alpine, A Guide to the Mountains of Strathcona Park and Vancouver Island. Wild Isle Publications: Heriot Bay, BC. ISBN 0-9680766-5-3.
