= Earthblade =

Canceled video game

- Developer: Extremely OK Games
- Publisher: Extremely OK Games
- Platform: Windows
- Release: Canceled
- Genres: Action, platform
- Mode: Single-player

Earthblade was a Metroidvania platform video game in development by Extremely OK Games. It was intended to be an exploration-action and platformer video game, featuring an art style similar to the studio's previous game, Celeste. Its development began in 2019 and was first publicly announced in 2021. The game's footage was showcased at The Game Awards 2022, which was positively received by reviewers.

The game was initially set to be released in 2023, though the game was re-scheduled for 2024 instead at The Game Awards 2022. In January 2025, the studio announced that the game had been canceled, citing the dispute over intellectual property rights of Celeste and struggles with development as some of the reasons.

== Gameplay ==
Earthblade was developed as a two-dimensional exploration-action platformer featuring pixel art-styled graphics. Its genre and art style were similar to the developer's previous game, Celeste (2018). The open world game also subscribed to the adventure, especially the Metroidvania subgenre, and fantasy genres. The player was supposed to control the character Névoa, who had recently returned to a ruined Earth, as they explore the world, dash between platforms, climb terrain, and fight enemies.

== Development ==
Earthblade was in development by the indie studio Extremely OK Games. The game was present on Steam and was set to be released for Windows platforms. The development began in 2019, though it was first publicly announced in April 2021, when the studio also released fragments of its soundtrack composed by Lena Raine. The game's logo was designed by Pedro Medeiros. "When we started working again, we had this urge to run as far away from Celeste as possible", developer Maddy Thorson said. The studio later agreed to include elements of Celeste.

Upon the game's first announcement, the studio first announced the game to be potentially released in 2023, though Thorson said that the game's development "could take longer". Playtesting of the game began in April 2022. Thorson said that the studio would playtest the game each month and hoped to release the game in 2023. Thorson later showcased the first footage of Earthblade at The Game Awards 2022, where it was announced that the game would be released in 2024 instead. The studio announced in March 2024 that the game would be released after 2024, with Thorson adding that the development of the game had not become dormant. In the same announcement, the studio announced that indie developer Kyle Pulver, who previously worked on Super Meat Boy Forever and Offspring Fling, joined the game's development team as a designer.

The studio announced in January 2025 that the game had been canceled, citing the dispute over intellectual property rights of Celeste that led to the loss of a studio member, and the struggle to continue development as reasons. The studio also announced that they would go back to working on "smaller-scale projects".

On March 7, 2025, Earthblade's music composer, Lena Raine, released an album featuring nine songs from the game, titled EARTHBLADE ~ Across the Bounds of Fate, on her Bandcamp page. On the album's page, she describes it as more of a "concept album" than a soundtrack, stating that she "decided to cobble together every bit of music [she'd] written for the game to the point of its cancellation in order to tell [her] own version of it".

== Reception ==
Chris Moyse of Destructoid praised the game's music and looks, as seen in the game's footage at The Game Awards 2022. Shubhankar Parijat of GamingBolt also praised the game's looks in the trailer.
