= Maddy Thorson =

Canadian video game developer (born 1988)

- Thorson in 2025
- Born: 18 March 1988 (age 38)
- Citizenship: Canadian
- Occupation: Video game developer
- Notable work: TowerFall, Celeste

Madeline Stephanie Thorson (born Matt Thorson, 18 March 1988) is a Canadian video game developer, known as one of the lead creators for the video games TowerFall and Celeste, developed under the studio Maddy Makes Games (previously Matt Makes Games). Since September 2019, Thorson has worked as Director of R&D at Extremely OK Games.

== Early life ==
Madeline Stephanie Thorson was born on 18 March 1988. Thorson went to college at Grande Prairie Regional College in Alberta, Canada, studying computer science, during which one summer she worked at HermitWorks Entertainment, a local video game development studio.

== Career ==
=== Maddy Makes Games ===
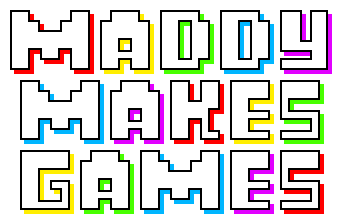
Maddy Makes Games' logo

When Thorson was around fourteen, her mother helped her acquire a copy of GameMaker, a software tool to help develop video games. Through working in GameMaker, she was connected to others in online forums who were also interested in making games, including Chevy Ray Johnston. She developed a number of small pay-what-you-want games through GameMaker in high school and through college, including Jumper and several sequels, FLaiL, and An Untitled Story. Several of her games were described as "masocore", masochistic games that were extremely difficult for the player to complete; Thorson felt her goal was not to make her games near-impossible but instead to make games that helped direct the player to improve themselves so that the player could beat the challenges she made for them. Early games were published under the name Helix Games, but in April 2008, she rebranded it as Matt Makes Games (later, Maddy Makes Games), considering the name a more important brand for her work.

Thorson's goal in college was to get a computer programming degree and join up with a large game development studio, but as she progressed, she realized she could still make video games without having to be attached to a studio. Following her graduation, Thorson moved into a Vancouver apartment with Johnston where they shared game ideas. Most of these were browser games, and they successfully had a few of theirs published by Adult Swim Games on its site.

Thorson and Johnston were visited by friends they had made online. During a visit by Alec Holowka, he and Thorson participated in a local game jam and came up with an idea of a single-player platform game based on an out-of-shape archer trying to ascend a tower, collecting treasure and money to help with each attempt to climb it. They had considered pitching the idea to Adult Swim Games, but decided to expand the idea on their own, bringing in Johnston to help. The game morphed into a multiplayer battle game, where each player would try to defeat the others by shooting them with a bow-and-arrow while avoiding falling off the tower. Because of the frequent visitors to their apartment, they were able to gain feedback and improve the game to be a party-style title. This would ultimately become TowerFall, Thorson's first major commercial game.

Recognizing the potential success of the title, Johnston suggested that they get a house in Vancouver to bring in others to help, which they acquired around October 2012, calling it the "Indie House" and inviting other collaborators to join them. Thorson incorporated as Matt Makes Games Inc. shortly afterwards in November 2012. Later, Holowka recognized Thorson as TowerFall's main creator and relinquished his stake as a co-creator. Holowka remained on the game's development team as its composer. TowerFall was ultimately developed as an exclusive for the Ouya console. Following its initial release in 2013, the team reissued the game in 2014 as TowerFall: Ascension for most other gaming platforms with additional features. TowerFall: Ascension was critically praised, and within a month had brought in over US$500,000.

In August 2015, Thorson and Noel Berry, another member of the studio, had a four-day game jam to create a PICO-8 game about climbing a mountain with difficult jumping steps. When they completed this, they recognized the opportunity to flesh out the game into a full release, forming the basis of Celeste. Full work on the game started around January 2016. The game was released across multiple platforms in January 2018. By the end of 2018, it had sold more than 500,000 copies, and received numerous industry awards.

=== Romhacking ===
Thorson has developed romhacks for various Mario games, often under the pseudonym "Maddy69xo420". She has released four hacks for Super Mario World including Super Mario World Remix in 2015, Super "Sonic Saves the World" World in 2021, Sure Shot in 2022, and Masterpiece in 2025. She designed levels for the SMW Kaizo Relay Race collaboration hacks for Games Done Quick in 2022 and 2024 and released a level for the Super Mario 64 hack Mario Builder 64 titled Ocean Spire on May 24, 2024. Her hacks have been featured at various speedrunning events including Romhack Races and Summer Games Done Quick 2023 & 2024.

=== Extremely OK Games ===
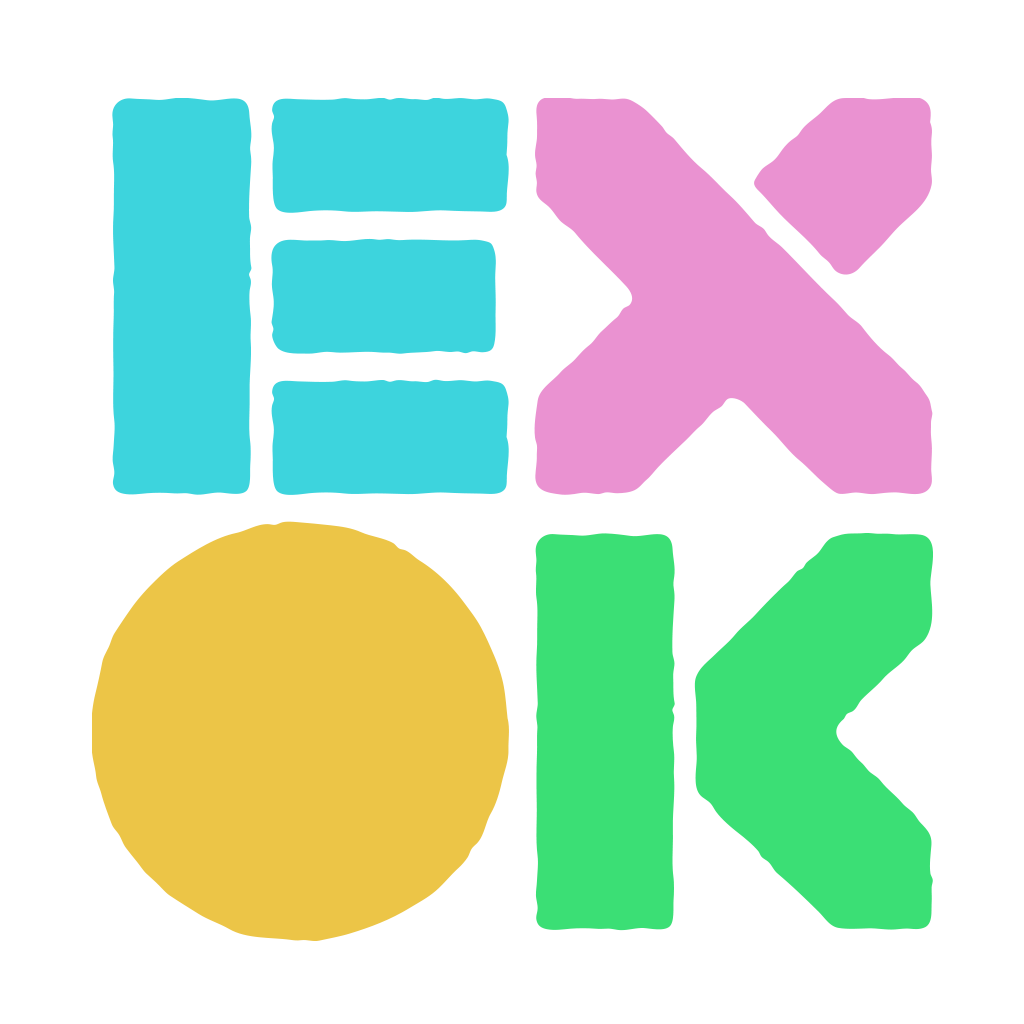
Extremely OK Games' logo

On 5 September 2019, Thorson announced that she was effectively shutting down Maddy Makes Games, while re-establishing the same team under the new name Extremely OK Games (abbreviated EXOK). The purpose of the change was twofold. First, the new name recognized that Thorson was not the sole creative force behind the games and ensured that the whole team was fully recognized and shared in the collective output from the company. Second, the change coincided with a move to a new set of offices in Vancouver to house the entire team, which had been previously spread across the world, including some in São Paulo. EXOK was technically founded in March 2019, but the first six months had been spent working to move these international developers into Canada and dealing with immigration requirements. The "Extremely OK" name itself came from a humorous tweet that operations manager Heidy Motta had seen that wished its readers an "extremely OK afternoon".

Thorson stated that TowerFall and Celeste would remain published under Maddy Makes Games, and that the team had already started the early exploratory work for their next title, codenamed "EXOK-1". With everyone in EXOK working in the same office, it had made development time faster, allowing them to test through multiple prototype games to come onto their next project within six months. The team went through three prototypes (named EXOK 1 through 3) which Thorson said "ventured way too far from our comfort zone for them to realistically ever get finished", before coming up with a fourth prototype that evolved into their first game under the "Extremely OK" name, Earthblade, announced in April 2021, described as an "explor-action" game in a "seamless pixel art world". The game was formally announced at The Game Awards 2022 with a planned 2024 release date, but was pushed back an unspecified time in March 2024. In January 2025, Thorson, on the company's blog, announced that the game had been canceled, citing a dispute over intellectual property rights of Celeste that led to the loss of a studio member, and struggles with development as among the reasons.

==== Notable games ====
| Year | Title |
|---|---|
| 2004 | Jumper |
| 2004 | Jumper Two |
| 2008 | Jumper Three |
| 2013 | TowerFall |
| 2015 | Celeste Classic |
| 2018 | Celeste |
| 2021 | Celeste Classic 2: Lani's Trek |
| 2022 | Sure Shot |
| 2024 | Celeste 64: Fragments of the Mountain |
| 2025 | Masterpiece |

==== Canceled games ====
| Title | Platform(s) |
|---|---|
| Earthblade | Windows |

== Personal life ==
Thorson is transgender and uses she/her pronouns. By around 2020, she had adopted the name Maddy Thorson. In the Farewell DLC to the game Celeste, the final cutscene shows the character Madeline in her room with a rainbow flag and transgender flag. Thorson later confirmed that Madeline was trans in a blog post which also reflected on her own coming to terms with her gender identity.

Thorson and her partner have been parents to a child since 2022. She said in 2024 that, due to the responsibilities of parenthood, she was unlikely to develop a multiplayer game in the future.

== Reception ==
Thorson was named by Forbes as one of their "30 Under 30" for gaming in 2014, recognizing her for the development of TowerFall.
