= Full Indie =

- Formation: May 2010; 16 years ago
- Founder: Jake Birkett, Alex Vostrov
- Headquarters: Vancouver
- Location: Canada
- Fields: Independent video game development

Full Indie is a Vancouver, Canada based non-profit organization by and for independent video game developers. The organization hosts monthly meet-ups, game jams and organizes the yearly developer conference Full Indie Summit. Full Indie was originally started by Indie game developers Jake Birkett and Alex Vostrov in May 2010 as monthly meet-ups for local Indie developers. Due to the overwhelming response and positive feedback, Birkett and Vostrov created FullIndie.com in 2011. As of 2014, the organization had more than 2000 members.

== Full Indie Summit ==
The first Full Indie Summit was organized in 2013 as a response to the migration of prominent video game studios and developer conferences such as GDC Canada away from Vancouver. The summit aims to connect and unify the larger Indie community in the Pacific North West and to provide opportunities for networking and information exchange. Past summits have also attracted large companies such as Sony and Nintendo.

== Branches ==
FullIndie.com has a British branch organization called FullIndie.uk (formerly known as Best of British). It was created in 2012.
