= Sayward Forest Canoe Route =

Canoe route in British Columbia, Canada

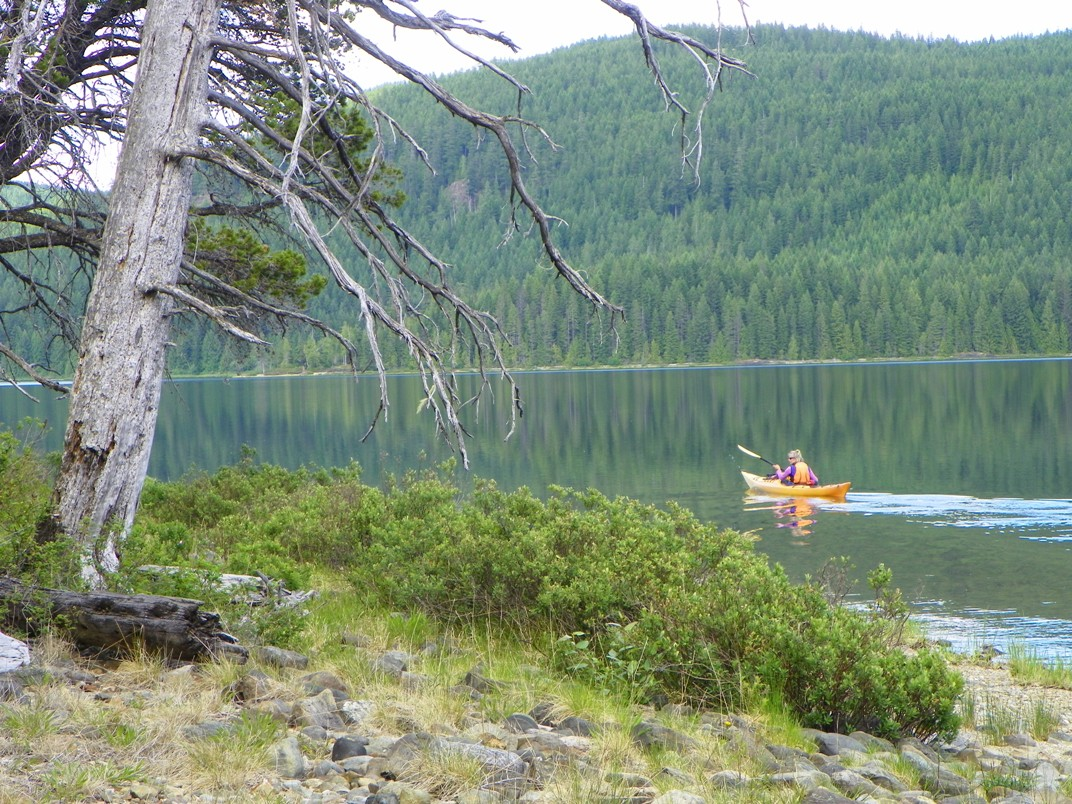
Kayaking on Brewster Lake, part of the Sayward Forest Canoe Route

The Sayward Forest Canoe Route runs through a series of lakes west of Campbell River.

It takes about three to five days to complete the full 48 kilometre circuit. There are 13 portages totally about 7.6 kilometres of portaging. Some of the portages allow for canoes to be wheeled.

The route passes through the following lakes in a loop:

- Mohun Lake
- Twin Lake
- Amor Lake
- Whymper Lake
- Surprise Lake
- Brewster Lake
- Gray Lake
- Fry Lake
- Lower Campbell Lake
- Gosling Lake
- Higgins Lake
- Lawier Lake
