= Wolf River (British Columbia) =

River in British Columbia, Canada

- Location of the mouth of the Wolf River in British Columbia

Location
- Country: Canada
- Province: British Columbia
- Land District: Nootka Land District
- Regional District: Strathcona Regional District

Physical characteristics
- Source: Schjelderup Lake
  - coordinates: 49°38′08″N 125°43′22″W
  - elevation: 1,263 m (4,144 ft)
- Mouth: Buttle Lake
  - coordinates: 49°46′21″N 125°37′37″W
  - elevation: 223 m (732 ft)
- Length: 21 km (13 mi)

Basin features
- River system: Pacific Ocean drainage basin

The Wolf River is a river on Vancouver Island in Strathcona Regional District, British Columbia, Canada. It is in the Pacific Ocean drainage basin, and lies entirely within Strathcona Provincial Park.

== Course ==
The river begins at Schjelderup Lake and heads north, then turns northeast below Mount Con Reid to reach its mouth on the west side of Buttle Lake, the source of the Campbell River.

== Recreation ==
There are two campgrounds on either side of the river mouth at Buttle Lake: Titus Marine Campground on the north side and Wolf River Marine Campground on the south side.

== See also ==
- List of rivers of British Columbia
