= Myra Falls (Vancouver Island) =

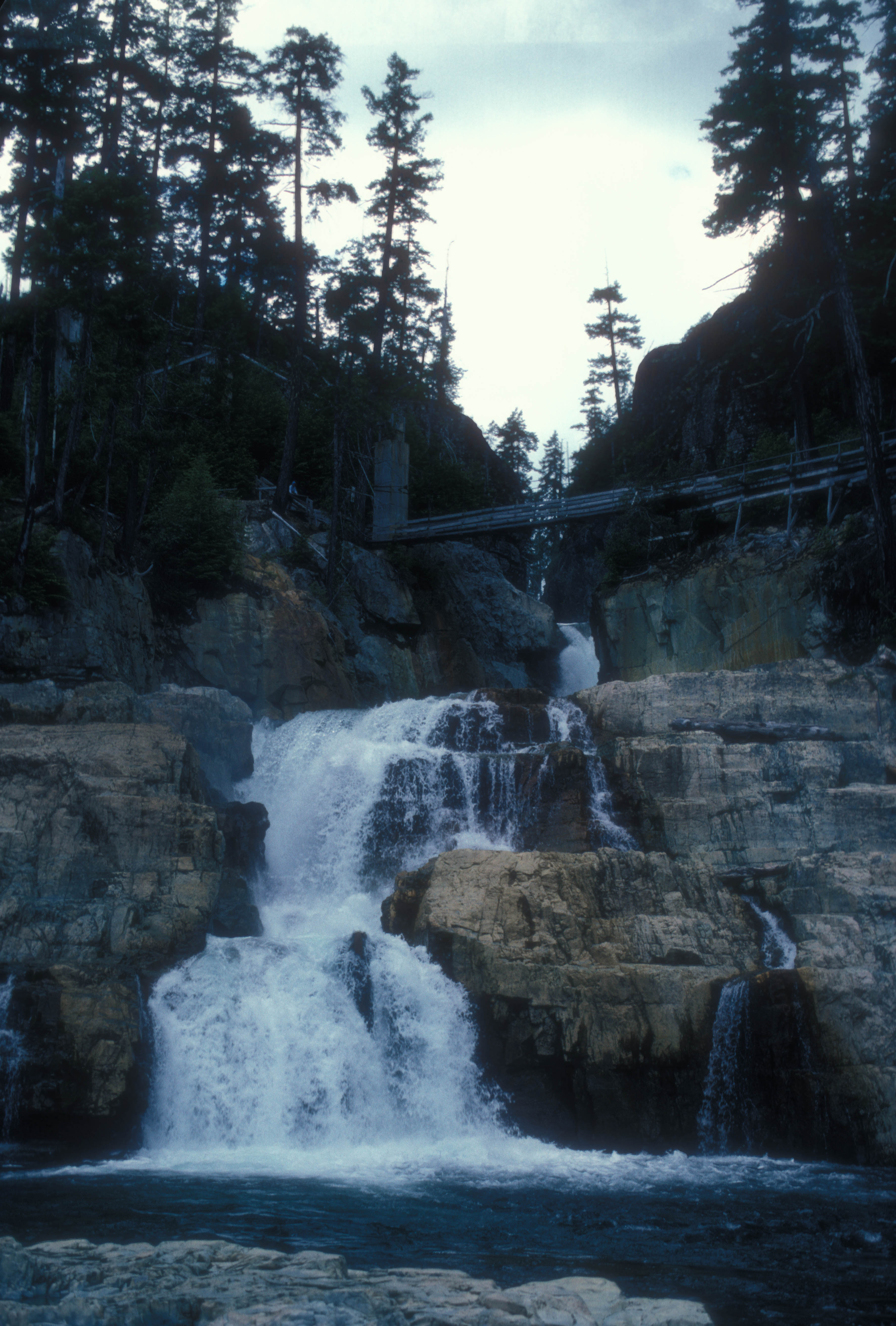
- Myra Falls

- Location within British Columbia
- Location: Strathcona-Westmin Provincial Park, British Columbia
- Coordinates: 49°34′42″N 125°33′55″W
- Type: Tiered Plunges
- Total height: 61 m (200 ft)
- Number of drops: 7
- Run: 305 m (1,001 ft)
- Watercourse: Myra Creek

Myra Falls, also known as Lower Myra Falls, is a waterfall located at the southern end of Buttle Lake on Vancouver Island in British Columbia. The falls are protected within Strathcona-Westmin Provincial Park.

== Description ==
Myra Falls is a seven-tiered plunge waterfall that cascades down into the southern end of Buttle Lake from a small hanging valley. The falls are accessible to the public via a paved road to the Myra Falls mine gate followed by an easy 1.5 km (0.93 mi) hiking trail downstream. The falls are also accessible by boat via Buttle Lake.

=== Upper Myra Falls ===
Upper Myra Falls is a 23 m (75 ft) high sliding punchbowl waterfall set in a densely forested canyon. The falls are located 6 km (3.7 mi) upstream from Myra Falls at the end of a 7.5 km (4.7 mi) long, moderately difficult hiking trail.

== History ==
The falls and Myra Creek were named for Myra Ellison, daughter of Price Ellison who was part of the exploratory survey in 1910 that preceded the creation of Strathcona Provincial Park.

== See also ==
- List of waterfalls in British Columbia
- Della Falls
