= Golden Hinde (mountain) =

Mountain of the Vancouver Island Ranges in British Columbia, Canada

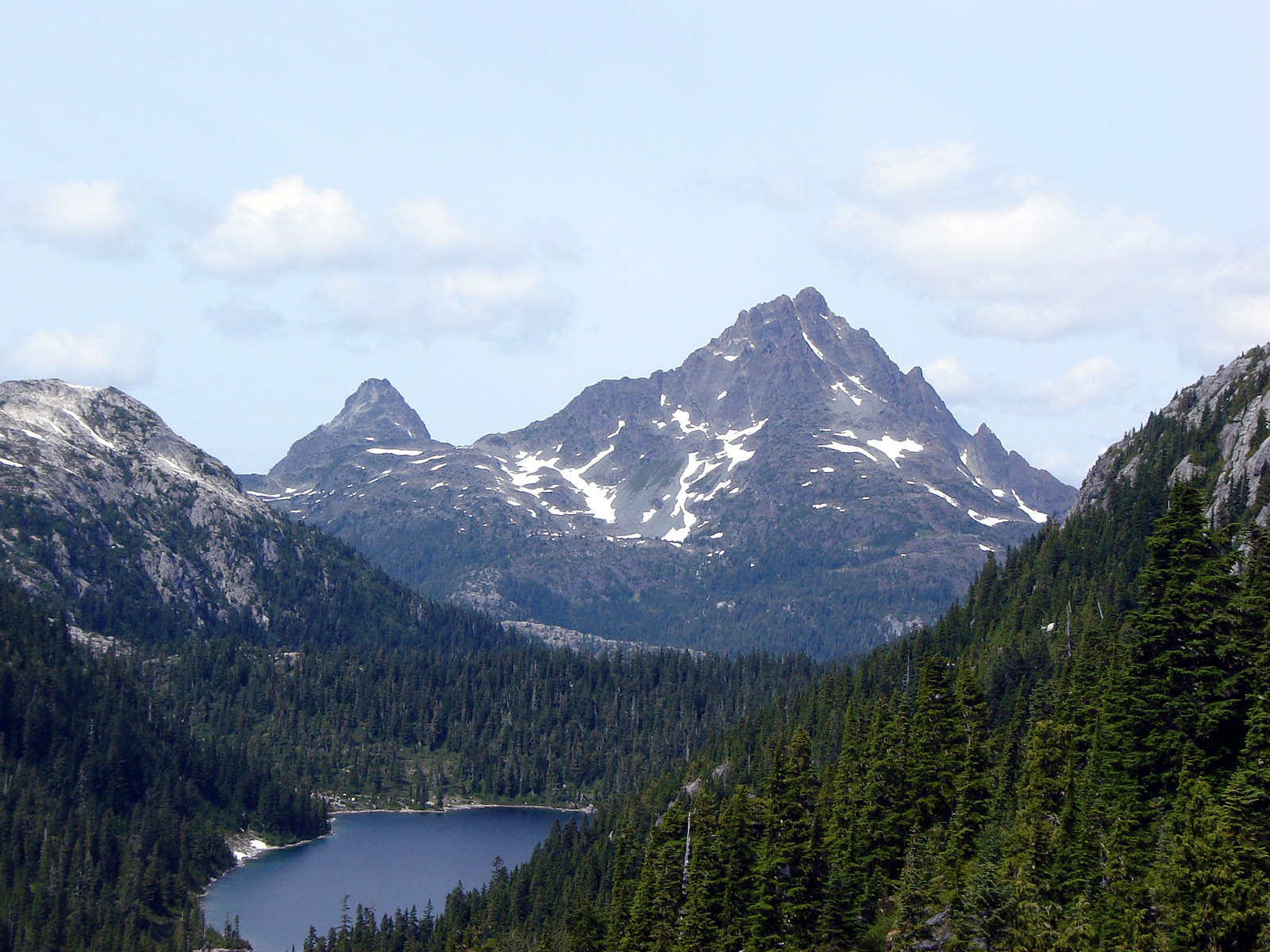
- Golden Hinde, south aspect, August 2006.

Highest point
- Elevation: 2,195 m (7,201 ft)
- Prominence: 2,195 m (7,201 ft)
- Listing: Mountains of British Columbia; Highest ocean islands 60th; North America prominent peaks 66th; Ultras of Canada 26th; Ultras of North America 26th; Canada most isolated peaks 38th
- Coordinates: 49°39′46″N 125°44′49″W

Geography
- Location within Vancouver Island Location within British Columbia
- Interactive map of Golden Hinde
- Location: Vancouver Island, British Columbia, Canada
- District: Nootka Land District
- Parent range: Vancouver Island Ranges
- Topo map: NTS 92F12 Buttle Lake

Climbing
- First ascent: Einar Anderson, W.R. Kent 1913 or 1914
- Easiest route: rock climb

The Golden Hinde is a mountain located in the Vancouver Island Ranges on Vancouver Island, British Columbia, Canada. At 2,195 metres (7,201 ft), it is the highest peak on the island. The peak is popular with experienced backcountry-climbers, having been first ascended in 1913. The mountain is made of basalt which is part of the Karmutsen Formation.

== Geography ==
The mountain is located near the geographic centre of Vancouver Island, as well as near the centre of 2,450 km^{2} (605,408 acres) Strathcona Provincial Park, at the head of the Wolf River and to the west of Buttle Lake, about 25 kilometres (16 mi) east of the community of Gold River.

== Name origin ==
The mountain took its name from Sir Francis Drake's ship, the Golden Hind, by an early fur-trading captain, who was reminded of Drake's ship as sunset hit the mountain (which is visible from the west coast of the Island) and in honour of Drake's reputed presence off the coast of the future British Columbia during the explorer's circumnavigation of the globe from 1577 to 1580 (see New Albion).

The present name was not officially conferred until 1938, but this was done after a reference to the peak in a fur-trader's log. The alternative name "The Rooster's Comb" was used by early alpinists because of the mountain's appearance.

== See also ==
- List of Ultras of North America
- Mountain peaks of Canada
- List of the most prominent summits of North America
