= Strathcona-Westmin Provincial Park =

Provincial park in British Columbia

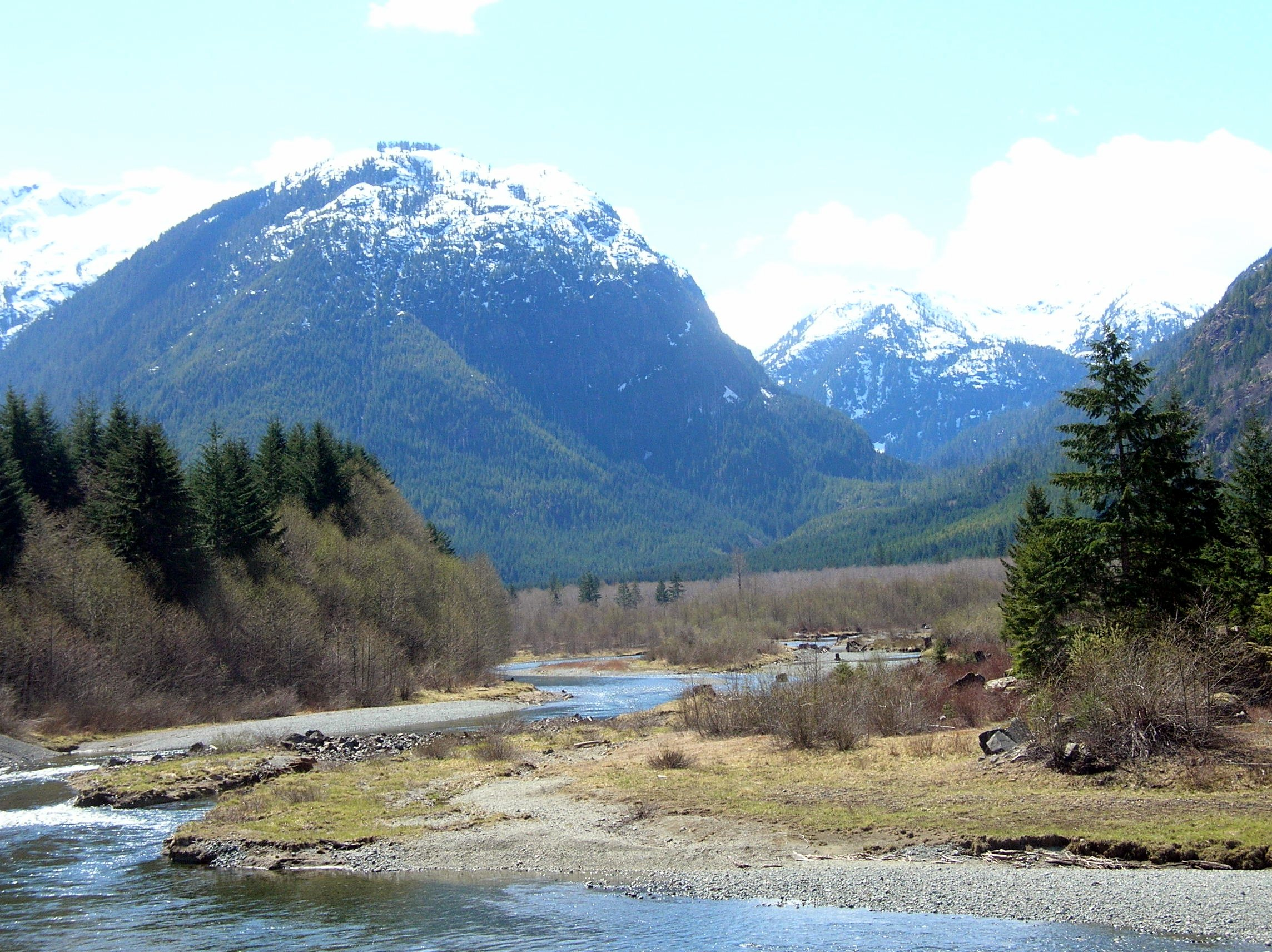

- Location within Vancouver Island Location within British Columbia
- Interactive map of Strathcona-Westmin Provincial Park
- Location: Vancouver Island, British Columbia, Canada
- Nearest city: Gold River
- Coordinates: 49°34′41″N 125°35′41″W
- Area: 3,327.5 ha (12.848 sq mi)
- Designation: Class B Provincial Park
- Established: 14 March 1987
- Governing body: BC Parks
- Website: BC Parks Strathcona-Westmin

Strathcona-Westmin Provincial Park is a Class B provincial park located at the southern extremity of Buttle Lake on Vancouver Island in British Columbia, Canada. The park was separated out from Strathcona Provincial Park by BC Parks in 1987 so that mining operations could proceed within park boundaries. Strathcona-Westmin is expected to be reabsorbed into Strathcona Provincial Park once mining operations cease.

== Description ==
Strathcona-Westmin hosts a dense temperate rainforest ecosystem set in the rugged terrain of the central Vancouver Island Ranges. Much like the surrounding park, Strathcona-Westmin is a popular destination for hiking, backcountry camping, and fishing.

The park also features Myra Falls, a tiered waterfall that empties into Buttle Lake, and Upper Myra Falls, a punchbowl waterfall located 6 km (3.7 mi) further upstream.

== Myra Falls Operation ==
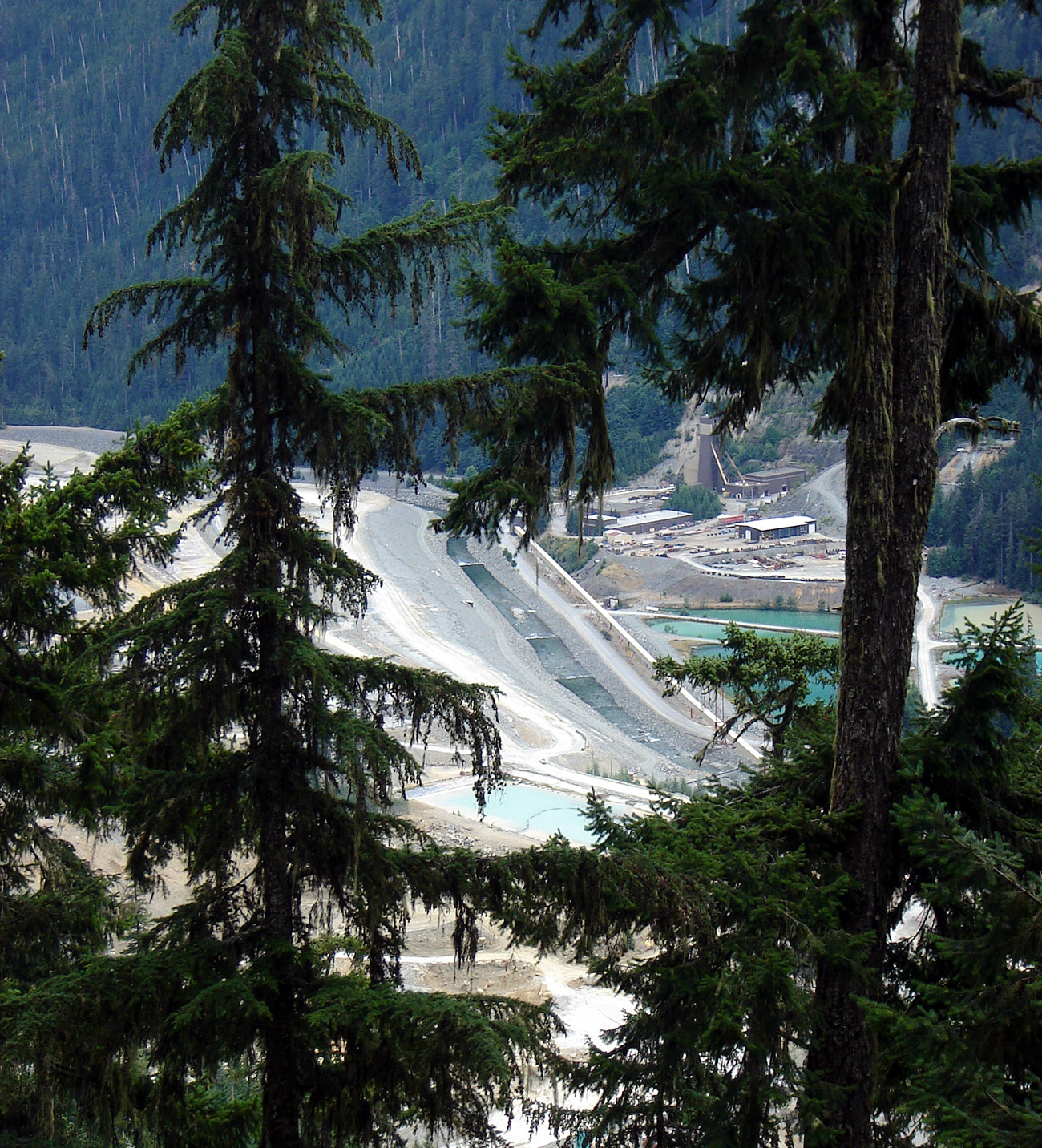
Myra Falls Operation

Myra Falls Operation is an underground mine located within a large stratiform basin in the centre of Strathcona-Westmin Provincial Park. It is owned by Nyrstar Myra Falls Ltd., a subsidiary of European mining company Nyrstar. Mining operations were first approved by the Ministry of Mines and Petroleum Resources on 6 April 1970. The mine started as two small open pits, but quickly became an underground mine with several expansions made since 1980.

The mine produces ore containing copper, lead, zinc, gold, and silver. It has an annual capacity of 1.4 million tonnes of ore.

== See also ==
- Hamber Provincial Park
- Sooke Mountain Provincial Park
