= Surprise Lake (Vancouver Island) =

- Location within Vancouver Island
- Location: Vancouver Island, British Columbia
- Coordinates: 50°08′43″N 125°33′59″W
- Lake type: Natural lake
- Basin countries: Canada

Surprise Lake is a lake located on Vancouver Island north of Brewster Lake and south of Amor Lake.

== See also ==
- List of lakes of British Columbia
