= Elk Falls Provincial Park =

Canadian tourist attraction

- IUCN category II (national park)
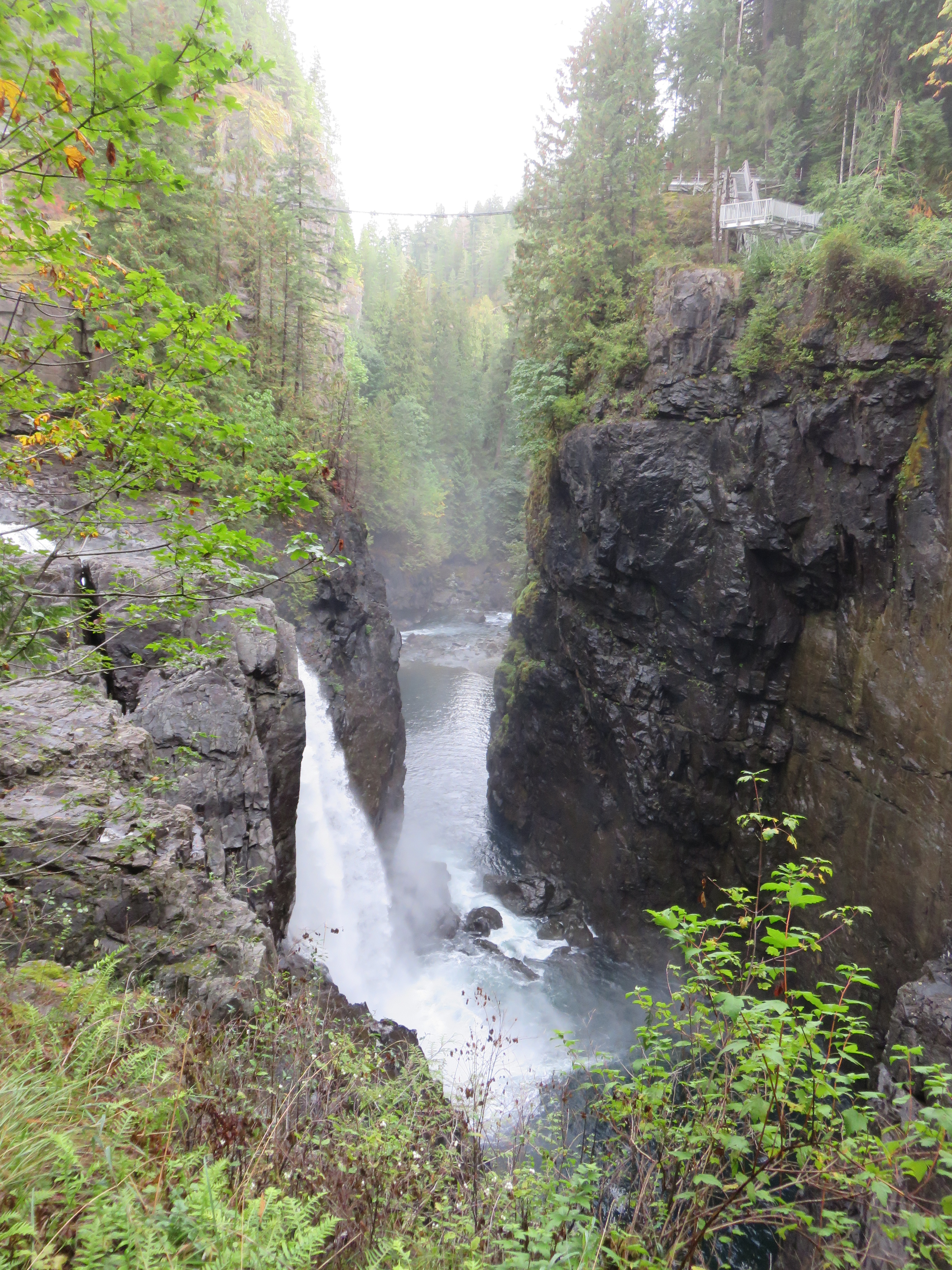
- A view of Elk Falls and the Campbell River

- Location within Vancouver Island Location within British Columbia
- Interactive map of Elk Falls Provincial Park
- Location: Sayward Land District, British Columbia, Canada
- Nearest city: Campbell River, BC
- Coordinates: 50°02′29″N 125°19′15″W
- Area: 1,055 ha (2,610 acres)
- Established: December 20, 1940
- Governing body: BC Parks
- Website: bcparks.ca/elk-falls-park/

Elk Falls Provincial Park is a provincial park in British Columbia, Canada. It is 1,807 hectares (4,470 acres) in size and is located at the east end of John Hart Lake on the northwest side of the city of Campbell River, on Vancouver Island.

The Park was established in 1940 to protect the waterfall and canyon. In 1947, the John Hart Dam and Generating Station was completed, followed by two other dams upstream, Strathcona and Ladore. Most of the water that used to flow over the falls is now diverted for power production. A suspension bridge over the canyon was completed in 2015, and provides a good view of Elk Falls.
