= Karmutsen Formation =

Late Triassic volcanic sequence on Vancouver Island, British Columbia, Canada

The Karmutsen Formation is a geological formation in British Columbia, Canada, named after the Karmutsen Range on northern Vancouver Island. It consists of basaltic lava flows, flow breccias and pillow lavas that are interbedded with massive grey limestone, tuff and minor siltstone. The Karmutsen Formation is the most abundant rock unit in Vancouver Island's Strathcona Provincial Park, the oldest provincial park in British Columbia. A massive pile of basaltic lava flows up to 6.5 km (4.0 mi) thick occurs in this park and comprises about half of the mountains there. Most of the mountains west of Buttle Lake and south of Upper Campbell Lake and the Elk River consist of pillow lava. In the Haida Gwaii archipelago, the Karmutsen Formation rarely occurs on Graham Island, but it is well exposed on Moresby Island and neighbouring islands.

The Karmutsen Formation is of Late Triassic age, having formed during a voluminous flood basalt event 225 to 230 million years ago. This volcanic activity resulted in the formation of a large, shallow, oceanic plateau, but some of the magma also intruded through layers of lava to create dikes and sills. The lava issued from rift zones of broad shield volcanoes similar to those comprising the Hawaiian Islands.

== See also ==
- Volcanism of Western Canada
