= Lower Campbell Lake =

Lake in British Columbia, Canada

- Location within Vancouver Island
- Coordinates: 50°01′18.3″N 125°27′53.3″W
- Primary inflows: Campbell River
- Primary outflows: Campbell River
- First flooded: 1958
- Surface area: 2,694 ha (6,660 acres)
- Average depth: 17.1 m (56 ft)
- Max. depth: 75.6 m (248 ft)
- Water volume: 458,784,000 m^{3} (1.62018×10^{10} cu ft)
- Residence time: 32 days
- Shore length^{1}: 89.2 km (55.4 mi)
- Surface elevation: 178 m (584 ft)
- ^{1} Shore length is not a well-defined measure.

Lower Campbell Lake, also known as Campbell Lake, is a reservoir on Vancouver Island in British Columbia, Canada. The lake is impounded by the Ladore Dam, which was completed in 1958. Resident fish species in the lake include Cutthroat trout, Rainbow trout, Dolly varden, Kokanee salmon, prickly sculpin and threespine stickleback.

== Geography ==
Lower Campbell Lake is located approximately 10 kilometres (6.2 mi) west of the city of Campbell River. It makes up the southern portion of the Sayward Forest Canoe Route. The lake has a surface area of 2,694 hectares (6,660 acres) and has a mean depth of 17.1 metres (56 ft), with a maximum depth of 75.6 metres (248 ft).

Its outflow is the Campbell River, which flows in from Upper Campbell Lake through the Strathcona Dam, and out via the Ladore Dam into John Hart Lake. Other tributaries include the Beavertail, Fry, Greenstone and Miller creeks, with water from the Salmon and Quinsam rivers diverted into the lake. Prior to the construction of the dam, Lower Campbell Lake had a surface area of 1,075 metres (3,527 ft). The lake lies in the Coastal Western Hemlock Biogeoclimatic Zone.

== See also ==
- List of lakes of British Columbia
