= Mount Con Reid =

Mountain in British Columbia, Canada

- Location within Vancouver Island Location within British Columbia
- Interactive map of Mount Con Reid

Highest point
- Elevation: 1,743 m (5,719 ft)
- Prominence: 345 m (1,132 ft)
- Coordinates: 49°44′44.2″N 125°44′12.8″W

Geography
- Location: Vancouver Island, British Columbia, Canada
- District: Nootka Land District
- Parent range: Vancouver Island Ranges
- Topo map: NTS 92F12 Buttle Lake

Mount Con Reid is a mountain on Vancouver Island, British Columbia, Canada, located 23 km (14 mi) east of Gold River and 4 km (2 mi) northeast of El Piveto Mountain in Nootka Land District.

== See also ==
- List of mountains in Canada
