= Sooke Mountain Provincial Park =

Provincial park on Vancouver Island, Canada

- IUCN category II (national park)
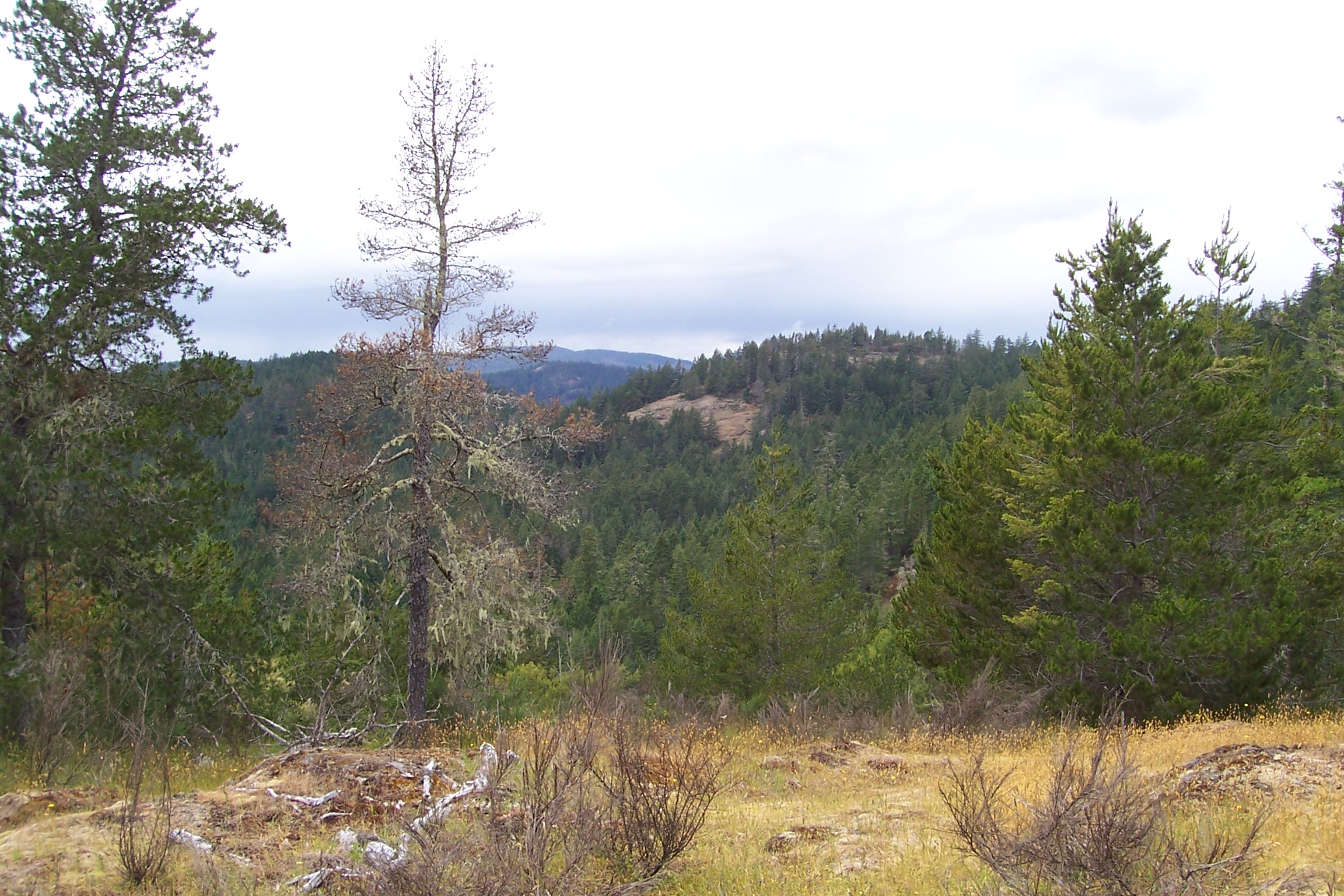
- View north from the northwestern slope of Mount Manuel Quimper

- Location within Vancouver Island Location within British Columbia Location within Capital Regional District
- Interactive map of Sooke Mountain Provincial Park
- Location: Capital Regional District, British Columbia, Canada
- Nearest city: Sooke
- Coordinates: 48°26′22″N 123°39′31″W
- Area: 450 ha (1,100 acres)
- Designation: Class B Provincial Park
- Established: June 25, 1928
- Governing body: BC Parks

Sooke Mountain Provincial Park is a Class B provincial park located at the southern end of Vancouver Island in British Columbia, Canada. The park was established on June 25, 1928, to protect local wildlife and preserve the scenic wilderness of the area. Sooke Mountain is now part of the larger Sea to Sea Green Blue Belt surrounding Greater Victoria.

== History ==
The park was originally used as a wilderness destination by the Canadian Pacific Railway where visitors could stay at a private lodge overlooking Sheilds Lake. The lodge burned down in the 1960s with only its brick foundation remaining.

The park and its neighbouring properties was logged during the 1950s.

== Activities ==
The park is largely undeveloped with no park facilities. Fishing, hunting, and backcountry hiking are popular activities. Off-road vehicles are prohibited within the park.

== See also ==
- Sooke Potholes Provincial Park
- Strathcona-Westmin Provincial Park
