= Strathcona Provincial Park =

Provincial park in British Columbia, Canada

- IUCN category II (national park)
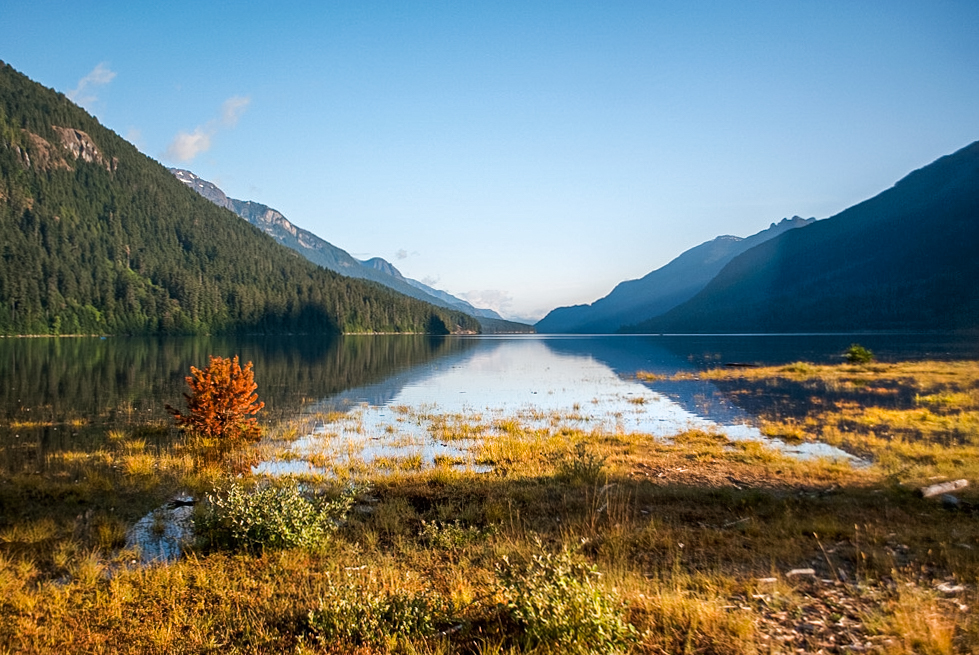
- Buttle Lake, located in the centre of the park

- Location within Vancouver Island Location within British Columbia
- Interactive map of Strathcona Provincial Park
- Location: Vancouver Island, British Columbia, Canada
- Nearest city: Gold River, Campbell River
- Coordinates: 49°38′59″N 125°45′00″W
- Area: 2,458.07 km^{2} (949.07 sq mi)
- Established: March 1, 1911
- Governing body: BC Parks
- Website: bcparks.ca/explore/parkpgs/strath/

Strathcona Provincial Park is the oldest provincial park in British Columbia, Canada, and the largest on Vancouver Island. Founded in 1911, the park was named for Donald Alexander Smith, 1st Baron Strathcona and Mount Royal, a wealthy philanthropist and railway pioneer. It lies within the Strathcona Regional District. The Clayoquot Sound Biosphere Reserve, established in 2000, includes three watersheds in the western area of the park.

== Geography ==
The park is 9 kilometres (5.6 mi) east of Gold River and 25 kilometres (16 mi) west of Campbell River. At 2,458 km^{2} (949 sq mi), it contains the highest peaks of the Vancouver Island Ranges. Some notable mountains located within the park boundaries include:

- Golden Hinde - 2,198 m (7,211 ft)
- Elkhorn Mountain - 2,166 m (7,106 ft)
- Mount Colonel Foster - 2,129 m (6,985 ft)
- Mount Albert Edward - 2,093 m (6,867 ft)

Strathcona Park is also known for its lakes, waterfalls, and glaciers. Buttle Lake is a popular destination for swimming, canoeing, kayaking, and fishing. Also located in the park is Della Falls which, at 440 m (1,440 ft) in height, is among the highest waterfalls in Canada.

The 6,500 m (21,000 ft) thick Karmutsen Formation is the most abundant rock unit in the park. It is a pile of tholeiitic pillow basalts and breccias. It is also the oldest, thickest and most widespread formation on Vancouver Island found on Triple Peak, Cat's Ears Peak and the Mackenzie Range.

== Ecology ==
- Sub-alpine ecosystem: western redcedar, Douglas fir, grand fir, amabilis fir, western hemlock, mountain hemlock and creeping juniper.
- Wildlife: Roosevelt elk, Vancouver Island marmot, Vancouver Island wolf, black bear, cougar and the coastal black-tailed deer.
- Birds: chestnut-backed chickadee, red-breasted nuthatch, winter wren and kinglet, Canada jay, Steller's jay, blue grouse, ruffed grouse and white-tailed ptarmigan.

== History ==
This area is the traditional territory of the Mowachaht and Muchalaht people of the Mowachaht/Muchalaht First Nations. Commander John Buttle, for whom Buttle Lake is named, first explored the area in the 1860s. In 1890, the British Columbia government conducted a survey to define the boundaries of the E&N Railway land grant. The grant, given to Robert Dunsmuir's company in exchange for the construction of the railway, extended from Muir Creek, near Sooke at the southern end of Vancouver Island, in a straight line to Crown Mountain. All of the land between that line and the east coast of Vancouver Island was included in the grant. The line that formed the west boundary of the grant became the east boundary of Strathcona Park when it was created in 1911.

Although originally planned to reach Campbell River, the railway was never constructed past Courtenay. At the time of the grant, the area within the present park boundaries was considered unexplored.

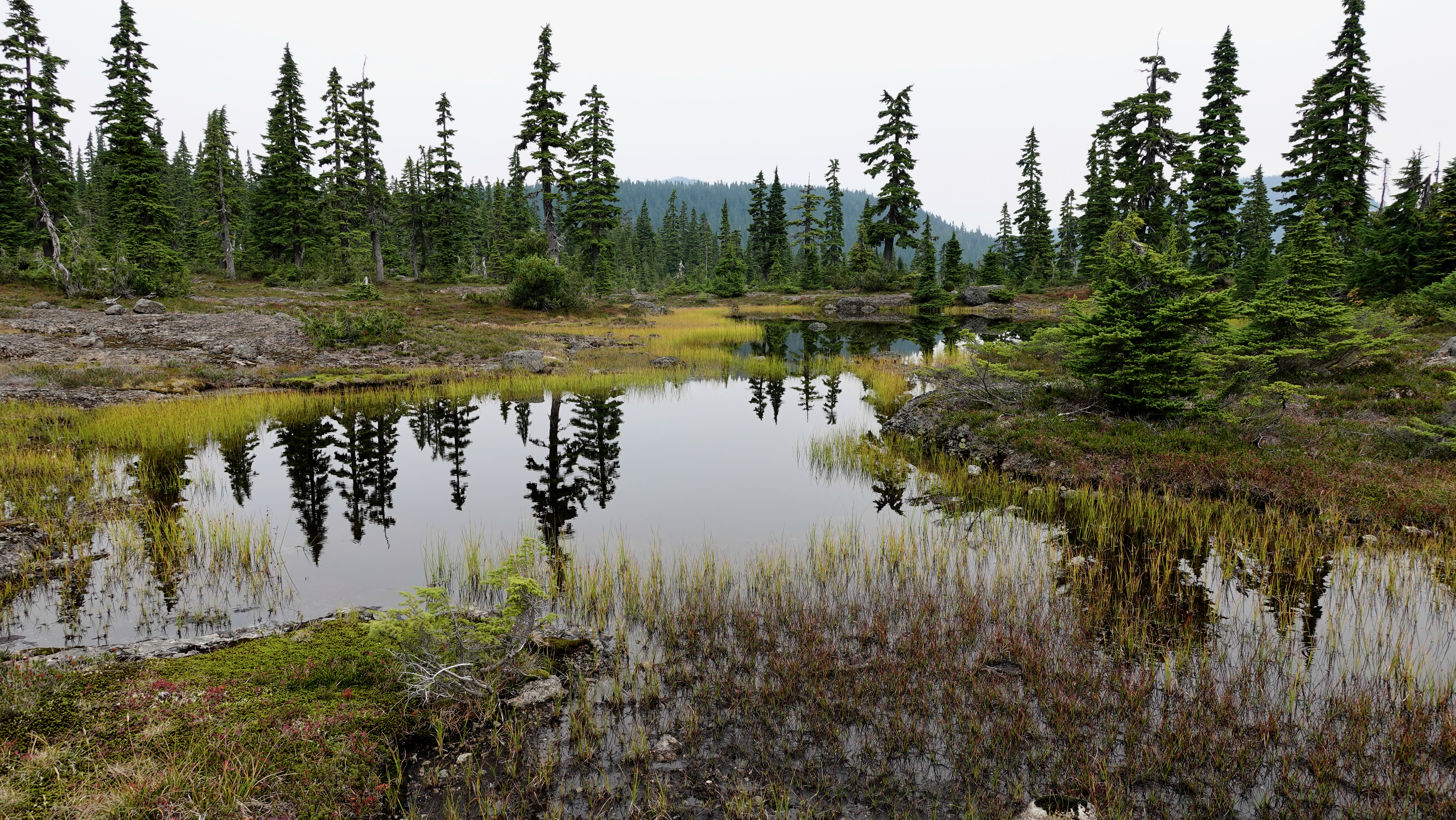
One of the many lakes of the Forbidden Plateau.

In 1894 and 1896, the area was explored by Reverend William W. Bolton. Bolton's explorations and federal government interest in establishing a national park led BC Premier Sir Richard McBride to set aside a park reserve in June 1910. McBride's Minister of Lands, Price Ellison, lead an expedition to explore the new park reserve which included the first ascent of Crown Mountain on July 29, 1910. W.W. Urquhart led a survey party, which included photographer W.R. Kent and Einar Anderson, throughout the park area in 1913 and 1914. They climbed many of the peaks and named geographic features throughout the park.

The First World War caused elaborate plans for a railway and two hotels to be abandoned. As part of the war effort, there was logging in the Elk River Valley.

Over the years which have followed, other industrial uses have affected the park.

=== Mining claims ===
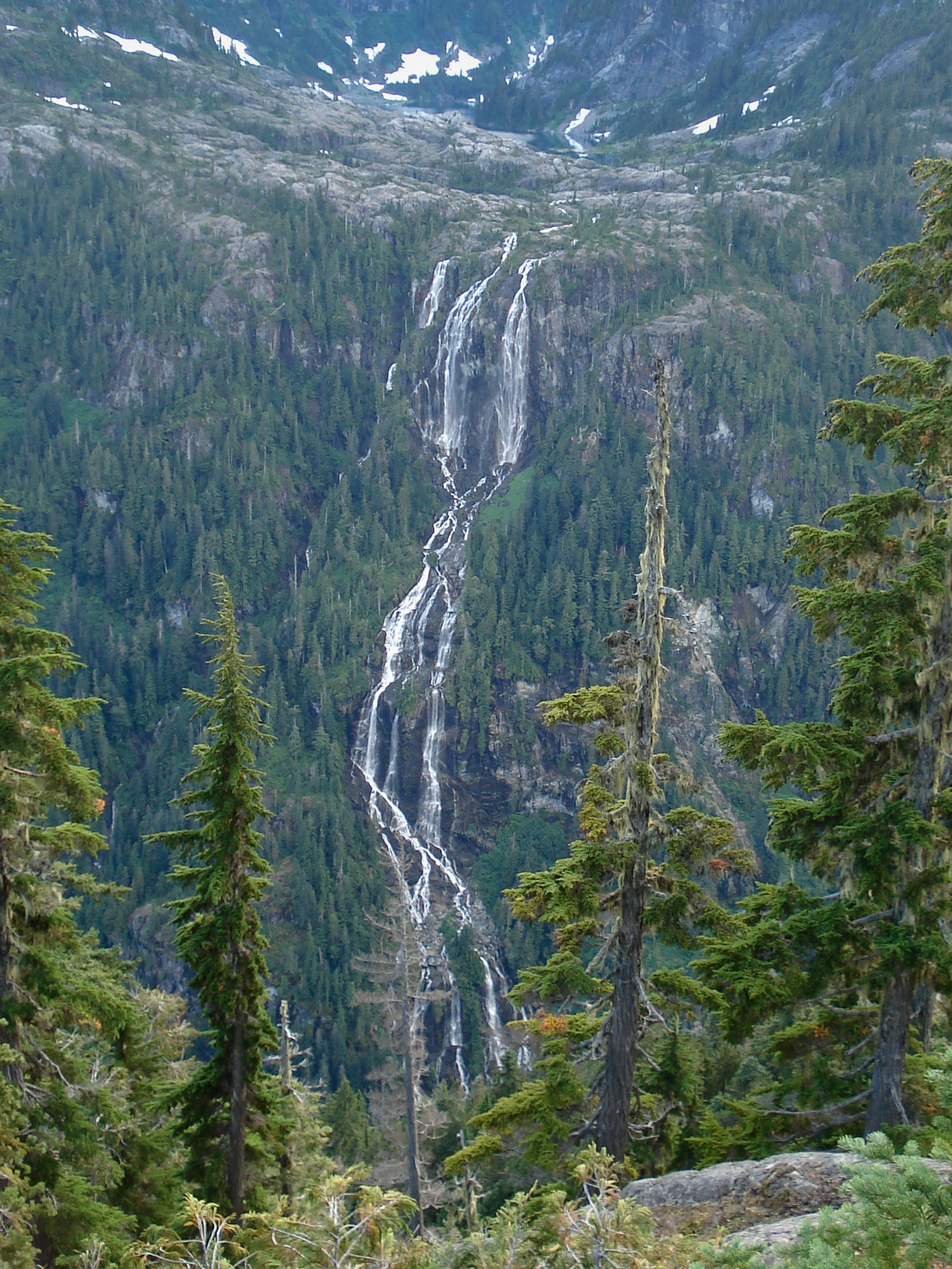
Della Falls, the second tallest waterfall on Vancouver Island.

Mineral claims were staked in the park as early as 1911. In 1939, mining and logging became permitted in the park and in 1959 the Myra Falls Mine (originally owned by Westmin) was opened. This mine continues to operate in a section of the park called Strathcona-Westmin Provincial Park. This area is entirely within the larger park and comprises 1.5% of the total area. As a Class B park, it is intended to cease its existence and return to the main park when the mine eventually ceases operations. The mine is currently owned by Nyrstar and produces zinc, lead, copper, silver and gold concentrates.

In the mid-1950s, 600 hectares (1,500 acres) around the shoreline of Buttle Lake was logged to accommodate the increase in water levels from the creation of the Strathcona Dam in 1955-1958, impounding Upper Campbell Lake. Strathcona Dam is one of the three hydroelectric dams built to power the John Hart Generating Station on the Campbell River. The variation in water levels in Buttle Lake periodically exposes the stumps.

=== 1980s - 90s ===
In 1987, the provincial government announced plans to remove large areas from the park for logging and other industrial uses. The Friends of Strathcona formed a blockade which attracted significant media attention and resulted in the arrest of 63 protesters. The government engaged Peter Larkin to conduct an independent review of the future of the park which eventually resulted in the Strathcona Park Master Plan. Most of the park is designated a conservation area under this plan. The Strathcona Park Public Advisory Committee was set up at this time to provide advice to BC Parks when making management decisions concerning the park.

In 1995, the McBride Creek area (37.5 km^{2} (14.5 sq mi)) and the Megin watershed (273.9 km^{2} (105.8 sq mi)) were added to the park. Later, the Divers and Rossitor Lake addition was included as well.

== Recreation ==
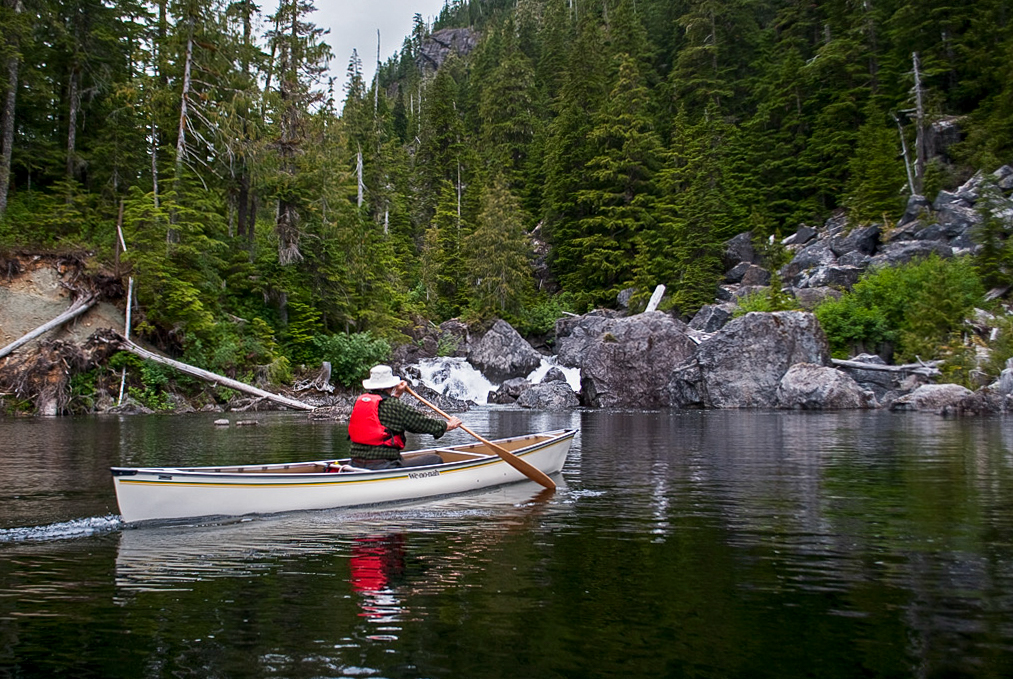
Canoeing on Jim Mitchell Lake near the southern end of the park.

The park is a popular destination for hikers and mountain climbers, as well as swimmers, canoeists, and kayakers. There is an extensive network of hiking trails in the park; visitor facilities are located at Buttle Lake and Forbidden Plateau. The park includes campgrounds, backpacking and cross-country skiing trails, and downhill skiing. There is fishing, in season, for cutthroat, rainbow, and Dolly Varden trout. Campfires are banned in all areas of the park, except in provided fire pits.

Although there are no commercial tourist facilities in the park itself, the nearby Strathcona Park Lodge and Outdoor Education Centre provides outdoors education. Visitor facilities are available in the nearby communities of Campbell River and Gold River. Mount Washington Alpine Resort, which offers downhill and cross-country skiing, is located adjacent to the park. The Strathcona Park Lodge also offers weekend camps for tourists or international students with activities such as rock climbing, kayaking, hiking, swimming, etc.

== See also ==
- List of British Columbia Provincial Parks
- List of Canadian provincial parks
- List of National Parks of Canada

== Sources ==
- Philip Stone (2003). Island Alpine, A Guide to the Mountains of Strathcona Park and Vancouver Island. Wild Isle Publications: Heriot Bay, BC. ISBN 0-9680766-5-3.
- Donald F. MacLachlan (1986). The Esquimalt & Nanaimo Railway - The Dunsmuir Years: 1884-1905. The B.C. Historical Railway Association. ISBN 0-9692511-0-6.
- Lindsay J. Elms (1996). Beyond Nootka: a historical perspective of Vancouver Island mountains. Misthorn Press. ISBN 0-9680159-0-5.
- Strathcona Provincial Park Master Plan, April 1993, BC Parks ISBN 0-7726-1812-7 Retrieved October 28, 2006.
- Strathcona Provincial Park Master Plan Amendment, June 2001, BC Parks ISBN 0-7726-4730-5 Document includes Vision Statement for the 21st Century. Retrieved October 28, 2006.
