= John Hart Dam =

- Location on Vancouver Island Location within British Columbia
- Interactive map of John Hart Dam
- Official name: John Hart Dam
- Location: Campbell River, British Columbia, Canada
- Coordinates: 50°02′23″N 125°20′03″W
- Opening date: 1947

Reservoir
- Creates: John Hart Lake

Power Station
- Operator: BC Hydro
- Turbines: 3
- Installed capacity: 132 MW (max.)

The John Hart Dam is one of three hydroelectric dams on the Campbell River, located on Vancouver Island in British Columbia, Canada. The dam is located at the outflow of John Hart Lake. The John Hart Generating Station is located nearby.

== Original Generating Station ==
The BC Power Commission built the first generating station in 1947, it included above ground wood stave penstocks and six turbine-generator units for a total capacity of 126 MW. It was named after John Hart, Premier of BC 1941–1947.

== Earthquake Concerns and Upgrades ==
By 1979 BC Hydro was concerned about the safety of dams built before 1961. A series of earthquakes since then had shown the susceptibility of some dams to liquefaction. A review begun in 1984 discovered the dam was built on loose, saturate sands and silts. The dam was reinforced using injected grout while under full pool.

== Powerhouse Replacement ==
Due to seismic risks, a 68-year-old facility and lower than optimal power generation, in 2014 contracts were awarded to SNC-Lavalin to design and build a generating station and two new 2 km long, six meter penstocks. The new penstocks and powerhouse are located underground. The project included the decommissioning of the old facility in conjunction with the construction and commissioning of the new facility. The 1.1 billion dollar project was completed in 2018. The new powerhouse as a slightly larger capacity at 132.2 megawatts.

== See also ==
- Elk Falls Provincial Park
- List of generating stations in British Columbia
