= Upper Campbell Lake =

Lake in British Columbia, Canada

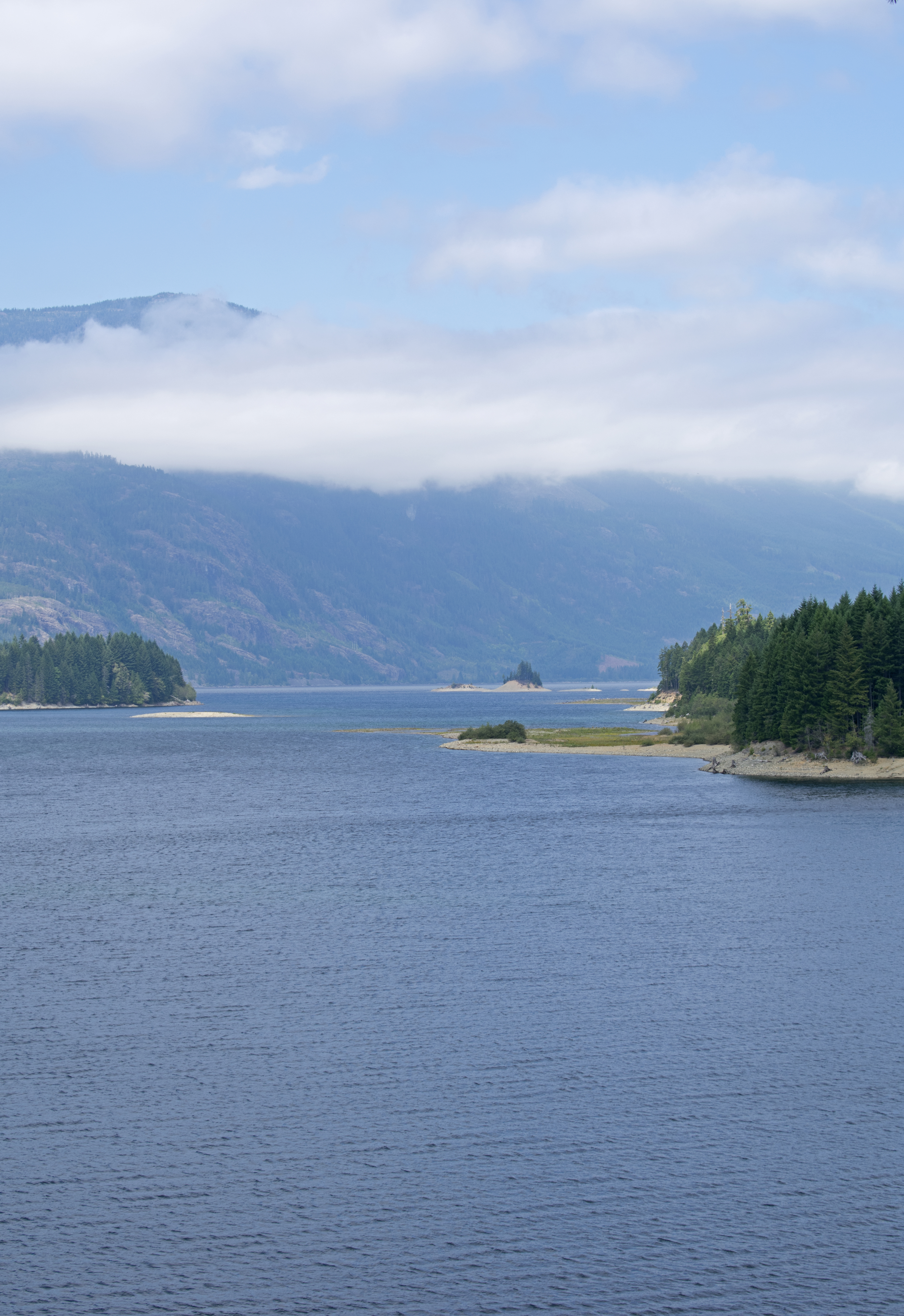

- Location within Vancouver Island
- Coordinates: 49°54′59.4″N 125°39′42.3″W
- Primary inflows: Campbell River, Elk River
- Primary outflows: Campbell River
- First flooded: 1958
- Surface area: 2,978 ha (7,360 acres)
- Average depth: 12.2 m (40 ft)
- Max. depth: 39.6 m (130 ft)
- Water volume: 84,110,400 m^{3} (2.97033×10^{9} cu ft)
- Shore length^{1}: 21.726 km (13.500 mi)
- Surface elevation: 221 m (725 ft)
- ^{1} Shore length is not a well-defined measure.

Upper Campbell Lake is a reservoir on Vancouver Island in British Columbia, Canada. The lake was flooded in 1958 for a large hydroelectric project, which raised the water level by 30 metres (98 ft). Crest Creek and headwaters of the Heber River are diverted into the lake. Part of the lake and its watershed is located in Strathcona Provincial Park, and the Strathcona Park Lodge is located on the eastern side. Freshwater fish species in the lake include Cutthroat trout, Rainbow trout and Dolly varden.

== Geography ==
Upper Campbell Lake is located approximately 40 kilometres (25 mi) west of the city of Campbell River, and 46 kilometres (29 mi) east of the village of Gold River.

Its main tributaries are the Elk River, and the Tlools, Filberg, Cervis and Drum Creeks. Its only outflow is Campbell River, which also flows in from its headwaters nearby at Buttle Lake. The river flows a short distance out of Upper Campbell Lake via the Strathcona Dam into Lower Campbell Lake. Upper Campbell Lake lies in the Coastal Western Hemlock Biogeoclimatic Zone.

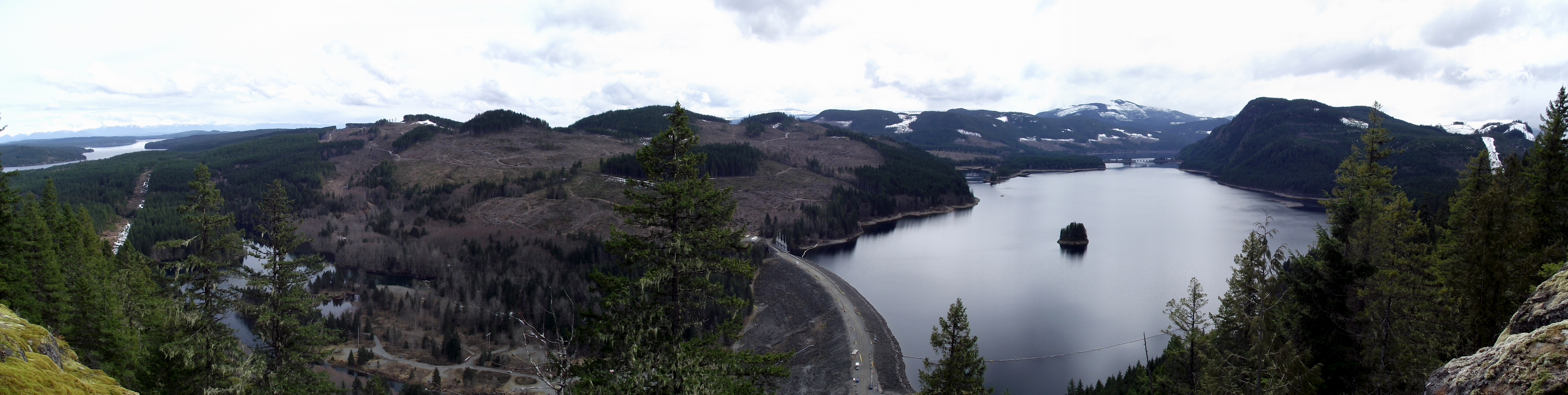
View of Strathcona Dam (center) and Upper Campbell Lake

== History ==
The building of the Strathcona Dam from 1955 to 1958 impounded Upper Campbell Lake, raising the level by 30 metres (98 ft) and causing it to coalesce with Buttle Lake. The damming of the lake also significantly raised the level of the Elk River, another main inflow, which destroyed a large area of elk habitat and has negatively impacted the river function. The flooding removed an estimated 65% of the spawning habitat used by sport fish in the tributaries of the lake. Prior to the dam, Upper Campbell Lake had a surface area of 625 hectares (1,540 acres).

== See also ==
- List of lakes of British Columbia
