= John Hart Lake =

- Location within Vancouver Island
- Coordinates: 50°02′46.1″N 125°22′54.3″W
- Type: Reservoir
- Primary inflows: Campbell River
- Primary outflows: Campbell River
- First flooded: 1947
- Surface area: 362.6 ha (896 acres)
- Average depth: 12.2 m (40 ft)
- Max. depth: 22.9 m (75 ft)
- Water volume: 43,046,400 m^{3} (1.52017×10^{9} cu ft)
- Shore length^{1}: 27.84 km (17.30 mi)
- ^{1} Shore length is not a well-defined measure.

John Hart Lake is a reservoir on Vancouver Island in British Columbia, Canada. The lake was created in 1947 when the John Hart Dam impounded the Campbell River, and is the water source for the city of Campbell River. The Campbell River flows from the lake at the John Hart Dam and via the John Hart generating station. The lake has an area of 362.6 ha (896 acres), with a mean depth of 12.2 metres (40 ft) to a maximum of 22.9 metres (75 ft). The lake is named for John Hart, a Canadian politician who was the 23rd Premier of British Columbia.

== See also ==
- List of lakes of British Columbia
