= BC Parks =

Government agency of British Columbia, Canada

Agency overview
- Formed: March 1, 1911; 115 years ago
- Jurisdiction: British Columbia
- Headquarters: 525 Superior Street Victoria, British Columbia V8V 1T7; 48°25′04″N 123°22′17″W
- Annual budget: $40.6 million (2020)
- Executive Director responsible: Bob C. Austad
- Parent ministry: Ministry of Environment and Parks
- Website: bcparks.ca

BC Parks is an agency of the British Columbia Ministry of Environment and Climate Change Strategy that manages all of the, as of 2020, 1,035 provincial parks and other conservation and historical properties of various title designations within the province's Parks oversaw of the British Columbia Parks and Protected Areas System. The Lieutenant Governor-in-Council created the agency on March 1, 1911, through the Strathcona Park Act. The agency is charged with a dual role of preserving the ecological and historical integrity of the places entrusted to its management, while also making them available and accessible for public use and enjoyment.

== History ==
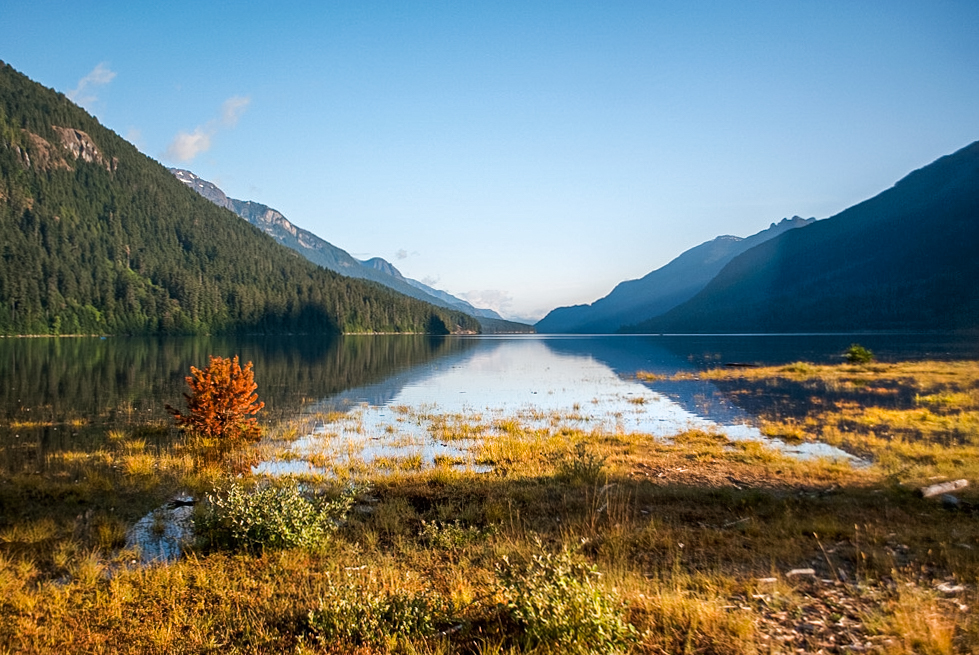
Strathcona Provincial Park, the first provincial park in British Columbia

In July 1910, a party of the British Columbia Provincial Government Expedition led by the Chief Commissioner of Lands Price Ellison explored the region surrounding Crown Mountain on Vancouver Island for the purposes of setting aside land to establish British Columbia's first provincial park. Ellison then reported his findings to the Executive Council of British Columbia.

On March 1, 1911, the executive council passed the Strathcona Park Act, which protected approximately 250,000 hectares (620,000 acres) of mountainous terrain from being sold, settled or otherwise occupied. While the Park Act was intended to protect the land from being exploited, it exempted both mining claims and timber holdings had been granted prior to the establishment of the park from being voided. This statute was further clarified through an amendment made in 1918 that explicitly permitted the "location, acquisition and occupation of mineral claims under the Mineral Act."

The popularity of Glacier and Yoho National Park, both established by the federal government as national parks in 1886, and of municipal parks like Beacon Hill Park (established 1882) and Stanley Park (established 1888), led the government of Richard McBride to adopt the Provincial Parks Act of 1908. The act enabled the provincial government, through the Department of Lands to reserve public lands for the establishment of future parks.

After the federal government's interest in establishing a national park on Vancouver Island became known, the government of McBride amended the Provincial Parks Act to allow the creation of provincial parks by an Order in Council, rather than an act of parliament. And on March 1, 1911, the government of McBride adopted the Strathcona Park Act', which established a 214,451-hectare (529,920-acre) park reserve in the centre of the island named Strathcona Provincial Park. This success encouraged the McBride government to establish a second park reserve, Mount Robson Provincial Park, in 1913.

Following the creation of two more national parks, Mount Revelstoke in 1914 and Kootenay in 1920, the government of John Oliver established John Dean Park from a private land donation in 1921. This was followed by the establishment of two mountaintop parks, Kokanee Glacier and Mount Assiniboine, with the support of the Alpine Club of Canada in 1922.

These early parks were established for recreational purposes, with the larger ones were intended to be developed as major tourist destinations. Their creation did not terminate any existing forestry or mining rights.

In 1924, the provincial government amended the Provincial Parks Act to allow for the reduction in area of established parks, and also to acquire land for parks through land or timber exchanges. Another amendment in 1927 allowed for the rising of water levels within parks.

In addition to several small, local use parks established throughout the 1930s and 1940s, the government of Duff Pattullo created four large parks. Both the Tweedsmuir and Hamber Provincial Parks were over one million hectares when created in 1938 and 1941, respectively, the Wells Gray Provincial Park was established in 1939 at over 470,000 hectares, and the E. C. Manning Provincial Park was created from a wildlife reserve in 1941. The Liard River Provincial Park was a short-lived 730,000-hectare protected area, established in 1944 and cancelled in 1949, though its central feature was included in the 1957, 1,082 hectare Liard River Hot Springs Provincial Park.

=== Social Credit administration (1952–1972) ===
The Social Credit government of W. A. C. Bennett (1952–1972) created hundreds of small parks but reduced the overall size of the park system from 3.6 to 2.9 million hectares to accommodate resource development. While these parks continued the recreational focus of the park system, including the first heritage park with the Barkerville Provincial Park and the first marine parks that have areas for moorage, the new 1965 Park Act inserted conservation as a park objective for the first time and the 1971 Ecological Reserves Act, the result of its participation in the International Biological Program, saw protected areas created solely for the purpose of scientific research and educational purposes.

=== NDP administration (1972–1975) ===
As the New Democratic Party government of Dave Barrett (1972–1975) formed, awareness of environmental issues in the province had been rising for several years and the new government placed an emphasis on land management and preservation. It benefited from the Accelerated Park Development Fund, created in Bennett's last year in power, and a long list of potential parks of mostly mid to large sizes that were not approved by the previous government for various reasons. In its four years, the NDP government had brought the size of the park system up to 4.5 million hectares.

=== Social Credit administration (1976–1991) ===
The next Social Credit governments (1976–1991) returned its focus to small recreation-oriented parks and sought cost-savings through partnerships, though they continued creating ecological reserves and reconciled outstanding mineral and forestry tenures in existing parks. Private service delivery of park services began in the early 1980s, mostly notably in the area of ski hills as private developments within parks, such as Cypress and Seymour, or promoting private developments just outside of parks, like Blackcomb and Mount Washington. Likewise seeking a partnership saving costs, the government agreed to move parks and reserves on Moresby Island into the national park system to create the Gwaii Haanas National Park. Also, during this timeframe the first inland marine park was created with the Shuswap Lake Marine Park and numerous parks (such as Monkman, Sukunka Falls, Gwillim Lake and East Pine) were created to support the government priority of building Tumbler Ridge.

=== NDP administration (1991–2001) ===
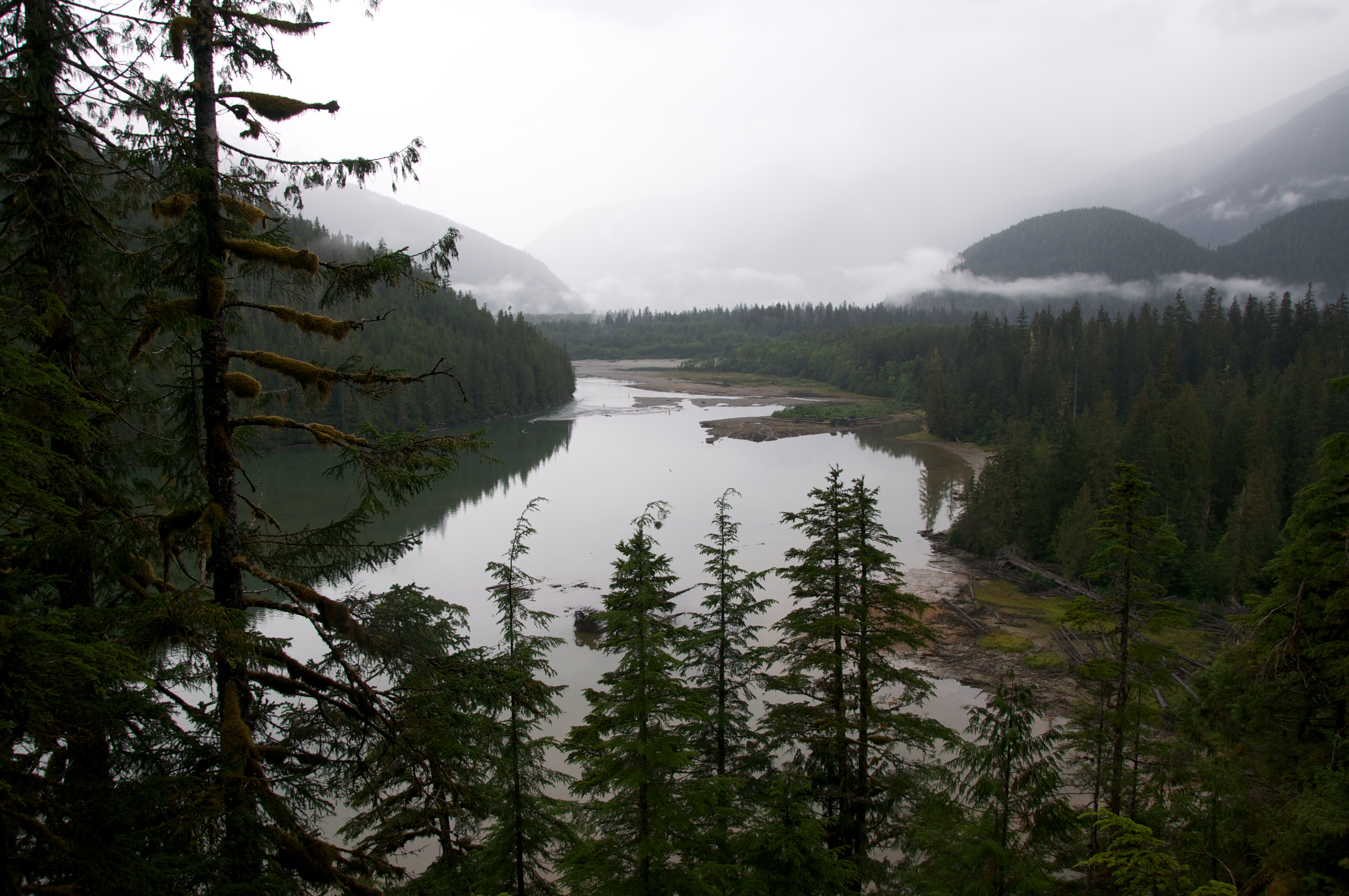
Kitlope Heritage Conservancy was established in 1996 as British Columbia's first conservancy.

Park creation under the next New Democratic Party government (1991–2001) was guided by the federal government's acceptance of the Brundtland Commission's recommendation of preserving 12% of the country in its natural state. To achieve the 12% target, a provincial protected area strategy and regional land use planning was initiated to identify areas and means for resource extraction and for protection. With the addition of suitable areas identified through the resource planning process and numerous very large parks, such as Tatshenshini-Alsek, Tsʼilʔos, Northern Rocky Mountains and Cariboo Mountains, along with the adoption of the Protected Areas of British Columbia Act, the park system doubled in area to 10.9 million hectares (11.6% of the province) in just 10 years.

=== Liberal administration (2001–2017) ===
Park creation halted for the first few years of the Liberal Party government (2001–2017) as it downsized government operations, though they followed through, in 2004, with recommendations of completed land use plans for creating parks in identified areas. The provincial-federal agreement to assemble the Gulf Islands National Park Reserve was continued and resulted in several new provincial parks in the Gulf Islands. The major accomplishment of this era was creation of conservancies in 2006 as protected areas that prioritize biological diversity and First Nations values, rather than recreational values. First Nations had previously been largely excluded from deliberations of park development until the 1997 Supreme Court decision of Delgamuukw v British Columbia after which the provincial government began recognizing Aboriginal title. Also in this era, land trusts became an effective tool to protect privately owned land in a way that did not require its outright purchase and management by the government.

On April 8, 2020, BC Parks announced the full closure of the parks and protected areas system in response to the COVID-19 pandemic. The agency began to selectively reopen parks for day-use only starting on May 14.

== Parks and Protected Areas System ==
Statistics (December 2020)
Designation	Number	Area (ha)
Class A Parks	629	10,544,873
Class B Parks	2	3,778
Class C Parks	13	484
Conservancies	157	3,005,205
Ecological Reserves	148	160,292
Protected Areas	84	384,808
Recreation Areas	2	5,929
Total	1,035	14,105,369

The British Columbia Parks and Protected Areas System is a collection of physical properties managed by BC Parks. The system encompasses 1,035 park units covering an area of about 14.1 million hectares (54,440 mi^{2})—about 14.4% of the entire province—with over 6,000 km (3,700 mi) of hiking trails and approximately 12,700 campsites. It is the third largest park system in North America after the national park systems of Canada and the United States.

The largest park unit is Tweedsmuir South Provincial Park at 989,616 hectares (3,821 mi^{2}). The smallest park unit is Ballingall Islets Ecological Reserve at just 0.2 hectares (0.49 acres).

BC Parks reported attendance of 26,253,500 across all parks and protected areas in 2018–19. Cypress Provincial Park is the most visited park unit, with over 1.8 million visitors in 2017–18.

== Designations ==
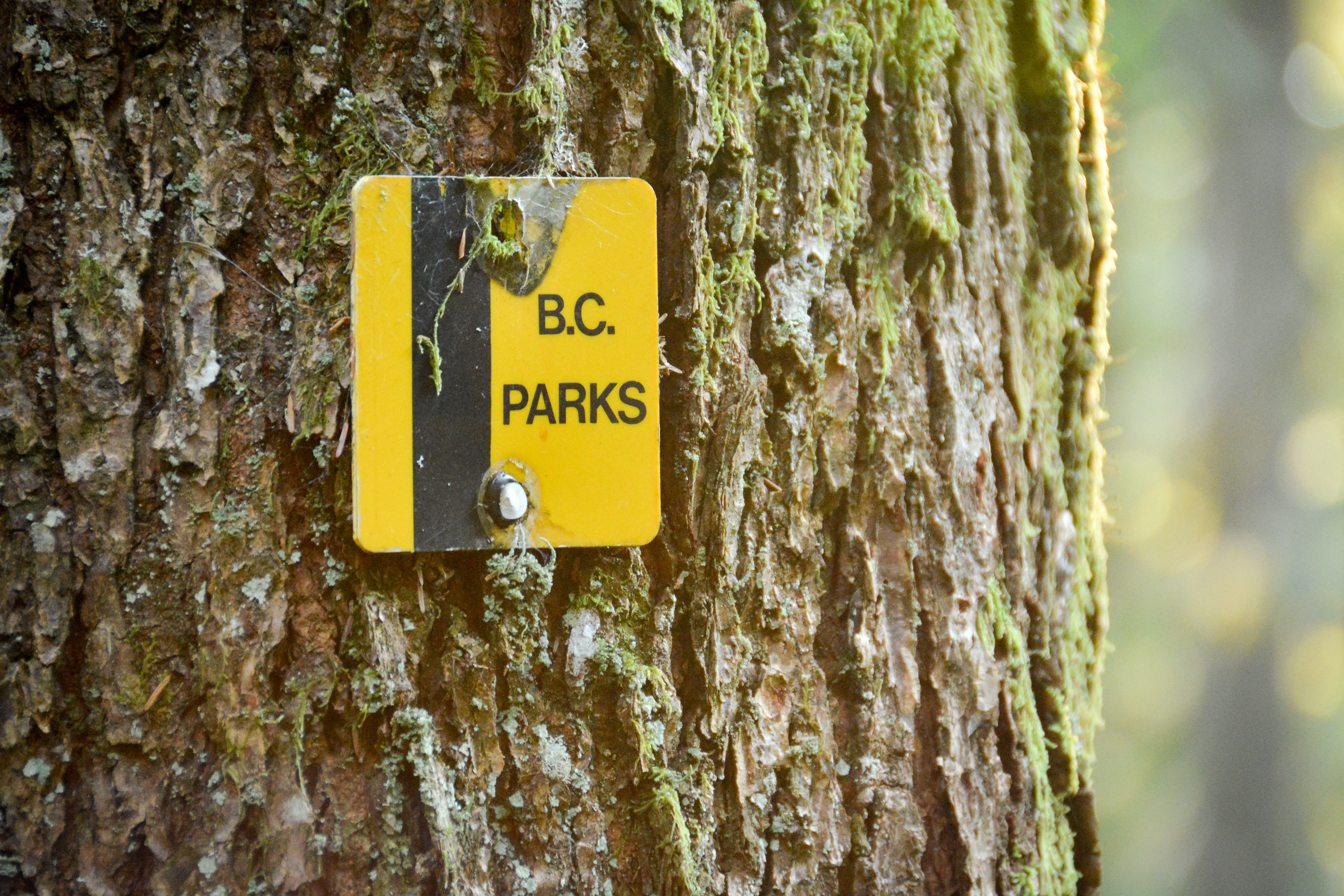
BC Parks trail marker in Golden Ears Provincial Park

The British Columbia Protected Areas System consists of five different designations:

- Provincial Parks: Significant protected Crown lands, divided into three classes:
  - Class A Parks: Lands dedicated to the preservation of their natural environments. Development is generally restricted for recreational facilities only.
  - Class B Parks: Additional activities and uses are permitted, provided that they are not detrimental to recreational values. The only parks with this classification are Sooke Mountain and Strathcona-Westmin.
  - Class C Parks: Managed by a local board, and are generally smaller, providing local recreational amenities.
- Recreation Areas: Lands set aside for recreational use by the public. It is also land that is being evaluated by BC Parks from both a protected area value and an economic opportunity perspective to determine whether the area should be "upgraded" to full protected area status or returned to integrated resource management lands. As of December 2020, there are only two recreation areas: Coquihalla Summit and Kettle River.
- Conservancies: Lands that are protected and maintained for biological diversity, natural environments, and recreational values. These lands are also explicitly recognized for social, ceremonial and cultural uses of First Nations.
- Protected Areas: A natural area that generally has existing or proposed activities that are normally restricted from a provincial park, such as an industrial road, pipeline, transmission line, or communications site.
- Ecological Reserves: An area reserved for its ecological importance, and providing suitable scientific research and educational purposes, representative examples of natural ecosystems or ecological recovery from human activity, habitat for rare or endangered native plants and animals, and/or unique and rare examples of botanical, zoological or geological phenomena.

The BC Parks and Protected Areas System also features two sub-designations:

- Marine Provincial Parks: Waters dedicated to the preservation of their natural environments and recreational value.
- Historic Provincial Parks: Lands dedicated to the preservation of their historic significance to the province. Since the adoption of the Heritage Conservation Act in 1998, these parks have been gradually re-designated as "Provincial heritage properties" and placed under local administration. As of December 2020, only two Historic Provincial Parks remain: Morden Colliery and Seton Portage.

== See also ==
- Alberta Parks
- Washington State Park System
