= Amor Lake =

Lake in British Columbia, Canada

- Location within Vancouver Island
- Location: Vancouver Island, British Columbia
- Coordinates: 50°09′39″N 125°33′10″W
- Lake type: Natural lake
- Basin countries: Canada
- Surface area: 317.6 ha (785 acres)

Amor Lake is a lake on Vancouver Island at the head of Amor De Cosmos Creek and northwest of the city of Campbell River. It covers an estimated area of 317.6 ha (785 acres).

== See also ==
- List of lakes of British Columbia
