= Brewster Lake =

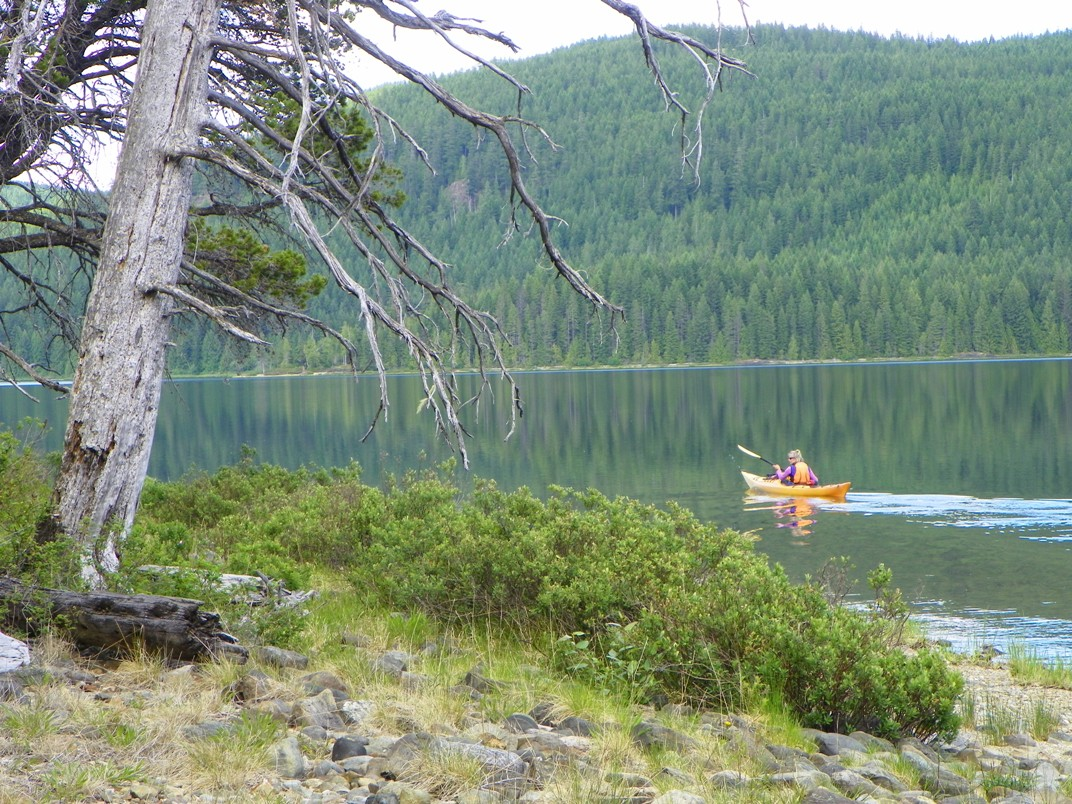

- Location within Vancouver Island
- Location: Vancouver Island, British Columbia
- Coordinates: 50°06′00″N 125°35′00″W
- Lake type: Natural lake
- Catchment area: 5 km^{2} (1.9 sq mi)
- Basin countries: Canada

Brewster Lake is a lake on Vancouver Island northwest of Campbell Lake and north west of the city Campbell River.

Brewster lake is a part of a chain of lakes within the Sayward Forest Canoe Route. One of three largest lakes on the route, Brewst paddle with a 0.3 km portage at the most southern tip to Gray Lake and a 2.3 km portage at the most northern shores to Surprise Lake. Brewster is well known for its year round good fishing for cutthroat and rainbow trout and Dolly Varden.

== See also ==
- List of lakes of British Columbia
