= Campbell River (Vancouver Island) =

River in British Columbia, Canada

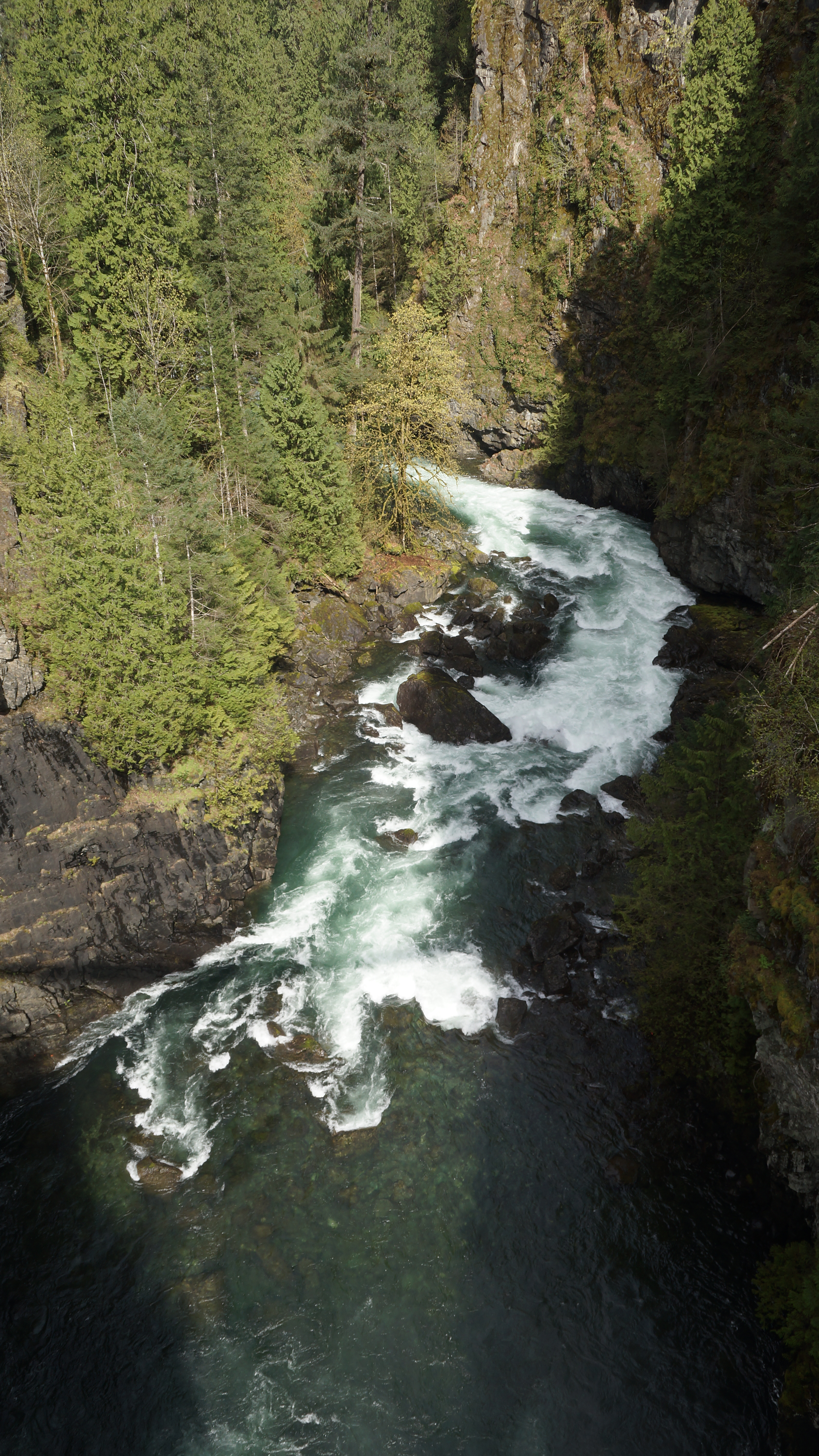
- Campbell River downstream of Elk Falls in the Elk Canyon as seen from suspension bridge in Elk Falls Provincial Park

- Location within Vancouver Island
- Native name: Tla'mataxw (Kwak'wala)

Physical characteristics
- Mouth
  - coordinates: 50°02′30″N 125°15′25″W
- Discharge
  - location: Campbell River

Basin features
- Waterfalls: Elk Falls

The Campbell River is a river on Vancouver Island, British Columbia, Canada. It drains into Discovery Passage at the northwest end of the Strait of Georgia at the City of Campbell River. The Kwak'wala name for the river, or for the village near its mouth, at Campbell River Indian Reserve No. 11, is Tla'mataxw. The source of the river is Buttle Lake.

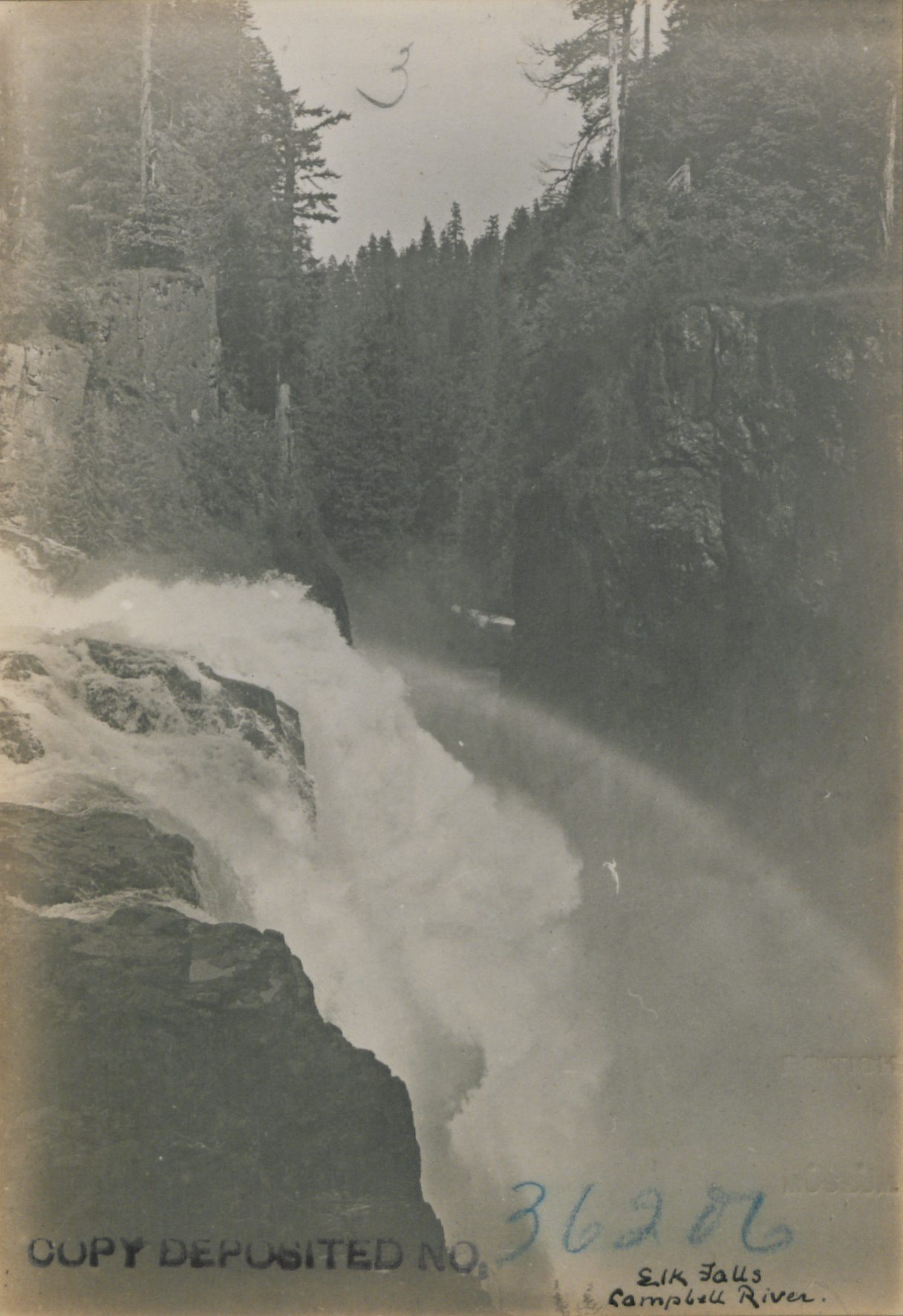
Campbell River flowing over Elk Falls, 1919

== Name origin ==
The river was named for Dr. Samuel Campbell, ship's surgeon aboard HMS Plumper from 1857 to 1861. Campbell Bay on Mayne Island and Samuel Island were also named for him, as may also have been Campbell Point on Loughborough Inlet and Campbell Island, the location of the community of Bella Bella, and Plumper's Cove on Keats Island.

== Hydroelectricity ==
Three hydroelectric dams are located on the Campbell River: the John Hart Dam, finished in 1947, which impounds John Hart Lake; upstream, the Ladore Dam, completed in 1949 on Lower Campbell Lake; and the Strathcona Dam, completed 1958, impounding Upper Campbell Lake furthest upstream. Each dam has an accompanying generating station, of which the John Hart Generating Station near the John Hart Dam is the largest. Combined, the three generating stations account for about 11 percent of Vancouver Island's total electricity supply. Due to seismic concerns from the age of the generating stations, the John Hart generating station underwent upgrades spanning 2014 to 2019.

== See also ==
- List of rivers of British Columbia
