= Buttle Lake =

Lake in British Columbia, Canada

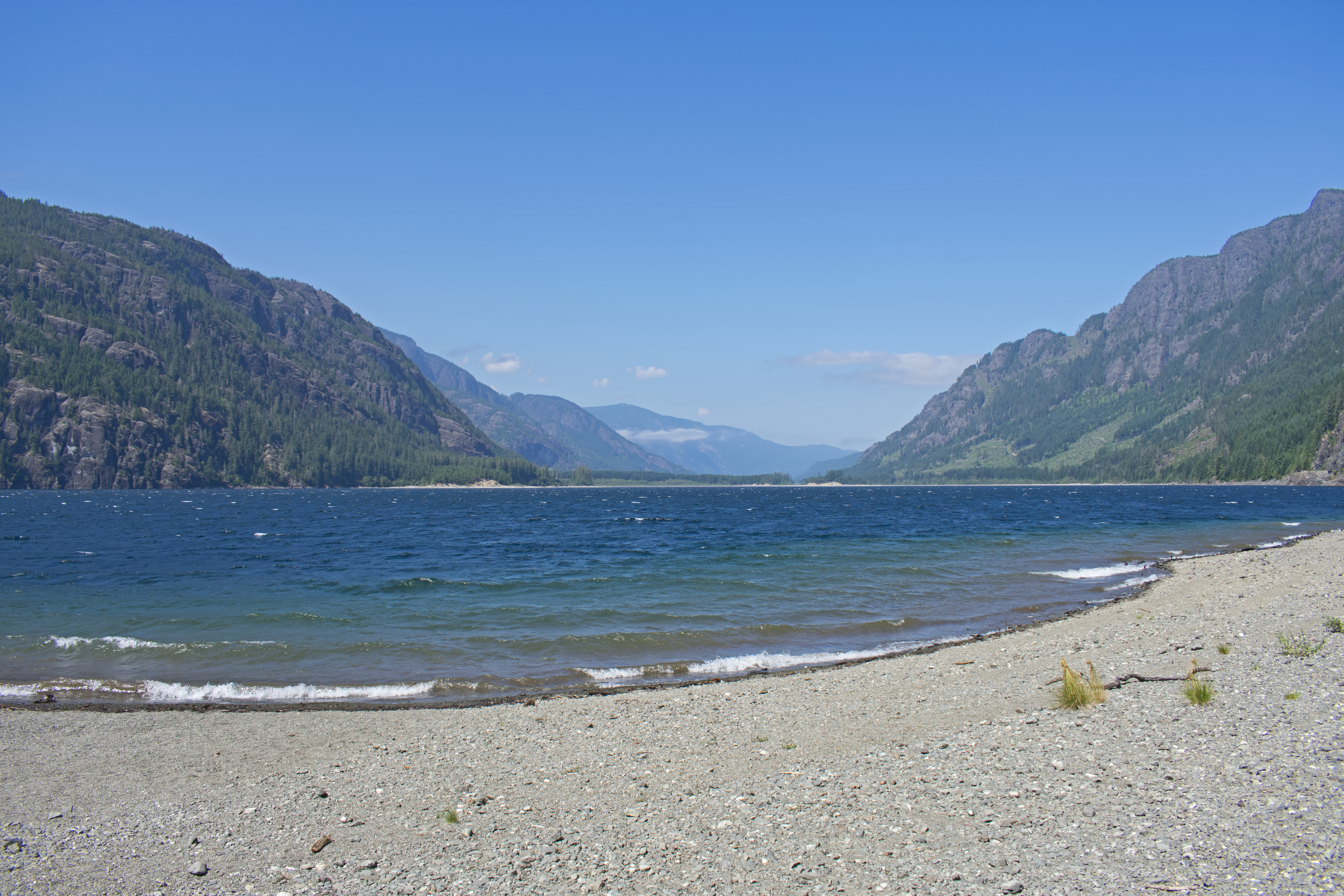
- Buttle Lake from below the Lupin Falls trail

- Location within Vancouver Island
- Location: Vancouver Island, British Columbia
- Coordinates: 49°40′59″N 125°32′59″W
- Lake type: Reservoir
- Primary inflows: Ralph River, Thelwood Creek, Wolf River
- Primary outflows: Campbell River
- Basin countries: Canada
- First flooded: 1958
- Max. length: 23 km (14 mi)
- Max. width: 1.5 km (0.93 mi)
- Surface area: 28 km^{2} (11 sq mi)
- Max. depth: 120 m (390 ft)
- Surface elevation: 221 m (725 ft)

Buttle Lake is a lake on Vancouver Island in Strathcona Regional District, British Columbia, Canada. It is about 23 kilometres (14 mi) long and 1.5 kilometres (0.9 mi) wide, has an area of 28 square kilometres (11 sq mi), is up to 120 metres (394 ft) deep, and lies at an elevation of 221 metres (725 ft). The lake is located between Campbell River and Gold River in Strathcona Provincial Park. The lake is the headwaters of the Campbell River.

== History ==
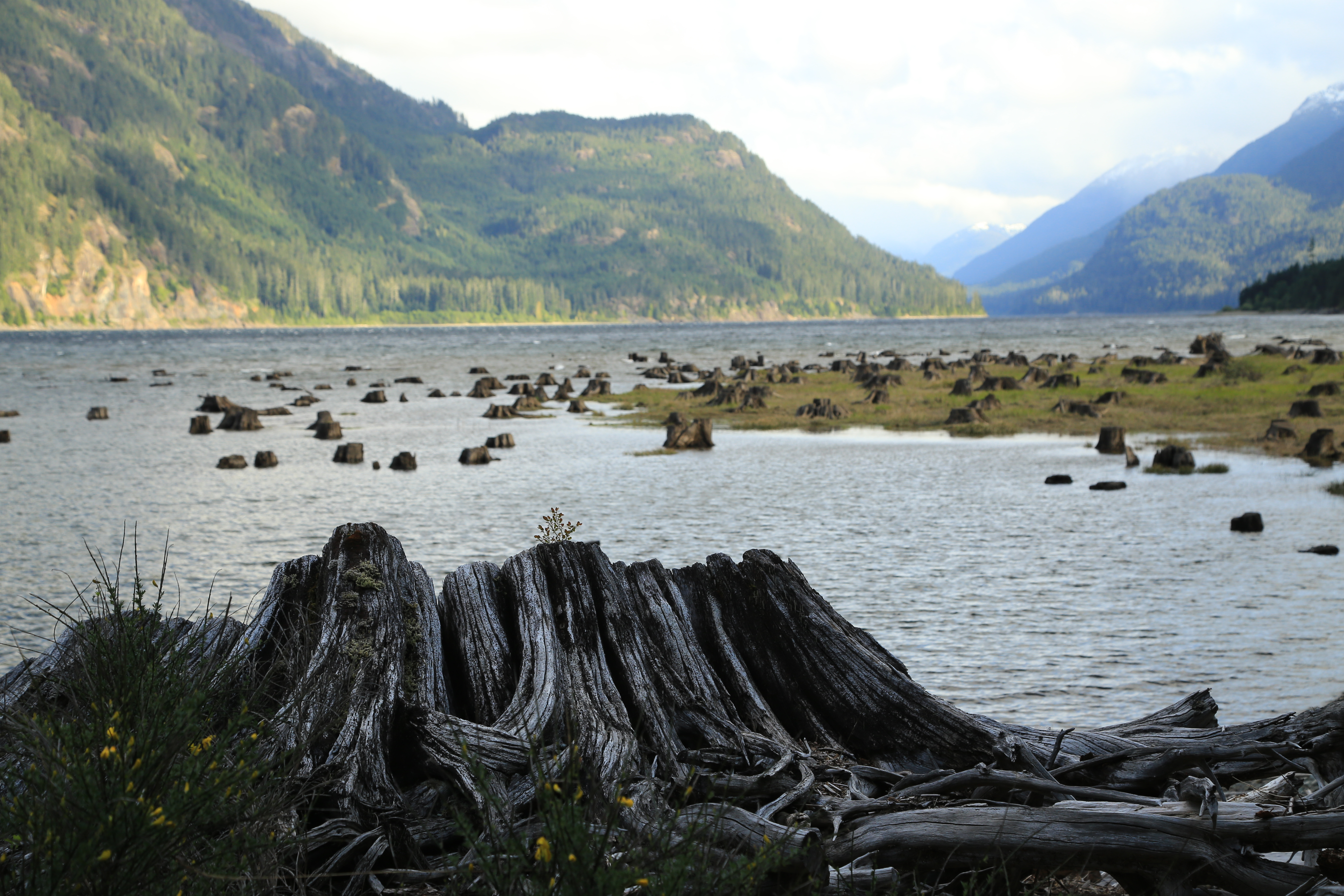
Stumps visible at low water level

The lake was named after John Buttle, geologist and botanist from Kew Gardens, London, who came to the area with the Royal Engineers. They mapped the area around the lake in 1865. Buttle explored Vancouver Island as a naturalist under Dr Robert Brown as part of the Vancouver Island Exploring Expedition in 1864. He discovered and mapped the lake the next year.

During 1955–1958, the Strathcona Dam was built on Upper Campbell Lake, raising the water level by 30 metres (98 ft). The raised water level coalesced Upper Campbell and Buttle Lake, raising the level of Buttle by 5 meters. Prior to the increase, 600 hectares (1,500 acres) of forest at low-lying areas along the shore was harvested, and in many areas not fully cleared. At times of low water, there exist mudflats with stumps remaining from the forests that formerly stood there.

== Travel and activities ==
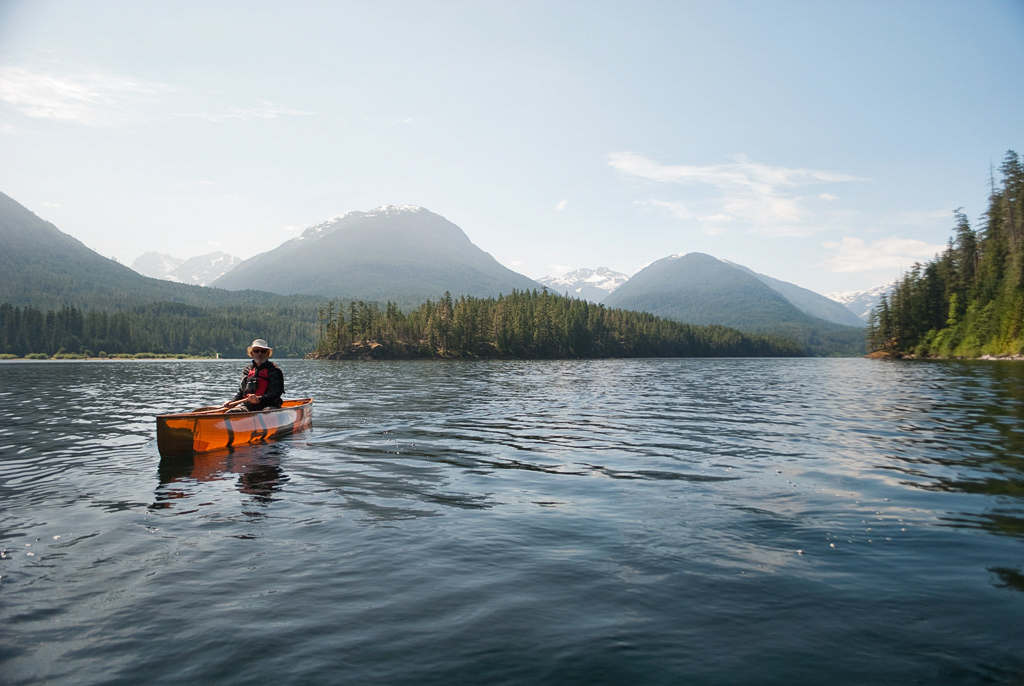
Canoeing on Buttle Lake

The lake is accessed via Strathcona Provincial Park which is located almost in the center of Vancouver Island. The main access to the park is via Highway 28, which connects with Gold River on the west coast of Vancouver Island. Highway 28 passes through the northern section of the park and provides access to Buttle Lake.

There are multiple campgrounds along Buttle Lake. Hiking, swimming, boating, fishing and bicycling are common activities in the area.

== See also ==
- List of lakes of British Columbia
