= Mount George V =

Mountain in Canada

- Location within Vancouver Island Location within British Columbia
- Interactive map of Mount George V

Highest point
- Elevation: 1,884 m (6,181 ft)
- Prominence: 101 m (331 ft)
- Parent peak: Clarence Peak (1931 m)
- Listing: Mountains of British Columbia
- Coordinates: 49°38′57″N 125°25′27″W

Geography
- Location: Vancouver Island, British Columbia, Canada
- District: Comox Land District
- Parent range: Vancouver Island Ranges
- Topo map: NTS 92F11 Forbidden Plateau

Climbing
- First ascent: 1930s (?)

Mount George V is a mountain located in Strathcona Provincial Park on Vancouver Island in British Columbia. This peak is located 3.2 km (2 mi) south of Mount Albert Edward. Mount Frink and Castlecrag Mountain are within 2 km (1 mi) to the northeast. Its first ascent may have been by surveyors in the 1930s.

The mountain was named in 1935 for George V in recognition of his Silver jubilee.

== See also ==
- Royal eponyms in Canada
