= Mount Regan (British Columbia) =

Mountain in British Columbia, Canada

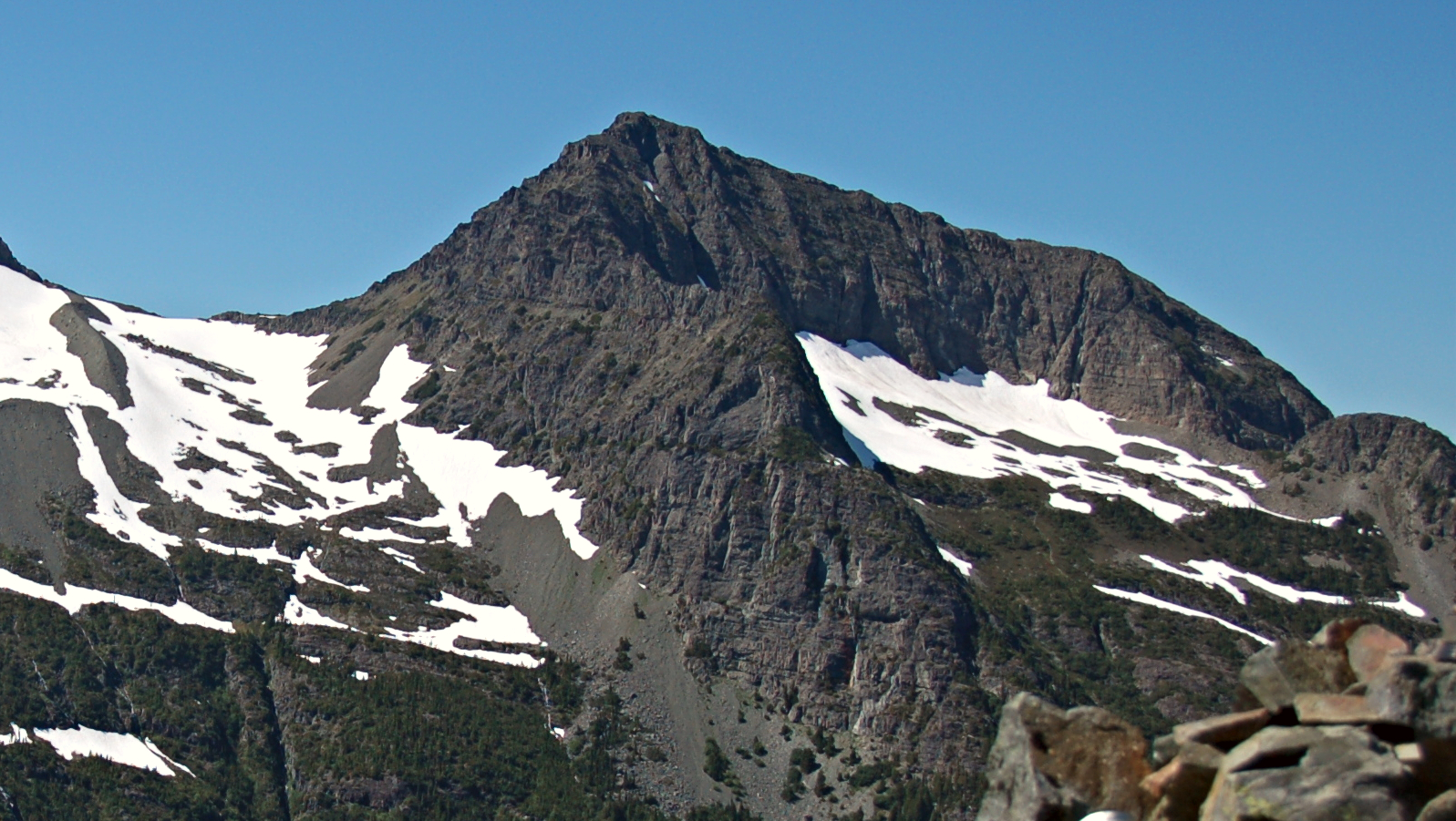
- Mount Regan, east aspect

Highest point
- Elevation: 1,976 m (6,483 ft)
- Prominence: 162 m (531 ft)
- Coordinates: 49°41′06.0″N 125°25′55.0″W

Geography
- Location within Vancouver Island Location within British Columbia Location within Canada
- Interactive map of Mount Regan
- Location: Vancouver Island, British Columbia, Canada
- District: Comox Land District
- Parent range: Vancouver Island Ranges
- Topo map: NTS 92F11 Forbidden Plateau

Mount Regan is a mountain on Vancouver Island, British Columbia, Canada, located 32 km (20 mi) west of Courtenay and 1 km (1 mi) north of Mount Albert Edward. It is associated with the Vancouver Island Ranges, the southernmost extent of the Insular Mountains.

== Climate ==
Based on the Köppen climate classification, Mt. Regan is located in the marine west coast climate zone of western North America. Most weather fronts originate in the Pacific Ocean, and travel east toward Vancouver Island where they are forced upward by the ranges (Orographic lift), causing them to drop their moisture in the form of rain or snowfall. As a result, the mountains experience high precipitation, especially during the winter months in the form of snowfall. Temperatures can drop below −20 °C with wind chill factors below −30 °C. The months July through September offer the most favorable weather for climbing Regan.

== See also ==
- List of mountains of Canada
- Geography of British Columbia
- Geology of British Columbia
