= Castlecrag Mountain =

Mountain in British Columbia, Canada

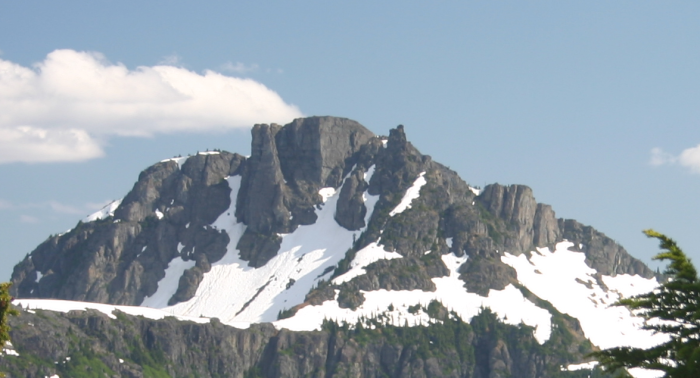

Highest point
- Elevation: 1,765 m (5,791 ft)
- Prominence: 123 m (404 ft)
- Coordinates: 49°39′45″N 125°23′13″W

Geography
- Location within Vancouver Island Location within British Columbia
- Interactive map of Castlecrag Mountain
- Location: Vancouver Island, British Columbia, Canada
- District: Comox Land District
- Parent range: Vancouver Island Ranges
- Topo map: NTS 92F11 Forbidden Plateau

Castlecrag Mountain is a mountain located on Vancouver Island, British Columbia. Castlecrag Mountain is located South of Moat Lake, 1.6 km West of Mount Frink along the same ridge line.

Castlecrag Mountain is often climbed as part of the Castlecrag - Mt. Frink loop. This route starts at Circlet Lake, accessed from Paradise Meadows and the Mount Washington Alpine Resort.

== History ==
The name Castlecrag Mountain comes from the appearance of the North aspect. The Geographic Board of the BC Geographic Names Office deemed Castle Crag too obscure, instead adopting Castlecrag Mountain in 1948.

== See also ==
- List of mountains in Strathcona Provincial Park
