= Mount Mitchell (British Columbia) =

Mountain in British Columbia, Canada

- Location within Vancouver Island Location within British Columbia
- Interactive map of Mount Mitchell

Highest point
- Elevation: 1,842 m (6,043 ft)
- Prominence: 310 m (1,020 ft)
- Coordinates: 49°41′17.2″N 125°27′47.9″W

Geography
- Location: Vancouver Island, British Columbia, Canada
- District: Comox Land District
- Parent range: Vancouver Island Ranges
- Topo map: NTS 92F11 Forbidden Plateau

Mount Mitchell is a mountain on Vancouver Island, British Columbia, Canada, located 34 km (21 mi) west of Courtenay and 3 km (2 mi) northwest of Mount Albert Edward.

== See also ==
- List of mountains of Canada
