= The Red Pillar =

Mountain in British Columbia, Canada

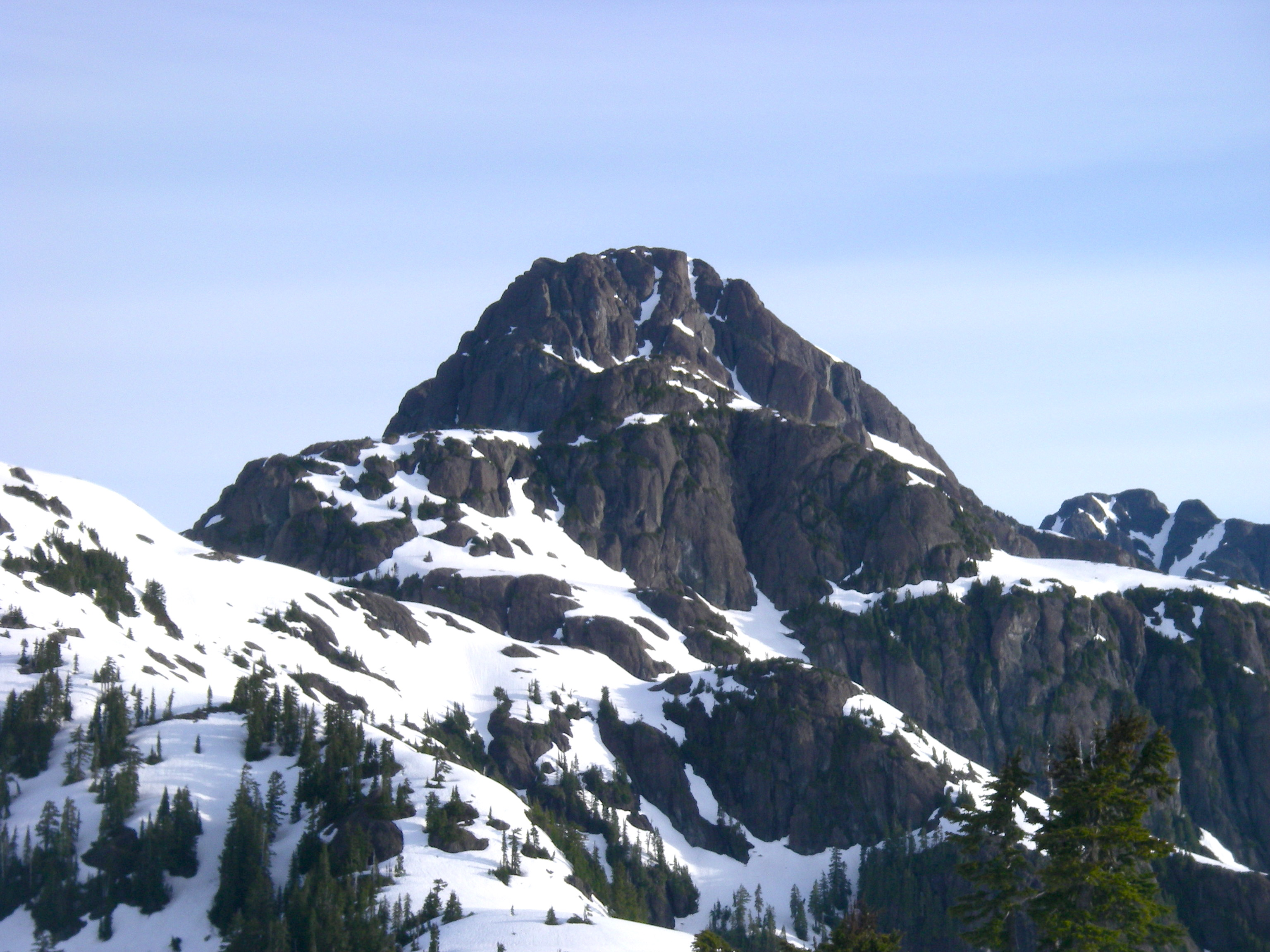

Highest point
- Elevation: 2,034 m (6,673 ft)
- Prominence: 571 m (1,873 ft)
- Coordinates: 49°31′32.2″N 125°23′21.1″W

Geography
- Location within Vancouver Island Location within British Columbia
- Interactive map of The Red Pillar
- Location: Vancouver Island, British Columbia, Canada
- District: Clayoquot Land District
- Parent range: Vancouver Island Ranges
- Topo map: NTS 92F11 Forbidden Plateau

The Red Pillar is a mountain on Vancouver Island, British Columbia, Canada, located 33 km (21 mi) southwest of Courtenay and 17 km (11 mi) south of Mount Albert Edward.

The Red Pillar is a member of the Vancouver Island Ranges which in turn form part of the Insular Mountains.

== History ==
The Red Pillar's name is descriptive, according to the BC Geographical Names Information System:

The mountain was climbed in 1931 by local climbers Geoff Capes and Jack Gregson; they left a note in a cairn at the summit naming it "The Pillar". (Ruth Masters, Comox & District Mountaineering Club)

"...the highest peak in the glacier region, which was first climbed on August 1, 1931. The party of which I was one, did not wish to call the peak after one of our number so left the request in the cairn we erected that is should be called "The Pillar." There are many other Pillars so may I suggest that it be called The Red Pillar as it is of distinctly reddish rock." (July 1935 letter from Ben Hughes, publisher, Comox Argus)

== Access ==
The easiest access to The Red Pillar is from the south, via the Ash River Trail. The trail starts at the north-west end of Oshinow Lake. There are two ways to reach the trail head:

1. Paddle the length of Oshinow Lake starting from the launch at the south-east end.
2. Hike the overgrown and washed-out logging branch, 110H, along the east side of Oshinow Lake.

Alternatively, The Red Pillar can be accessed from the Comox Glacier by traversing over, or going around, Argus Mountain.

== See also ==
- List of mountains in Strathcona Provincial Park
- List of mountains of British Columbia
