= Amphitheatre (disambiguation) =

An amphitheatre is an open-air venue used for entertainment, performances, and sports.

Amphitheatre or Amphitheater may also refer to:

== Australia ==
- Amphitheatre, New South Wales, a civil parish
- Amphitheatre, Victoria, a town
- The Amphitheatre, a geographical feature in Hallett Cove Conservation Park, South Australia

== Other places ==
- Amphitheatre (Drakensberg), a geographical feature in Northern Drakensberg, South Africa
- Amphitheatre (London), the remains of a Roman amphitheatre in London, England
- The Amphitheatre, a basin in Graham Land, Antarctica
- The Amphitheatre (Victoria Land), a great cirque in Victoria Land, Antarctica

== See also ==
- Anatomical theatre a tiered educational space for dissecting cadavers
- Operating theatre (formerly) a tiered educational space for performing surgery
- Amphitheatre Lake (disambiguation)
- Amphitheater Mountain (disambiguation)
- Category:Amphitheaters
- List of contemporary amphitheatres
