= Jutland Mountain =

Mountain in British Columbia, Canada

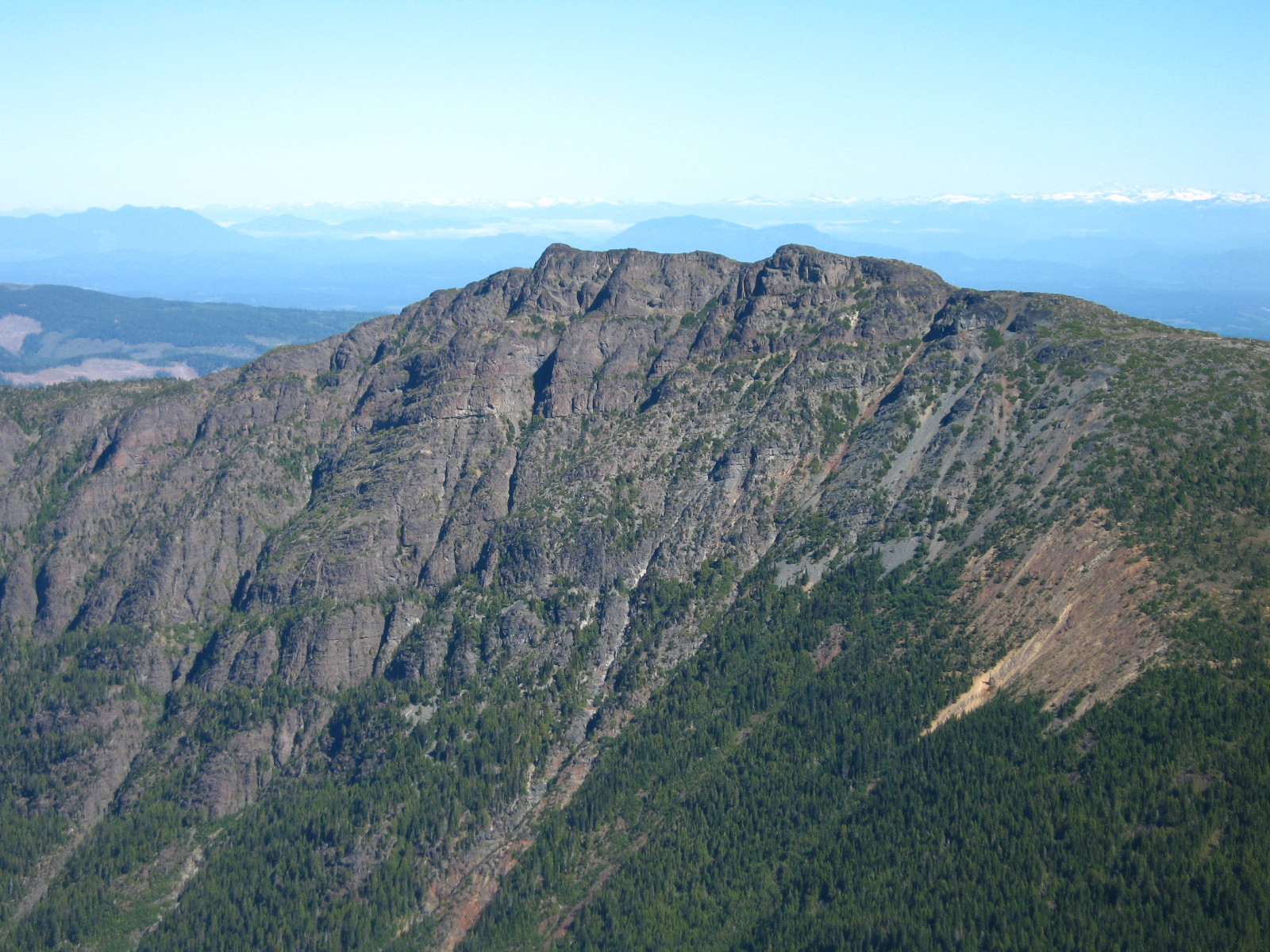
- Jutland Mountain from the south

Highest point
- Elevation: 1,821 m (5,974 ft)
- Prominence: 223 m (732 ft)
- Coordinates: 49°42′06.8″N 125°24′51.8″W

Geography
- Location within Vancouver Island Location within British Columbia
- Interactive map of Jutland Mountain
- Location: Vancouver Island, British Columbia, Canada
- District: Clayoquot Land District
- Parent range: Vancouver Island Ranges
- Topo map: NTS 92F11 Forbidden Plateau

Jutland Mountain is a mountain on Vancouver Island, British Columbia, Canada, located 30 km (19 mi) west of Courtenay and 3 km (2 mi) northeast of Mount Albert Edward.

== See also ==
- List of mountains in Canada
