= Panther Lake =

Panther Lake may refer to:

- Panther Lake (Herkimer County, New York), a small lake east-southeast of Old Forge
- Panther Lake (Orange County, Florida), a natural freshwater lake on the north side of Walt Disney World
- Panther Lake (Oswego County, New York), a private lake near the hamlet of Panther Lake
- Panther Lake (Vancouver Island), a lake on Forbidden Plateau, British Columbia
- Panther Lake, a hamlet in Constantia, New York
- Panther Lake (microprocessor), an Intel CPU microarchitecture
