= Mount Tom Taylor =

Mountain in British Columbia, Canada

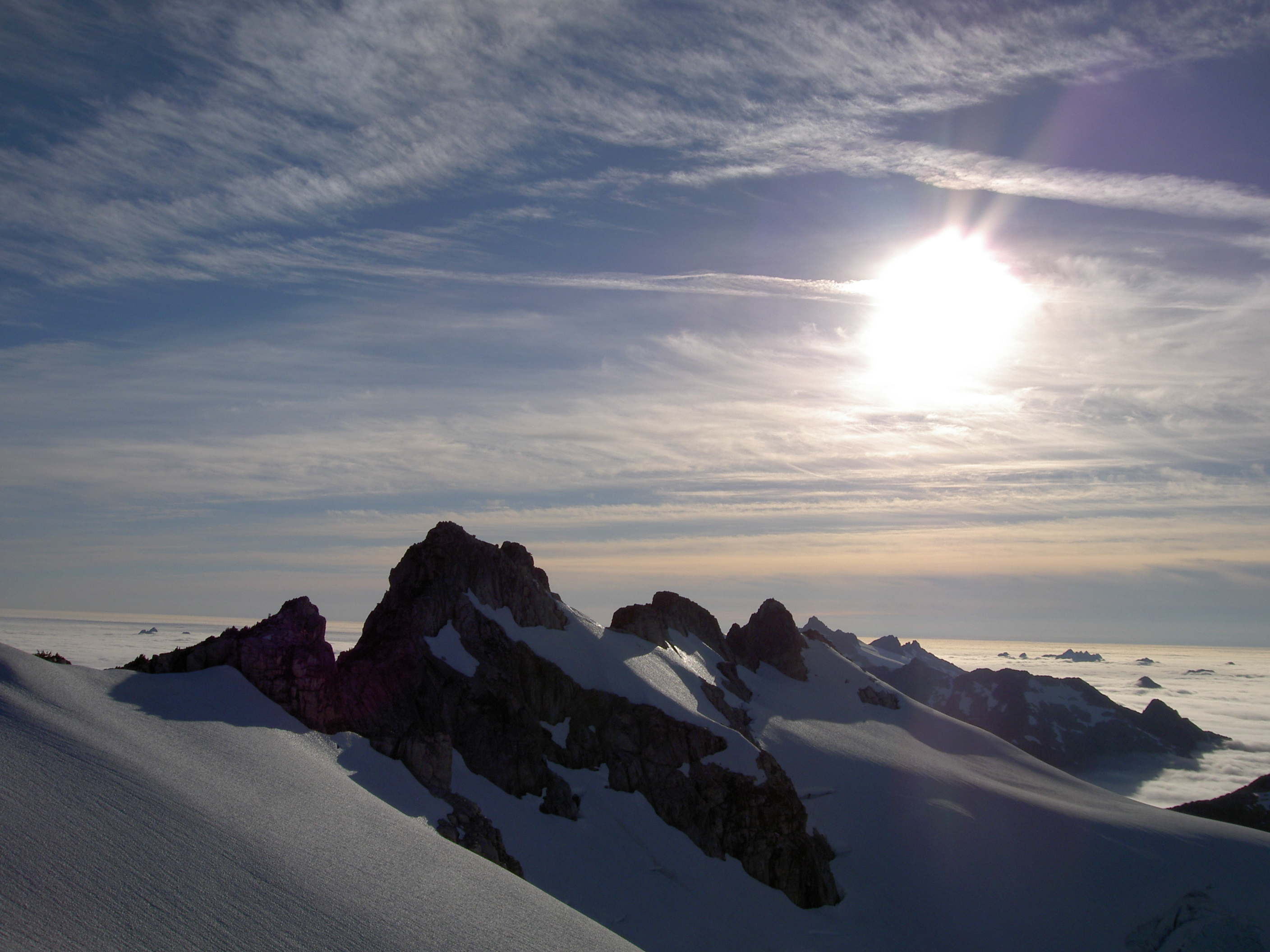
- Summit ridge of Mount Tom Taylor

Highest point
- Elevation: 1,789 m (5,869 ft)
- Prominence: 828 m (2,717 ft)
- Coordinates: 49°28′39.0″N 125°38′16.0″W

Geography
- Location within Vancouver Island Location within British Columbia
- Interactive map of Mount Tom Taylor
- Location: Vancouver Island, British Columbia, Canada
- District: Clayoquot Land District
- Parent range: Vancouver Island Ranges
- Topo map: NTS 92F5 Bedwell River

Mount Tom Taylor is a mountain on Vancouver Island, British Columbia, Canada, located 41 km (25 mi) northeast of Tofino and 27 km (17 mi) southwest of Mount Albert Edward. This mountain is composed of granite, which is nearly unique in Strathcona Provincial Park. Several multi-pitch alpine climbing routes have been established on its steep SE flanks.

== History ==
Mount Tom Taylor is named in honor of a politician involved in the development of Strathcona Provincial Park:

Named after the Honorable Thomas Taylor (1865 - 1947), who, as minister of Public Works, had been instrumental in securing government funds for the survey & construction of roads and general development of Strathcona Park: "The Hon. Thomas Taylor... intends to spare no pains to secure through here the finest drives to be found anywhere, and... Sir Richard McBride is very desirous that the park be developed to its utmost...." (The Great Playground on Vancouver Island, British Columbia Magazine, Vol 9, No 7, July 1913, p. 370.) The onset of World War I, and a shortage of government funds brought the elaborate development plans to a halt. Prior to assuming a cabinet post, Taylor listed his profession as mineral broker, then mining recorder. He served as Minister of Works [Public Works] December 1908 – December 1915, and held a dual portfolio as Minister of Railways March 1911 – December 1915.

== Access ==
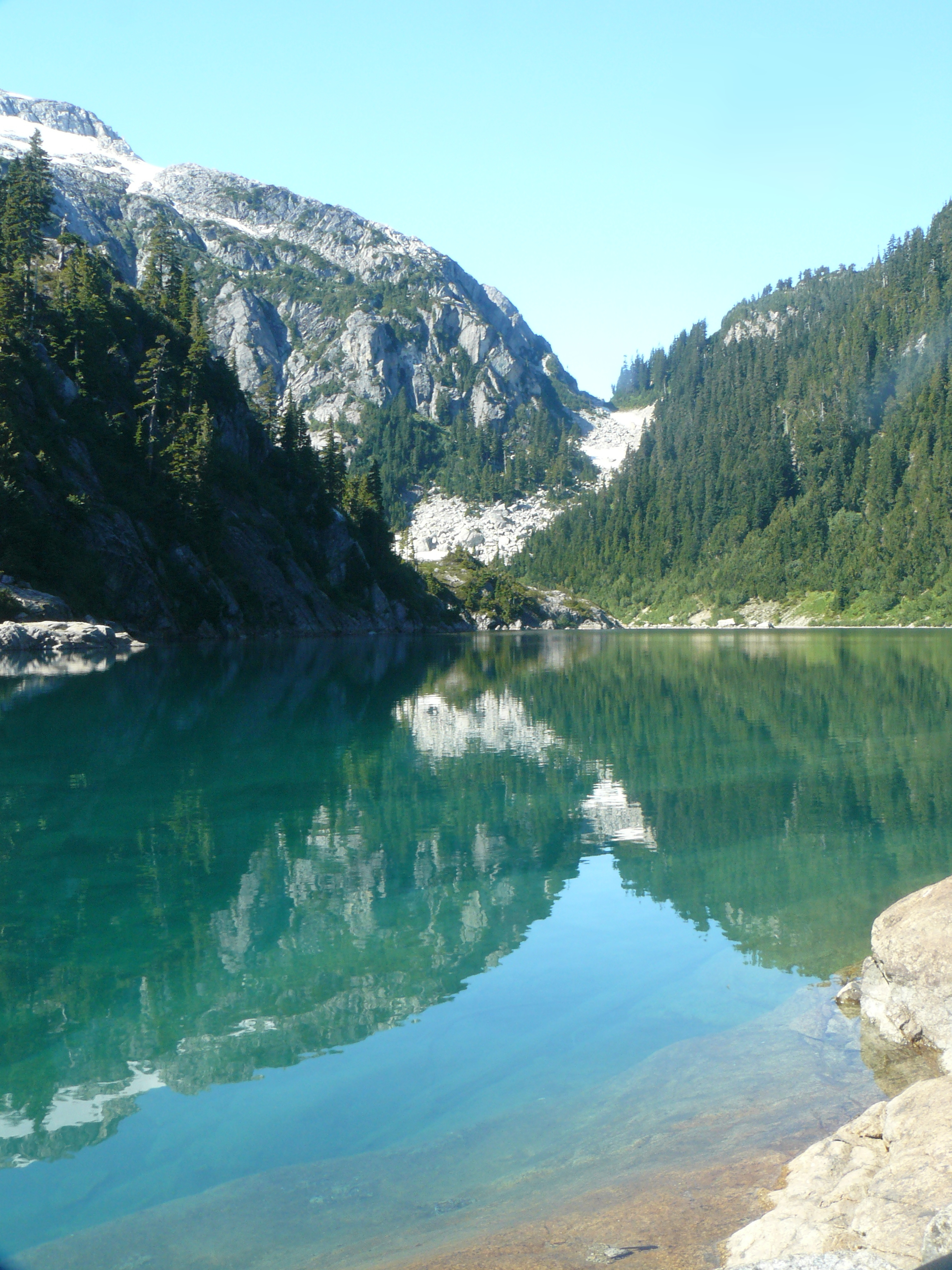
The unnamed lake NE of Mount Tom Taylor that the access trail reaches

Mount Tom Taylor is frequently accessed from Bedwell Lake and the Bedwell Lake Trail. A trail starts between Baby Bedwell Lake and Bedwell Lake, in a sharp bend in the Bedwell Lake Trail. The trail heads west, then south, roughly following the edge of Bedwell Lake. It climbs steeply to meet Mount Tom Taylor's NE ridge at an unnamed lake.

== See also ==
- List of mountains in Canada
- List of mountains in Strathcona Provincial Park
