= Mount Frink =

Mountain in the country of Canada

- Location within Vancouver Island Location within British Columbia
- Interactive map of Mount Frink

Highest point
- Elevation: 1,950 m (6,400 ft)
- Prominence: 130 m (430 ft)
- Coordinates: 49°39′48″N 125°24′31″W

Geography
- Location: Vancouver Island, British Columbia, Canada
- District: Comox Land District
- Parent range: Vancouver Island Ranges
- Topo map: NTS 92F11 Forbidden Plateau

Mount Frink is a plateau-like mesa on Vancouver Island, British Columbia, Canada, located 30 km (19 mi) west of Courtenay and 2 km (1 mi) southeast of Mount Albert Edward Most often Frink is climbed as part of a traverse, circumnavigating the high ridge that wraps around Moat Lake from Castlecraig Mountain to Mt. Albert Edward.

Beyond tagging the summit via the ridge traverse, the only other noteworthy route is the West face which had its first recorded ascent done in the winter of 1999/2000 over New Years by Alex and Dave Ratson. Graded at AI III (AI= Alpine ice) with a few mixed moves in the lower portion of the route.

== See also ==
- List of mountains of Canada
