= Republic Mountain =

Mountain in the American state of Wyoming

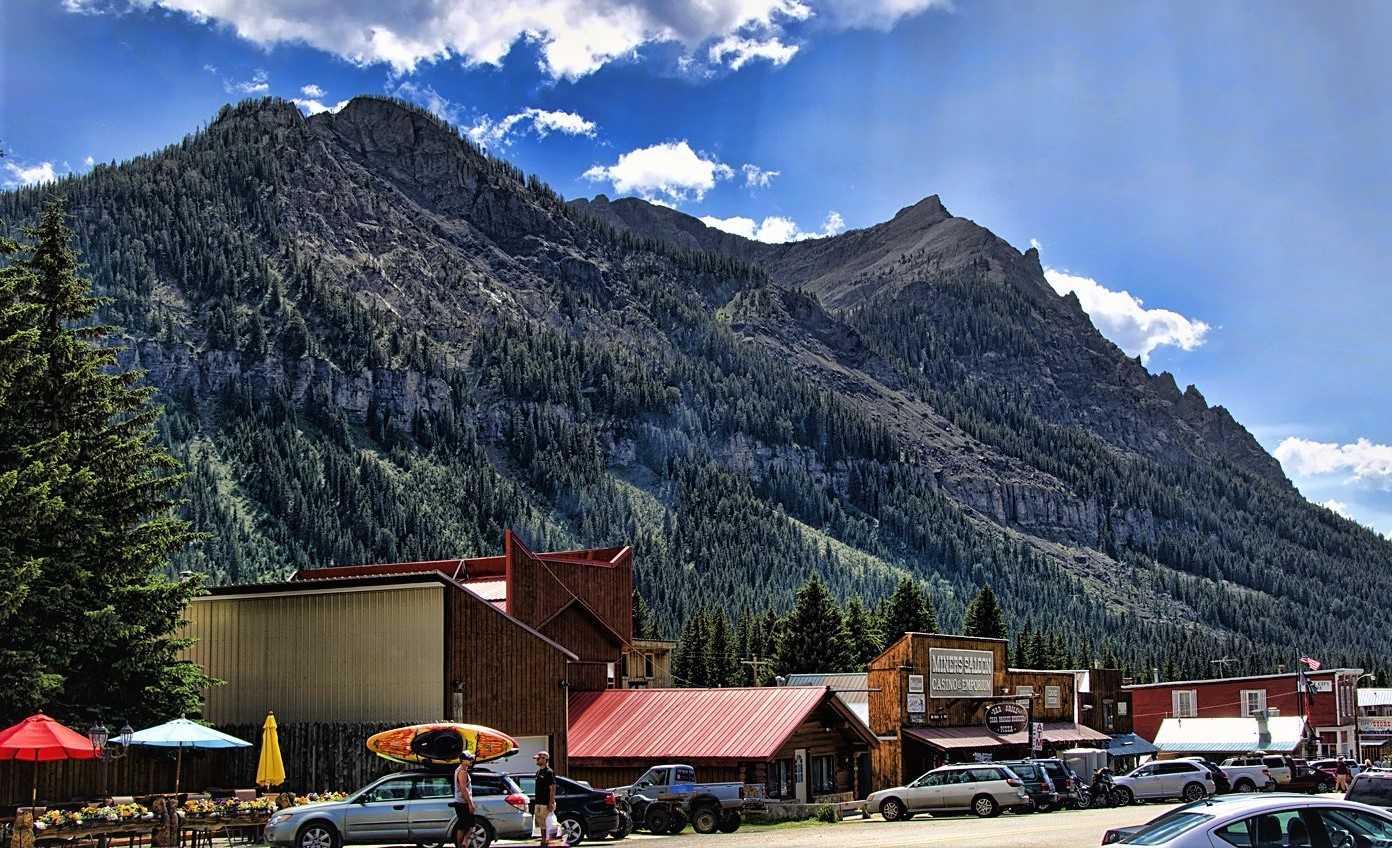
- Northeast aspect, from Cooke City

Highest point
- Elevation: 10,162 ft (3,097 m)
- Prominence: 882 ft (269 m)
- Parent peak: Amphitheater Mountain (11,042 ft)
- Isolation: 2.09 mi (3.36 km)
- Coordinates: 45°00′04″N 109°57′17″W

Geography
- Location within Wyoming Location within the United States
- Location: Park County, Wyoming, U.S.
- Parent range: Absaroka Range; Rocky Mountains
- Topo map: USGS Cooke City

Republic Mountain is a 10,162-foot-elevation (3,097-meter) mountain summit located in Park County, Wyoming, United States.

== Description ==
The peak is situated approximately one mile southwest of the town of Cooke City, Montana, just outside the northeast corner of Yellowstone National Park. It is part of the Absaroka Range, and is within the North Absaroka Wilderness, on land managed by Shoshone National Forest. Topographic relief is significant as the north aspect rises over 2,600 feet (790 meters) above Cooke City in one mile. The nearest higher neighbor is Amphitheater Mountain, 2.5 miles to the southwest, and Pilot Peak is four miles to the southeast. The mountain's name was officially adopted as Republic Peak in 1930 by the United States Board on Geographic Names, and officially changed to Republic Mountain by the board in 1959.

== Climate ==
According to the Köppen climate classification system, Republic Mountain is located in a subarctic climate zone with long, cold, snowy winters, and cool to warm summers. Winter temperatures can drop below −10 °F with wind chill factors below −30 °F. Precipitation runoff from the mountain drains into Republic Creek and Soda Butte Creek, which are tributaries of the Lamar River.

== Gallery ==
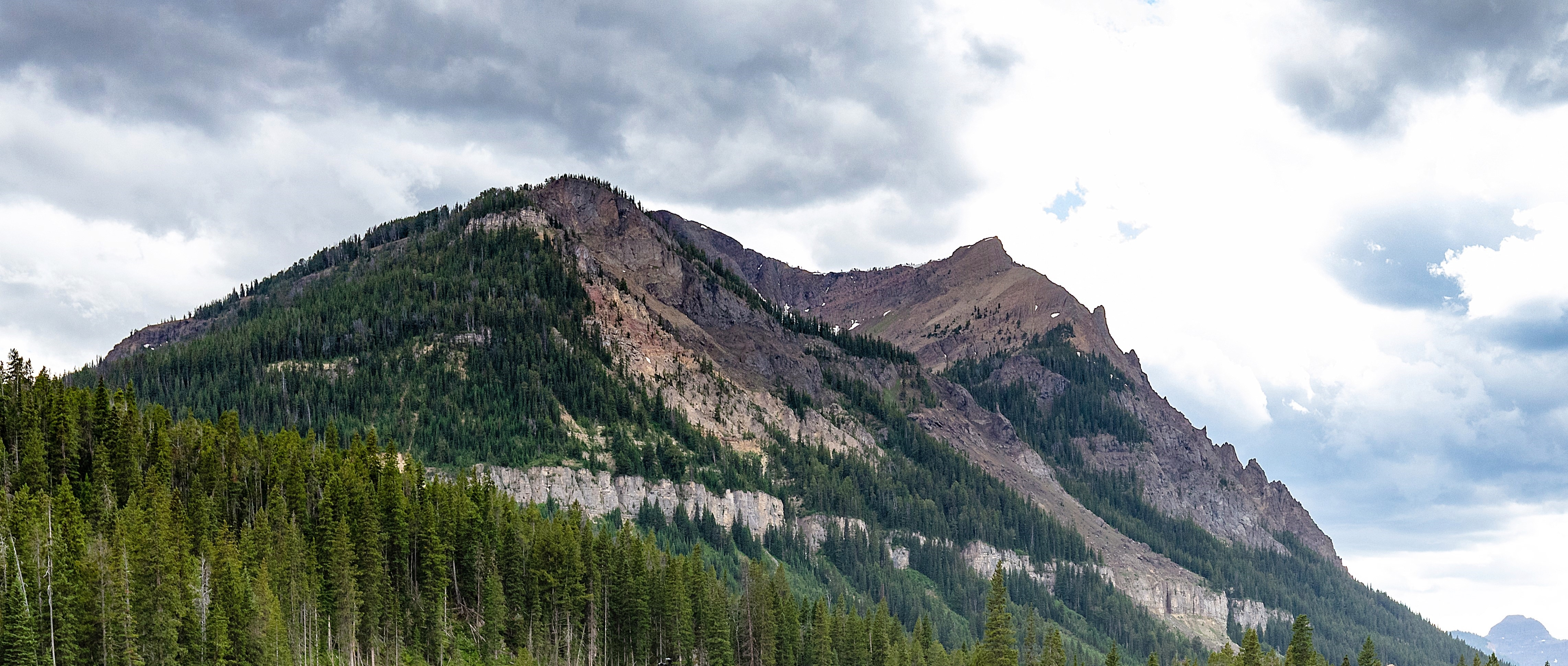

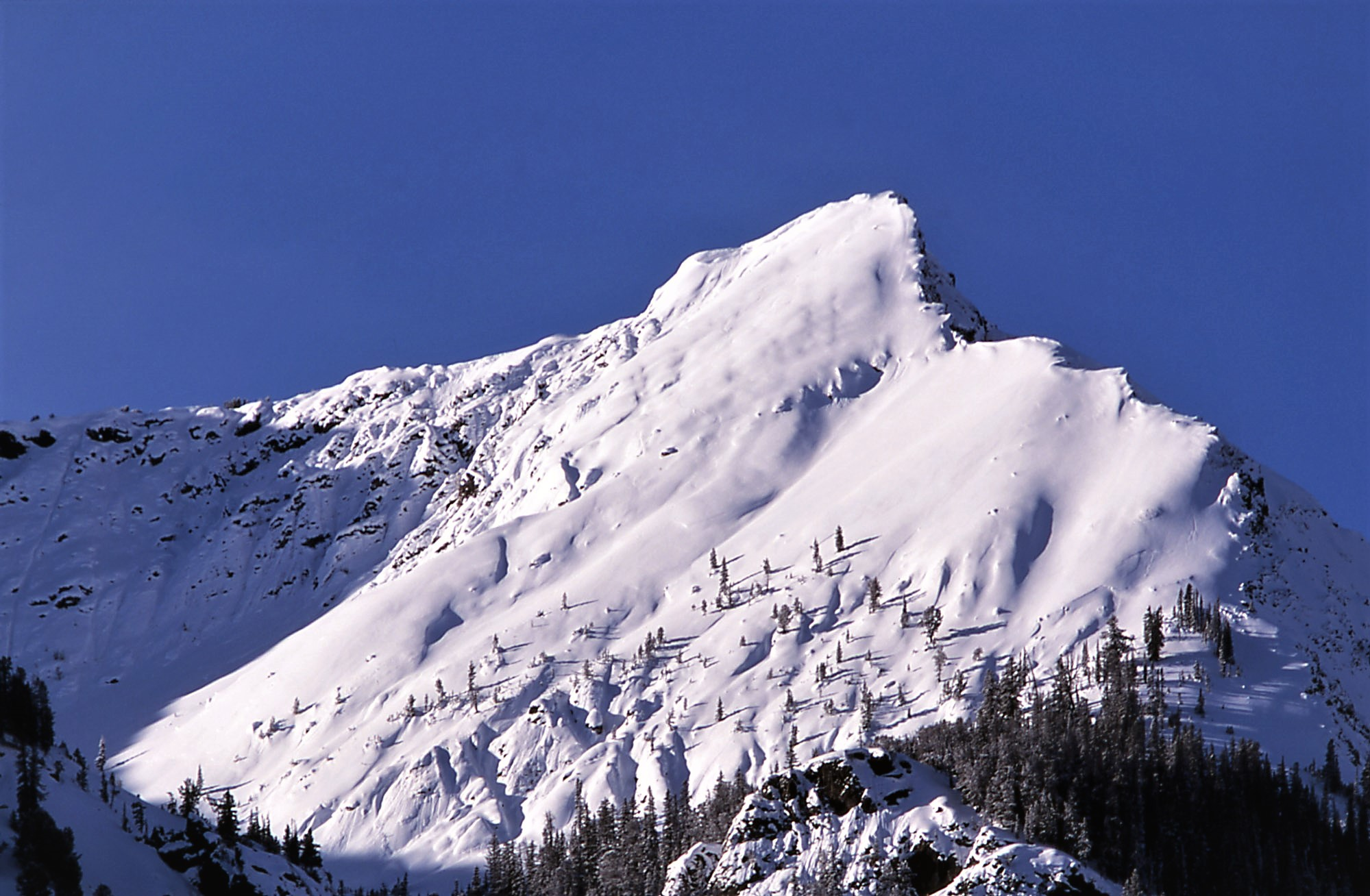

== See also ==
- List of mountain peaks of Wyoming
