= Harmston (disambiguation) =

Harmston is a village and civil parish in the North Kesteven district of Lincolnshire, England.

Harmston may also refer to:

== Places ==
- Harmston railway station, a station in Harmston, Lincolnshire
- Mount Harmston, a mountain on Vancouver Island, British Columbia, Canada

== People ==
- James D. Harmston, the founder of the True and Living Church of Jesus Christ of Saints of the Last Days
- Tim Harmston, a stand-up comedian

== Other ==
- Harmstonia, a genus of flies
