= Argus Mountain =

Mountain in the country of Canada

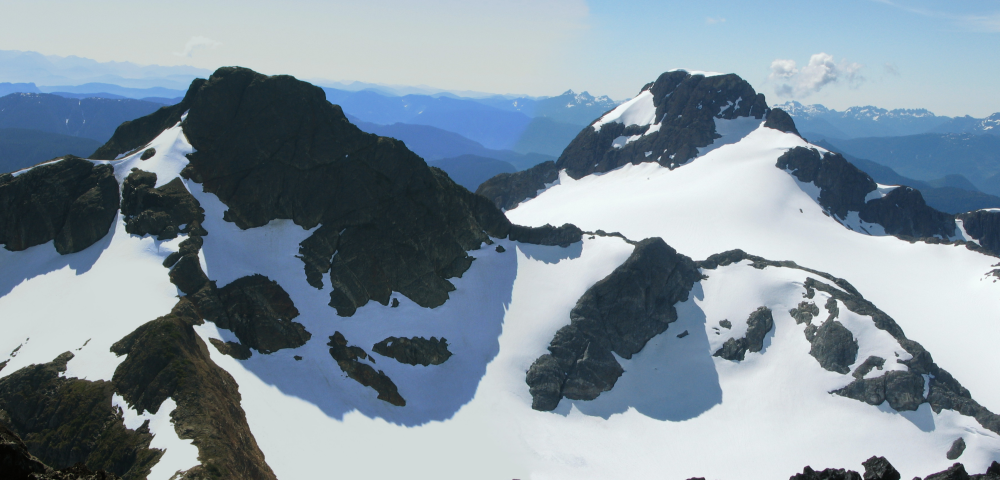
- Argus Mountain (left) and The Red Pillar (right)

Highest point
- Elevation: 1,994 m (6,542 ft)
- Prominence: 269 m (883 ft)
- Listing: Mountains of British Columbia
- Coordinates: 49°32′19″N 125°23′12″W

Geography
- Location within Vancouver Island Location within British Columbia
- Location in Strathcona Provincial Park
- Location: Vancouver Island, British Columbia, Canada
- District: Clayoquot Land District
- Parent range: Vancouver Island Ranges
- Topo map: NTS 92F11 Forbidden Plateau

Argus Mountain is a mountain on Vancouver Island, British Columbia, Canada, located 32 km (20 mi) southwest of Courtenay and 1 km (1 mi) north of The Red Pillar.

Argus Mountain is a member of the Vancouver Island Ranges which in turn form part of the Insular Mountains.

== History ==
Argus Mountain was named...

...to recognize the newspaper, Comox Argus, whose editor, Mr. Ben Hughes, attempted to climb this mountain in 1931. Argus in turn means "watchful guardian"

== Access ==
Given its stellar position surrounded by other island peaks, no direct routes exist to Argus Mountain. This mountain can be reached from other summits by crossing high alpine ridges and glaciers. It is frequently reached from the Comox Glacier and The Red Pillar.

== See also ==
- List of mountains in Strathcona Provincial Park
