= Amphitheatre Lake (Vancouver Island) =

- Location within Vancouver Island
- Location: Vancouver Island, British Columbia
- Coordinates: 49°42′00″N 125°24′00″W
- Lake type: Natural lake
- Basin countries: Canada

Amphitheatre Lake is a lake located on Vancouver Island north of Circlet Lake on Forbidden Plateau, Strathcona Provincial Park.

== See also ==
- List of lakes of British Columbia
