= Mount Harmston =

Mountain in the country of Canada

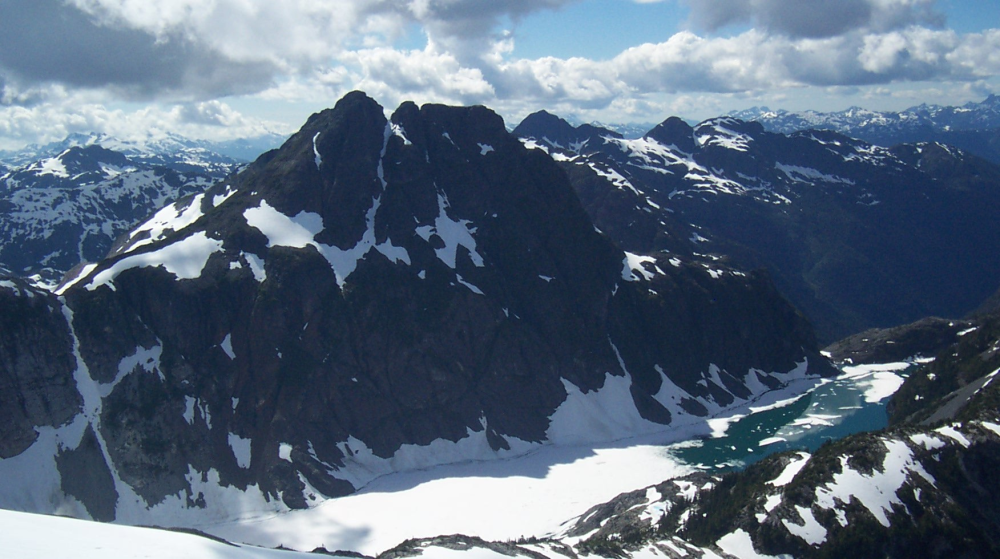

Highest point
- Elevation: 2,009 m (6,591 ft)
- Prominence: 375 m (1,230 ft)
- Coordinates: 49°32′56.0″N 125°23′53.9″W

Geography
- Location within Vancouver Island Location within British Columbia
- Location: Vancouver Island, British Columbia, Canada
- District: Clayoquot Land District
- Parent range: Vancouver Island Ranges
- Topo map: NTS 92F11 Forbidden Plateau

Mount Harmston is a mountain on Vancouver Island, British Columbia, Canada, located approximately 33 km (21 mi) southwest of Courtenay and 3 km (2 mi) north of The Red Pillar.

Mount Harmston is part of the Vancouver Island Ranges which in turn form part of the Insular Mountains.

== History ==
Mount Harmston is named after the Harmston family, early settlers of the Comox Valley. They settled on a 200+ acre preemption in early December 1862, coming from Lincolnshire, England.

== See also ==
- List of mountains in Strathcona Provincial Park
- List of mountains of Canada
