= Amphitheater Mountain =

Amphitheater Mountain may refer to:

- Amphitheater Mountain (Montana), in Glacier National Park
- Amphitheater Mountain (Washington), in Pasayten Wilderness
- Amphitheater Mountain (Wyoming), in Yellowstone National Park
