= Circlet Lake =

Lake in British Columbia, Canada

- Location within Vancouver Island
- Location: Vancouver Island, British Columbia
- Coordinates: 49°42′00″N 125°23′00″W
- Lake type: Natural lake
- Basin countries: Canada

Circlet Lake is a lake located on Vancouver Island on Forbidden Plateau at the head of Goss Creek. It is located in Strathcona Provincial Park and is a popular location for backcountry camping, hiking, and swimming, and is often used as an overnight stop by hikers summiting Mount Albert Edward.

== See also ==
- List of lakes of British Columbia
