= Amphitheatre Lake =

Amphitheatre Lake may refer to:

- Amphitheater Lake, Wyoming, U.S.
- Amphitheatre Lake (Antarctica)
- Amphitheatre Lake (Vancouver Island), lake on Vancouver Island, Canada
