= Comox Glacier =

Glacier in Canada

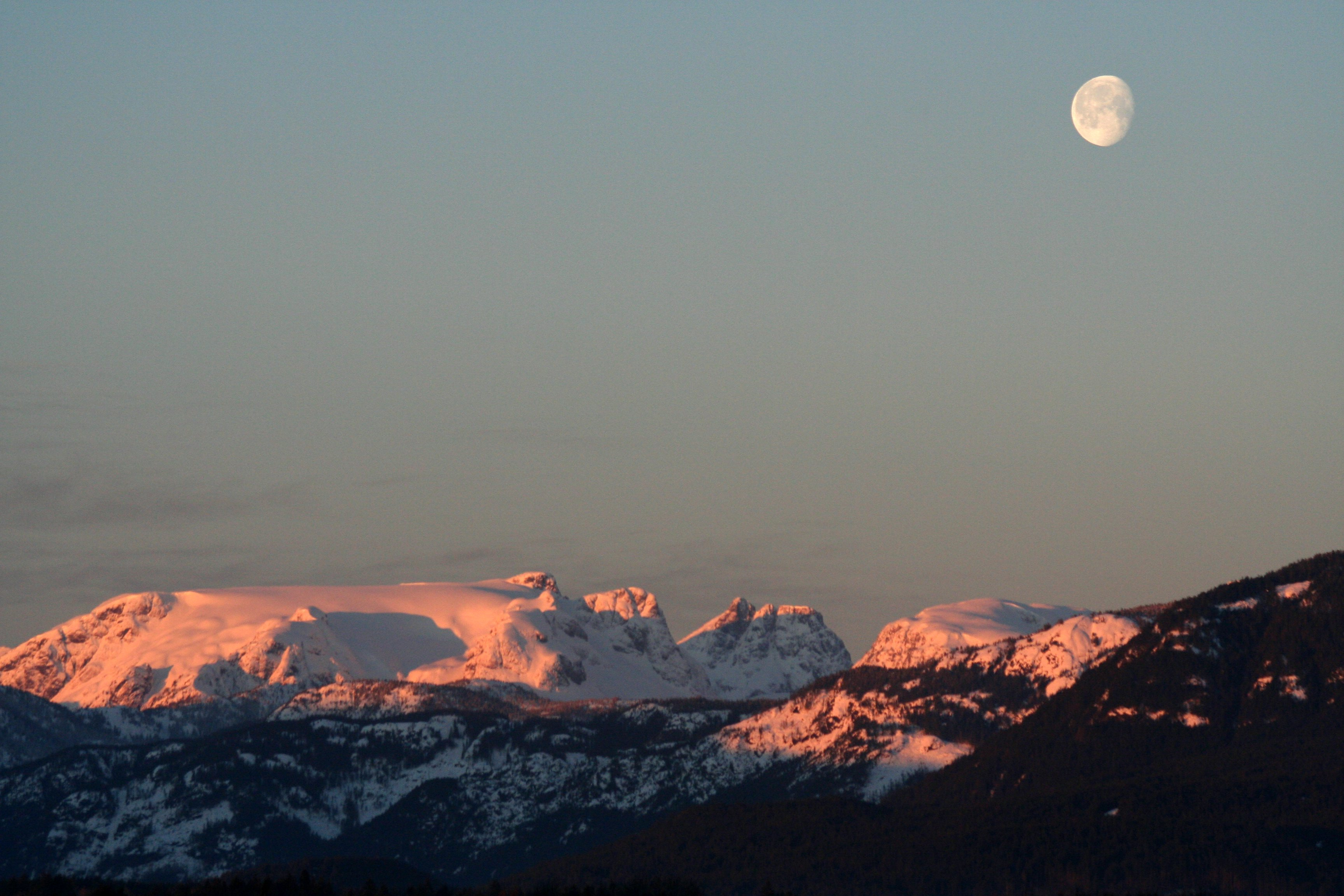
- Comox Glacier on a February morning

Highest point
- Elevation: 1,960 m (6,430 ft)
- Coordinates: 49°32′58″N 125°21′12″W

Geography
- Location within Vancouver Island Location within British Columbia
- Location: Alberni-Clayoquot Regional District
- District(s): Clayoquot Land District, Alberni-Clayoquot Regional District
- Parent range: Vancouver Island Ranges
- Topo map: NTS 92F11 Forbidden Plateau

Climbing
- First ascent: George Kinney, Alfred McNevin, James Tremlett and Harold Banks, August 1922

The Comox Glacier is a glacier in Strathcona Provincial Park on Vancouver Island, British Columbia, Canada, located 30 km (19 mi) southwest of Courtenay and 1 km (0.62 mi) west of Argus Mountain.

The highest elevation of the Comox Glacier, 1,960 m (6,430 ft), refers to a rocky outcrop on the north side of the glacier. Lacking an official name, it is referred to as the Comox Glacier summit.

The Comox Glacier is a member of the Vancouver Island Ranges which in turn form part of the Insular Mountains.

== History ==
The name Comox Glacier comes from the name of the K'ómoks First Nation who inhabit the area. They refer to the mountain by the name Kwénis, which means "whale". This name comes from a traditional account of the Great Flood: a whale was said to be trapped up on the mountain when the flood receded. In the early 1900s, the glacier was known as Dome Glacier. The name Comox Glacier was officially adopted in 1939, at the suggestion of the Comox & District Mountaineering Club.

== Access ==
There are two direct routes to the Comox Glacier:

1. Comox Glacier Trail (aka Frog's Pond Route) - the most direct route to the Comox Glacier. It begins where Datsio Creek meets Comox Creek. The route initially heads up the valley towards Century Sam Lake, but quickly gains the ridge to the west. The route follows the height of the ridge up to Lone Tree Pass, and on to the south flanks of the Comox Glacier.

2. Kookjai Route - this route starts at Cougar Lake, near the Comox Gap. It traverses over Kookjai Mountain and Black Cat Mountain before meeting up with the Comox Glacier Trail at Lone Tree Pass.

Alternatively, the Comox Glacier can be accessed by traversing from Argus Mountain to the west, or climbing up from Milla Lake to the north.

== See also ==
- List of mountains in Strathcona Provincial Park
- Vancouver Island Ranges
- Forbidden Plateau
