= Panther Lake (Orange County, Florida) =

Coordinates: 28.42566°N 81.62666°W

- Location within Florida Location within the United States
- Location: Orange County, Florida
- Type: Natural freshwater lake
- Basin countries: United States
- Max. length
- Surface area: 76.49 acres (30.95 ha)
- Average depth: 10.0 ft (3.0 m)
- Water volume: 111,767,040 US gal (423,084,300 L; 93,065,530 imp gal)
- Surface elevation: 95 ft (29 m)

Panther Lake is a natural freshwater lake on the north side of Walt Disney World, in Orange County, Florida. In fact, a small part of the lake is within the boundaries of Walt Disney World. This lake originally had an irregular shape and today parts of the lake are filled in, because of encroaching development. On the west side of the lake is Florida State Road 429, a toll highway. On the south, east and northeast is Watermark Winter Garden, a large housing development. On most of the rest of the north is Orange County National Golf Center and Lodge.

This lake has no public boat docks, no public swimming areas and virtually no public access.
