= Panther Lake (Vancouver Island) =

- Location within Vancouver Island
- Location: Vancouver Island, British Columbia
- Coordinates: 49°41′06.0″N 125°18′57.8″W
- Lake type: Natural lake
- Basin countries: Canada

Panther Lake is a lake located on Vancouver Island on Forbidden Plateau south of Lake Helen MacKenzie.

== See also ==
- List of lakes of British Columbia
