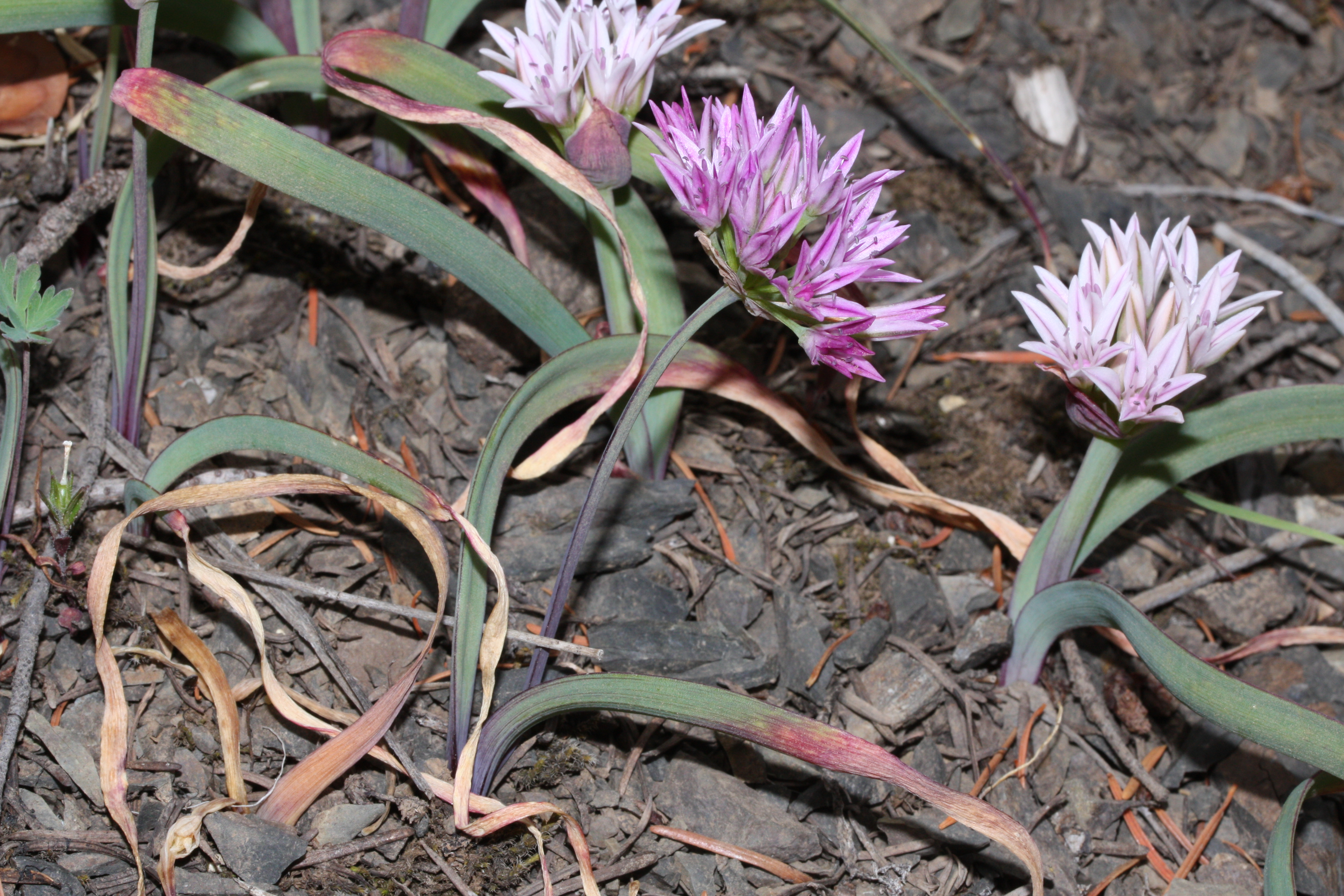

Conservation status
- Apparently Secure (NatureServe)

Scientific classification
- Kingdom: Plantae
- Clade: Tracheophytes
- Clade: Angiosperms
- Clade: Monocots
- Order: Asparagales
- Family: Amaryllidaceae
- Subfamily: Allioideae
- Genus: Allium
- Species: A. crenulatum

Binomial name
- Allium crenulatum Wiegand

Synonyms
- Allium cascadense M.Peck; Allium vancouverense Macoun; Allium watsonii Howell

= Allium crenulatum =

Olympic onion

Species of flowering plant

Allium crenulatum, common name Olympic onion, is a plant species native to Oregon, Washington, and British Columbia. It grows in the Cascades, the Coast Ranges, the Olympic Mountains, the Wenatchee Mountains, and the mountains on Vancouver Island. There is one report from Alabama, but this needs verification. The species grows on talus slopes and in alpine tundra at elevations of 600–2500 m.

Allium crenulatum produces ovoid bulbs up to 2 cm long, formed on rhizomes some distance from the parent bulb. Its leaves are flat, up to 35 cm long, sometimes with minute teeth along the margins. Scape is flattened and winged, up to 15 cm tall. Umbel is compact, with up to 25 flowers. Flowers bell-shaped, up to 13 mm across; tepals pink with darker pink midveins; anthers yellow or purple; pollen yellow.
