= Amphitheater Mountain (Wyoming) =

Mountain in the state of Wyoming

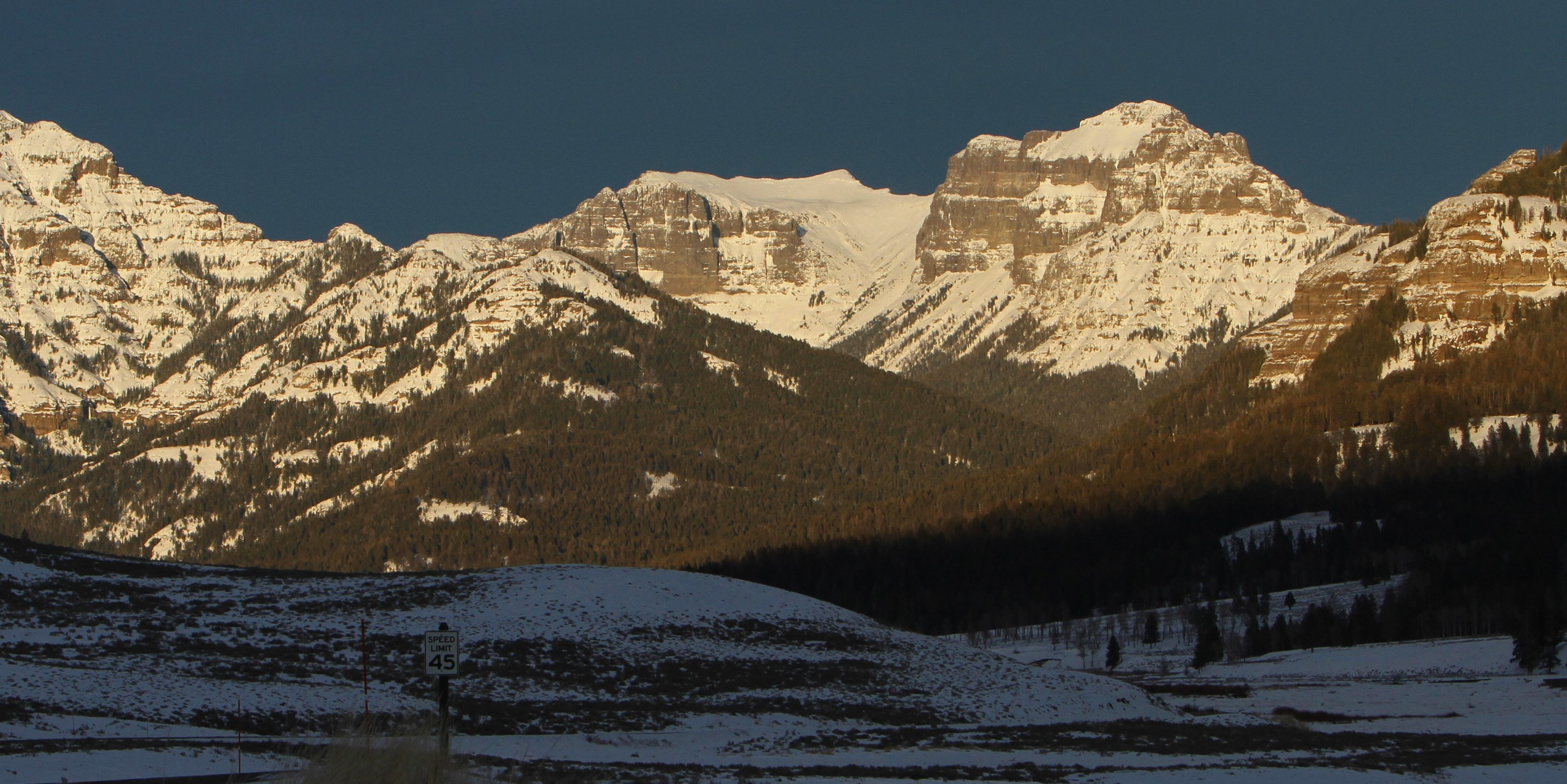
- Southwest aspect

Highest point
- Elevation: 11,042 ft (3,366 m)
- Prominence: 1,422 ft (433 m)
- Parent peak: Pilot Peak (11,522 ft)
- Isolation: 5.60 mi (9.01 km)
- Coordinates: 44°58′25″N 109°59′55″W

Geography
- Location within Wyoming Location within the United States
- Location: Yellowstone National Park; Park County, Wyoming, U.S.
- Parent range: Absaroka Range; Rocky Mountains
- Topo map: USGS Pilot Peak

Geology
- Rock type: volcanic

Amphitheater Mountain is a prominent 11,042-foot-elevation (3,366-meter) mountain summit located in Park County, Wyoming, United States.

== Description ==
The peak is situated southwest of the town of Cooke City, Montana, at the northeast corner of Yellowstone National Park, two miles south of the park's Northeast Entrance Station. It is part of the Absaroka Range, and a portion of the mountain is within the North Absaroka Wilderness. Topographic relief is significant as the north aspect rises over 3,600 feet (1,100 meters) above Silver Gate in two miles. Volcanoes of the early Eocene supplied the material that formed the mountain 50–55 million years ago, and here created some of the most rugged terrain in Yellowstone Park. The mountain's name has been officially adopted by the United States Board on Geographic Names.

== Climate ==
According to the Köppen climate classification system, Amphitheater Mountain is located in a subarctic climate zone with long, cold, snowy winters, and cool to warm summers. Temperatures can drop below −10 °F with wind chill factors below −30 °F. Precipitation runoff from the mountain drains into tributaries of the Lamar River.

== Gallery ==
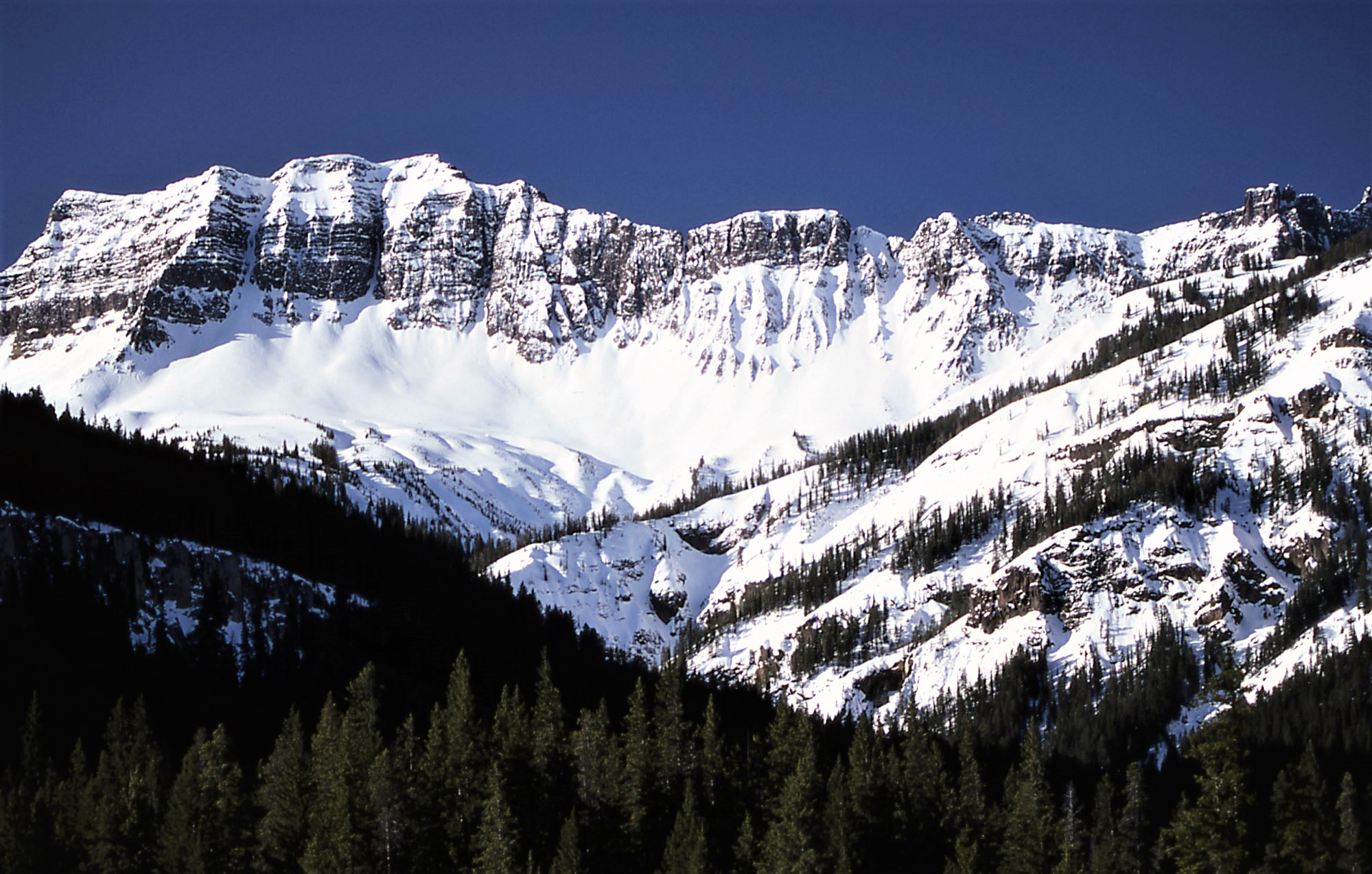
Amphitheater Mountain with snow from Silver Gate, Montana

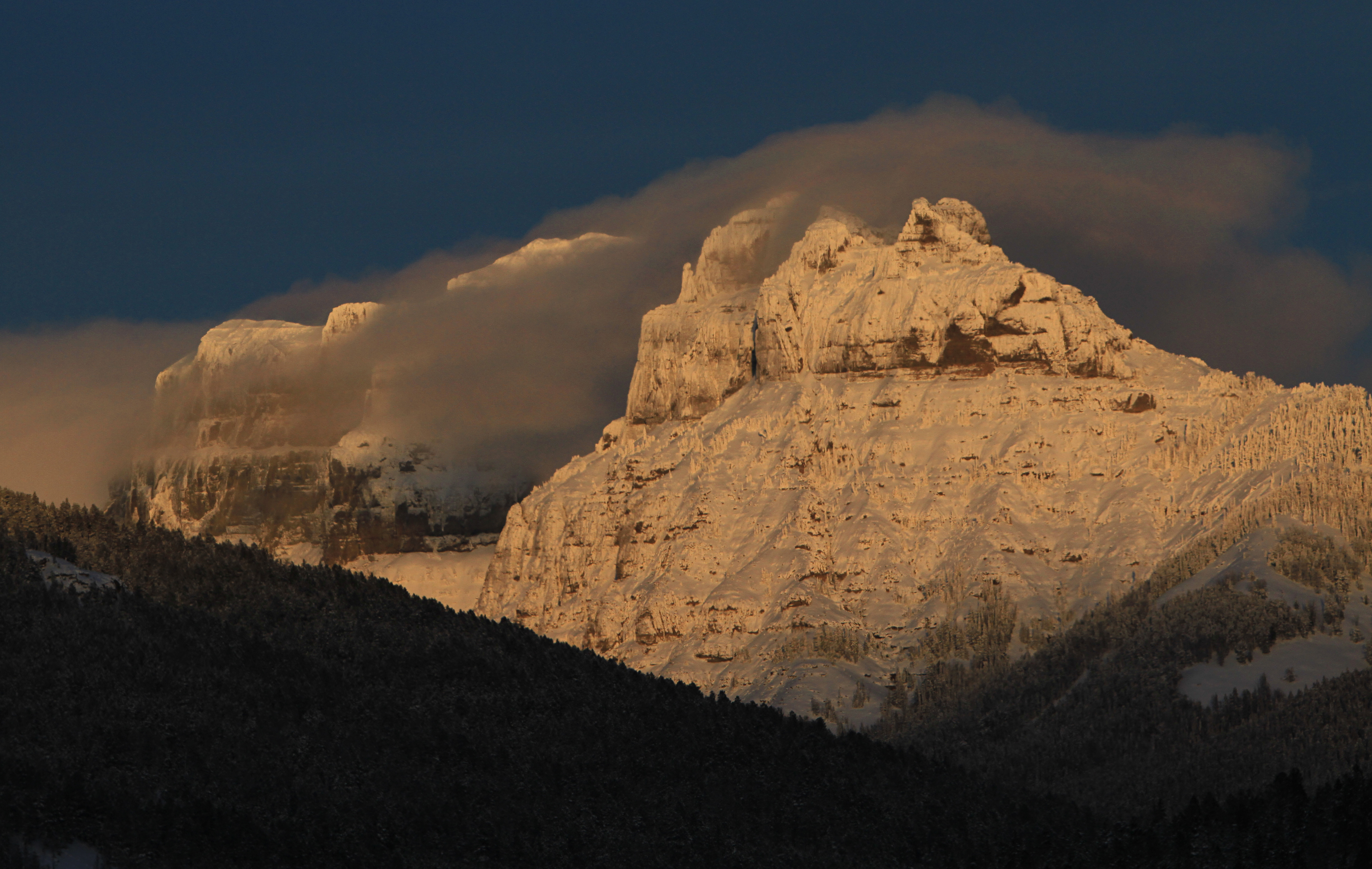
North aspect

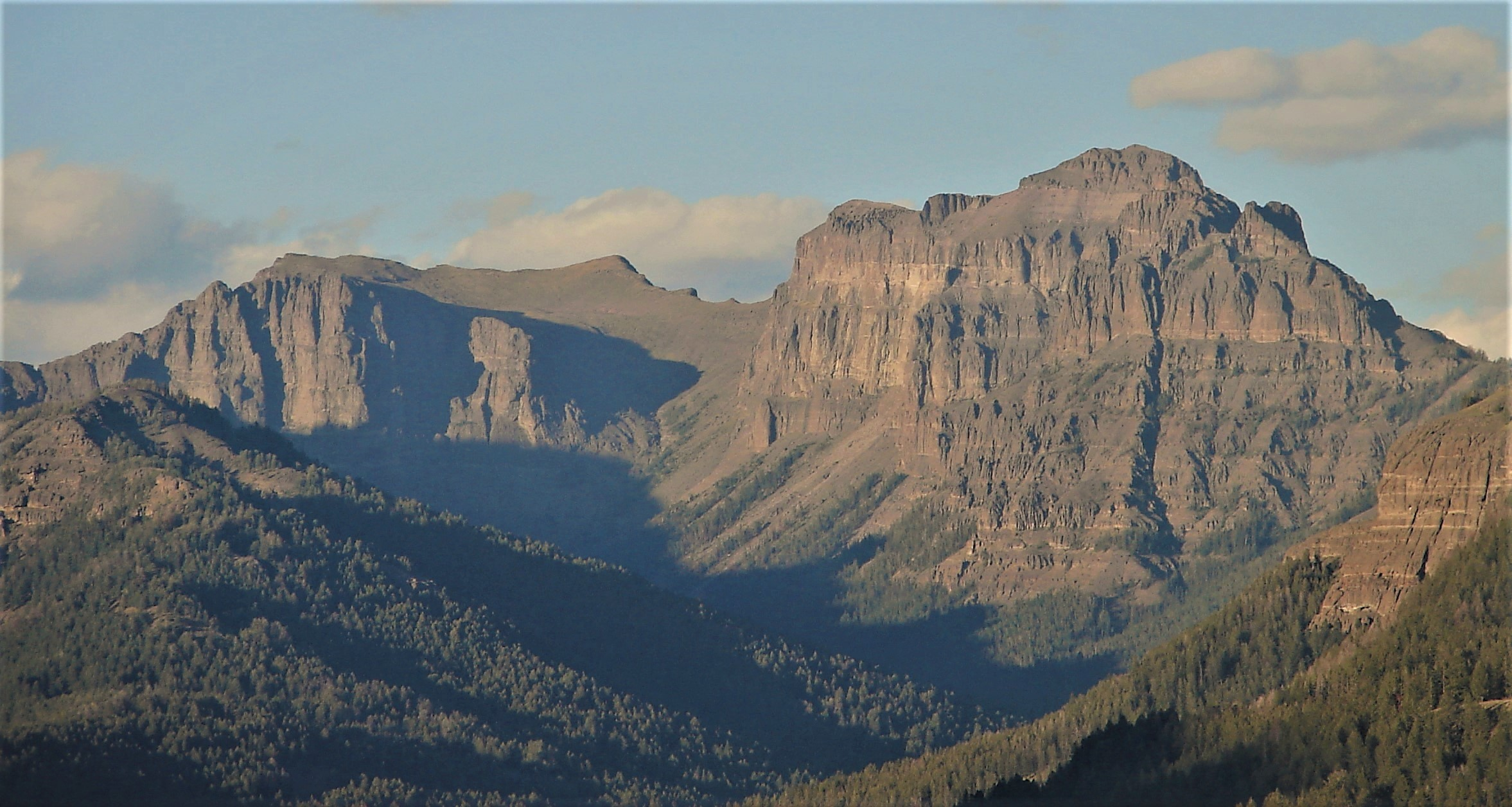
From the southwest with summit left of center

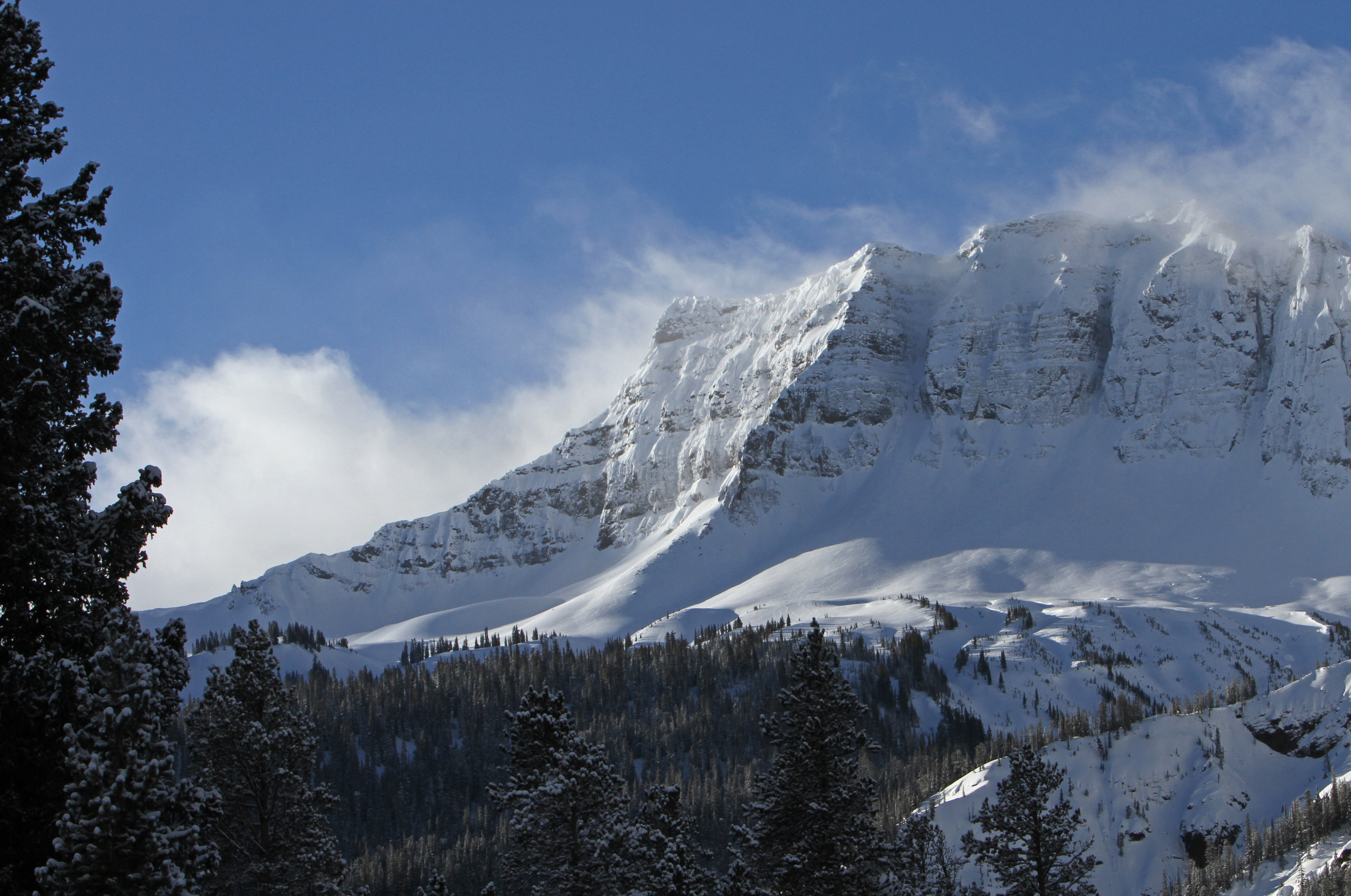
from north

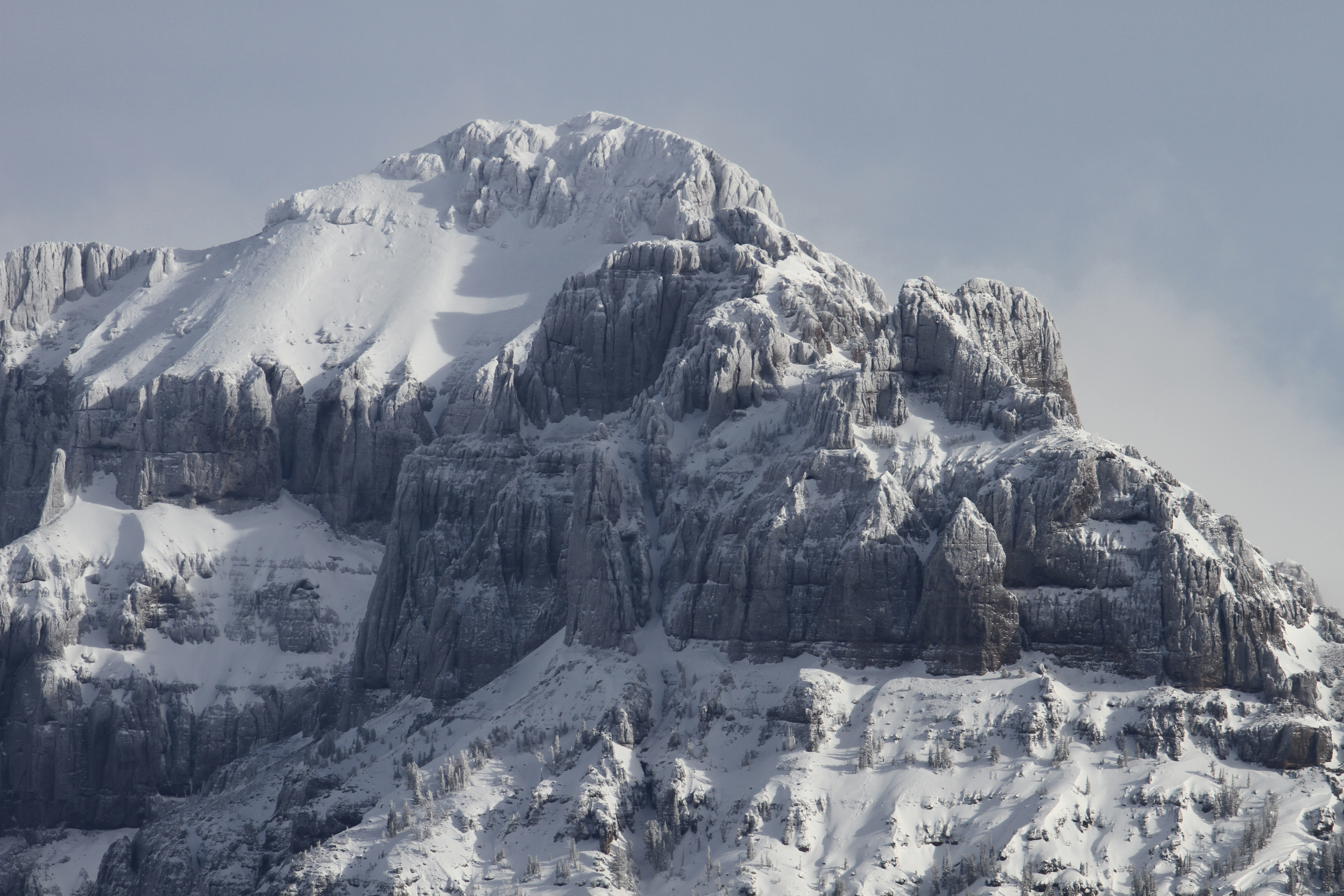
subsidiary peaks on the south ridge

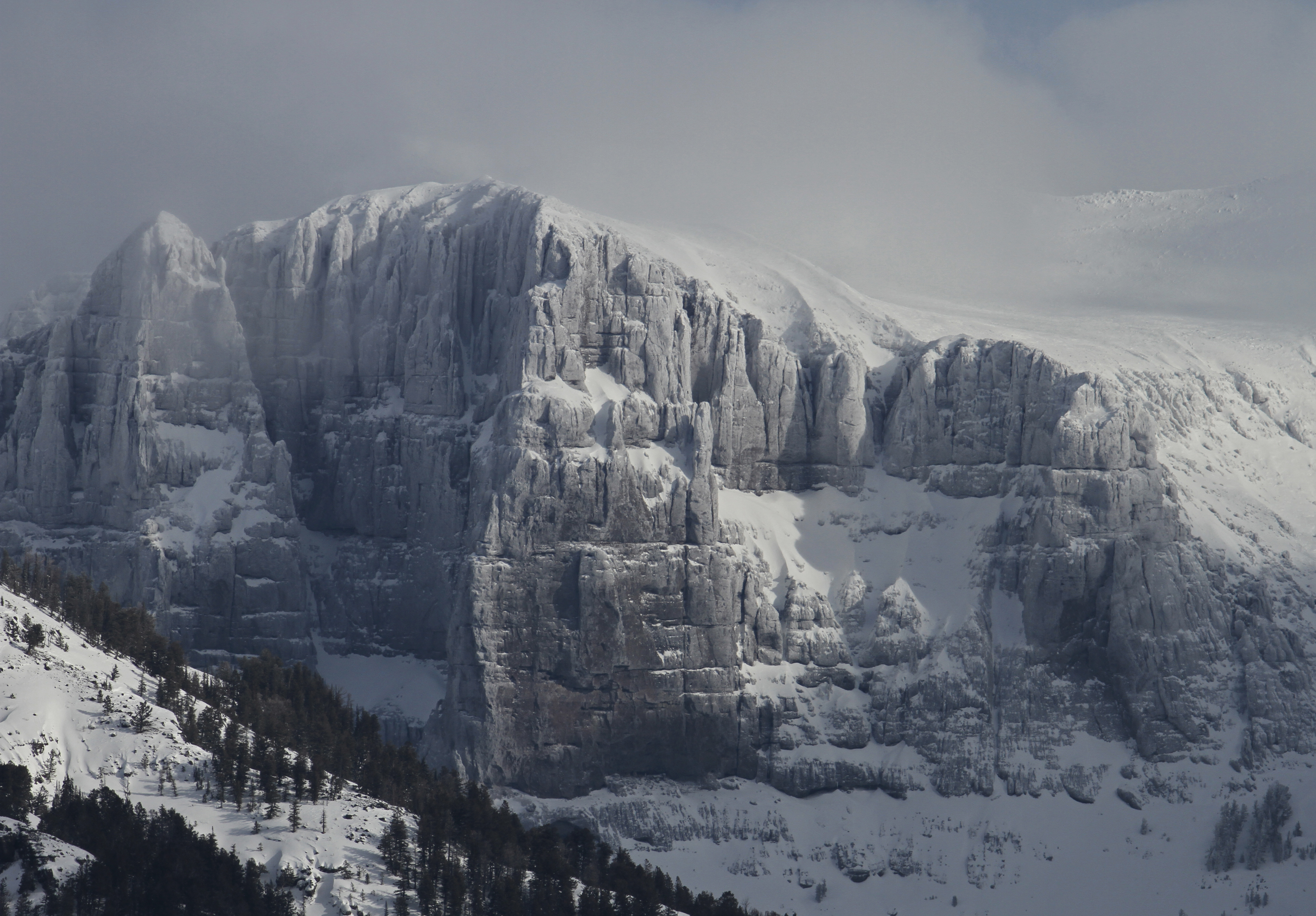
west ridge

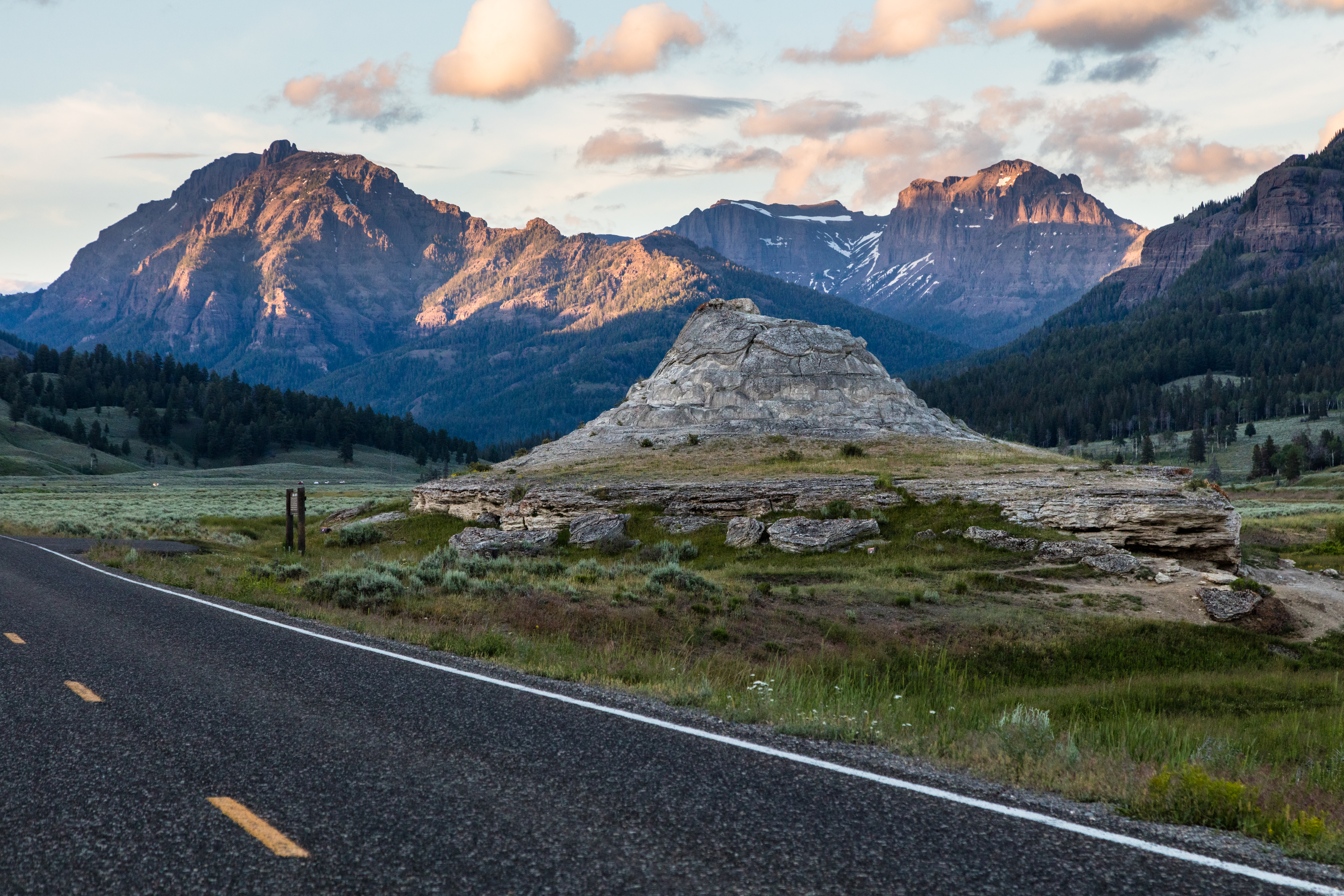
Soda Butte and Amphitheater Mountain at sunset

== See also ==
- List of mountain peaks of Wyoming
