= Comox Land District =

Land district in British Columbia, Canada

Coordinates: 49°45′00″N 125°15′00″W

Comox Land District is one of the 59 land districts of British Columbia, Canada, which are part of the cadastral divisions of British Columbia, created with rest of those on Vancouver Island via the Lands Act of the Colony of Vancouver Island. The British Columbia government's BC Names system, a subdivision of GeoBC, defines a land district as "a territorial division with legally defined boundaries for administrative purposes". All land titles and surveys use the Land District system as the primary point of reference, and entries in BC Names for placenames and geographical objects are so listed.

== Description ==
Comox Land District lies between Nelson Land District to the south, Sayward Land District to the north, and Nootka Land District to the west. There is a maritime boundary in the Strait of Georgia with New Westminster Land District on the southeast, and with Sayward Land District on the northwest.

=== Boundary ===
Beginning at a point in Discovery Passage offshore from the southern part of the City of Campbell River, and the southern end of Quadra Island, at roughly 50 degrees 0 minutes north latitude and 125 degrees 12 minutes 51 seconds west longitude, then along that latitude west, with some minor variances around land parcels to 50 degrees 0 minutes north latitude at 125 degrees 41 minutes 8 seconds west longitude, then south along that longitude to 49 degrees 54 minutes 29 seconds north latitude, then west along that latitude to 125 degrees 45 minutes 58 seconds west longitude, then via a straight diagonal line southeast to 49 degrees 37 minutes 31 seconds north latitude at 125 degrees 24 minutes 17 seconds west longitude, then east to 125 degrees 0 minutes 9 seconds west longitude, just west of the town of Cumberland and north along that longitude to 49 degrees 39 minutes 15 seconds north latitude. From there, a short distance east to 124 degrees 59 minutes 51 seconds west longitude, and south along that longitude to 49 degrees 39 minutes north latitude, and 124 degrees 58 minutes 31 seconds west longitude, north along that longitude to 49 degrees 39 minutes 10 seconds north latitude at 124 degrees and east along that latitude to 124 degrees 57 minutes 45 seconds west longitude, following that longitude south to 49 degrees 38 minutes 50 seconds north longitude to 124 west 57 minutes 5 seconds west longitude to the shoreline of Vancouver Island at 49 degrees 39 minutes 3 seconds north latitude and 124 west 57 minutes 5 seconds west longitude, then via maritime boundaries in the Strait of Georgia back to Discovery Passage.

== Communities ==
- Courtenay
- Comox
- Oyster Bay
- Saratoga Beach
- Ocean Grove
- Williams Beach
- Merville
- Little River
- the southern portion of the City of Campbell River

== See also ==
- List of land districts of British Columbia
