= Mount Albert Edward (British Columbia) =

Mountain in British Columbia, Canada

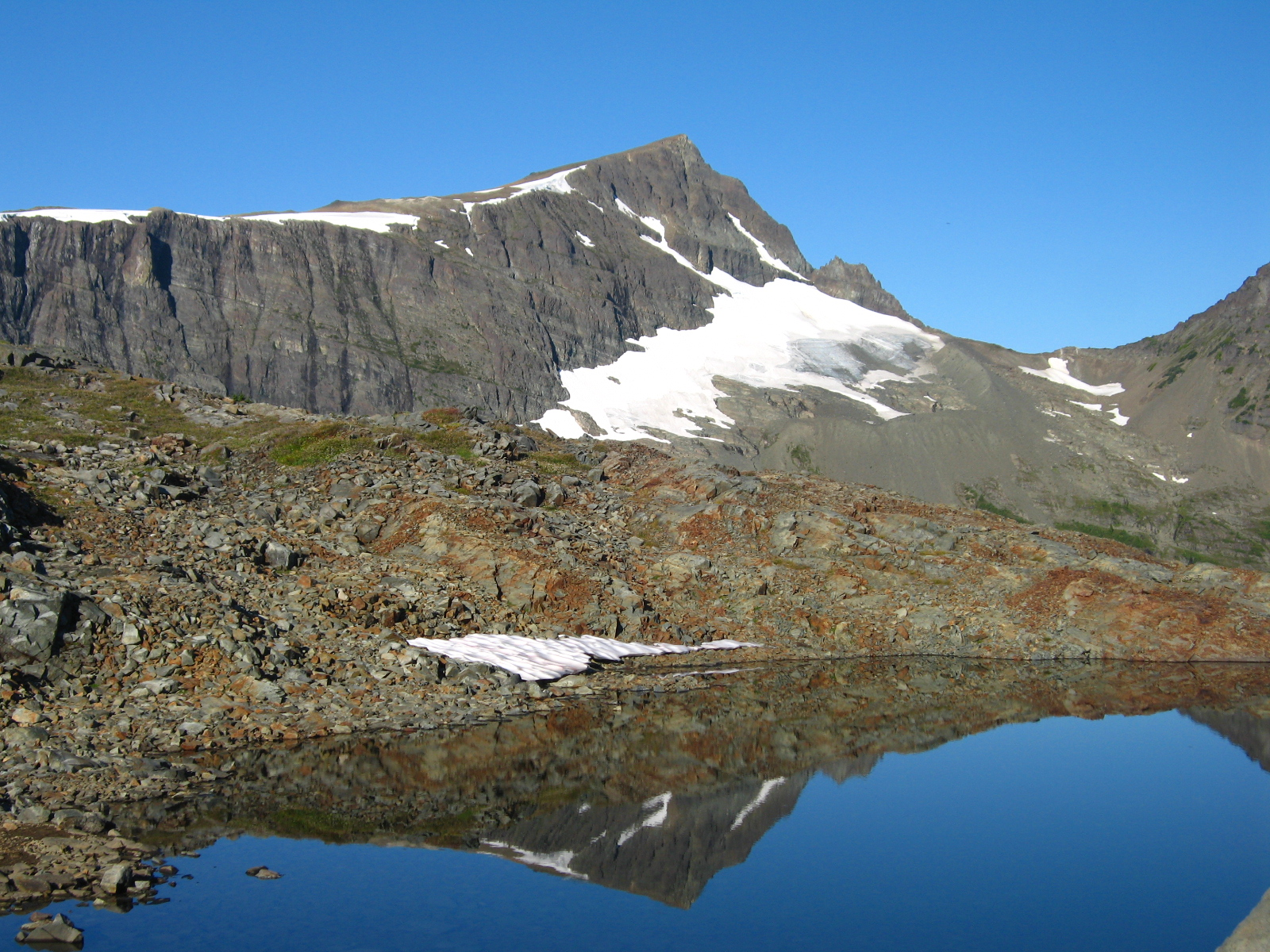
- Summit of Mount Albert Edward

Highest point
- Elevation: 2,093 m (6,867 ft)
- Prominence: 1,203 m (3,947 ft)
- Listing: Mountains of British Columbia
- Coordinates: 49°40′40″N 125°25′54″W

Geography
- Location within Vancouver Island Location within British Columbia
- Interactive map of Mount Albert Edward
- Location: Vancouver Island, British Columbia, Canada
- District: Comox Land District
- Parent range: Vancouver Island Ranges
- Topo map: NTS 92F11 Forbidden Plateau

Climbing
- First ascent: 1890 by William Ralph
- Easiest route: Hikers route via the North East Ridge accessed from Paradise Meadows

Mount Albert Edward is the sixth highest peak on Vancouver Island and one of the most easily accessible. Located in Strathcona Provincial Park, the mountain is a popular destination both in summer for hikers and in winter for skiers and snowshoers. The mountain is named for Albert Edward, the Prince of Wales, later Edward VII.

== See also ==
- List of mountains in Strathcona Provincial Park
- Royal eponyms in Canada
