= Forbidden Plateau =

Highland area, near Comox, Vancouver Island, BC

- Plateau
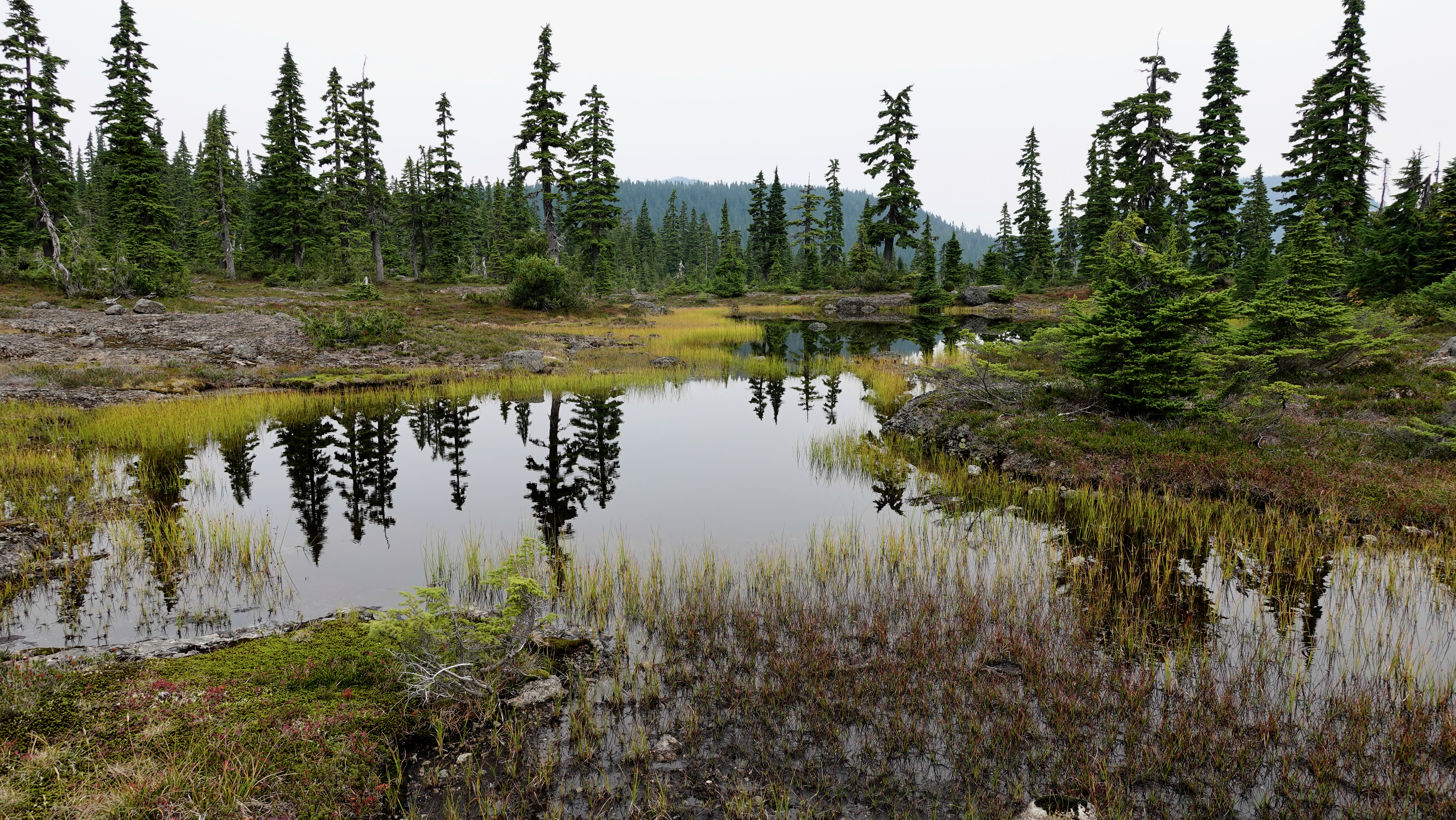
- One of the many lakes of the Forbidden Plateau

- Location within British Columbia
- Coordinates: 49°41′00″N 125°19′00″W
- Location: British Columbia, Canada
- Part of: Vancouver Island Ranges
- Topo map: NTS 92F11 Forbidden Plateau
- Website: Strathcona Provincial Park: Forbidden Plateau Area

The Forbidden Plateau is a small, hilly plateau in the east of the Vancouver Island Ranges in British Columbia, northwest of Comox Lake roughly between Mount Albert Edward to the southwest and Mount Washington to the northeast.

== Geography ==
The plateau features gently sloping sub-alpine terrain broken up by small, rugged hills and pitted with small lakes. Much of it is contained within Strathcona Provincial Park, and a network of trails facilitate hiking, cross country skiing, and access to Mount Albert Edward. A sub-alpine meadow on Mount Becher in the southwest corner of the plateau is one of only a few locations in Canada where the Olympic onion can be found.

=== Geology ===
The plateau was the epicentre of the 1946 Vancouver Island earthquake that registered 7.3 on the Richter magnitude scale, the strongest ever recorded on land in Canada.

== Legend ==
According to the popular, though disproven, legend, when the K'ómoks faced raids from other coastal tribes, they took their women and children to the plateau for safekeeping. During a raid by the Cowichan, the women and children vanished without a trace. When a member of the tribe went looking for the women and children within the Forbidden Plateau, he found red lichen covering the snow and nearby rocks and assumed the lichen to be blood from the family members. Since then, the plateau became taboo for it was believed that it was inhabited by evil spirits who had consumed those they had sent.

This legend, however, has no basis in K'ómoks history, a fact which has been documented by sources such as Comox Valley environmentalist Ruth Masters and Pat Trask, curator at the Courtenay Museum. Clinton Wood and Ben Hughes appear to be the creators of the false legend, the first record of which can be found in an article by Hughes in The Province newspaper in 1927. In a book published in 1967, Wood takes credit for the legend, stating that he believed a bit of mystery would help publicize the attraction of the plateau.

== See also ==
- Comox Glacier
- Panther Lake
