= List of lakes of British Columbia =

This is an incomplete list of lakes of British Columbia, a province of Canada.

== Larger lake statistics ==

British Columbia lakes larger than 400 km^{2} (150 sq mi)
Lake	Area (including islands)	Altitude	Max. depth	Volume
Williston Lake	1,761 km^{2} (680 sq mi)	671 m (2,201 ft)		
Nechako Reservoir	890 km^{2} (340 sq mi)	853 m (2,799 ft)	305 m (1,001 ft)	
Atlin Lake	775 km^{2} (299 sq mi)	668 m (2,192 ft)		
Babine Lake	495 km^{2} (191 sq mi)	711 m (2,333 ft)		
Kootenay Lake	407 km^{2} (157 sq mi)	532 m (1,745 ft)		

*"Nechako Reservoir". BC Geographical Names. Government of British Columbia – B.C. Geographical Names Office (BCGNO).

== List of lakes ==
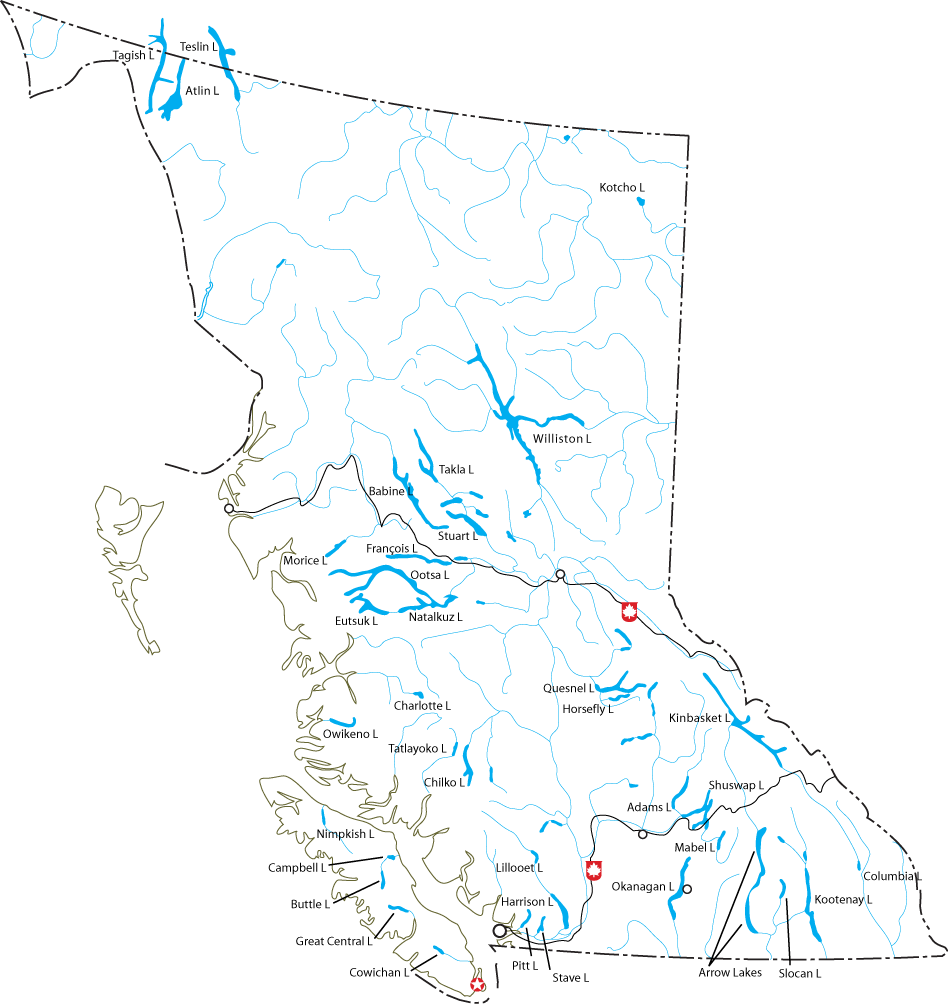
Lakes of British Columbia. See actual size.

== 1 ==
- 101 Mile Lake
- 103 Mile Lake
- 105 Mile Lake
- 108 Mile Lake

== A ==
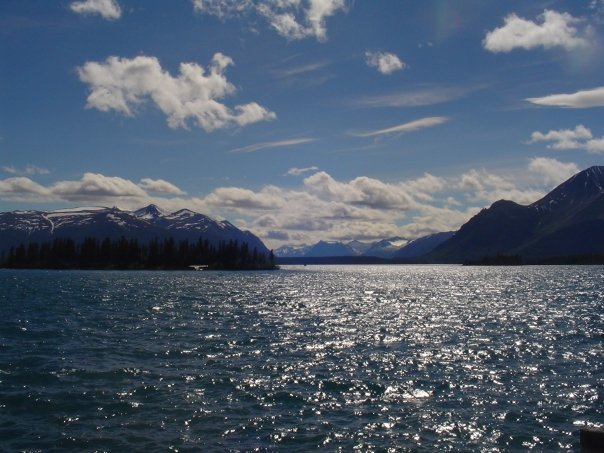
Atlin Lake

- Adams Lake
- Albreda Lake
- Alouette Lake
- Alice Lake
- Allison Lake
- Alta Lake
- Ambrose Lake
- Amor Lake
- Anderson Lake
- Angora Lake
- Angus Horne Lake
- Arrow Lakes
- Atlin Lake
- Azouzetta Lake
- Azure Lake

== B ==
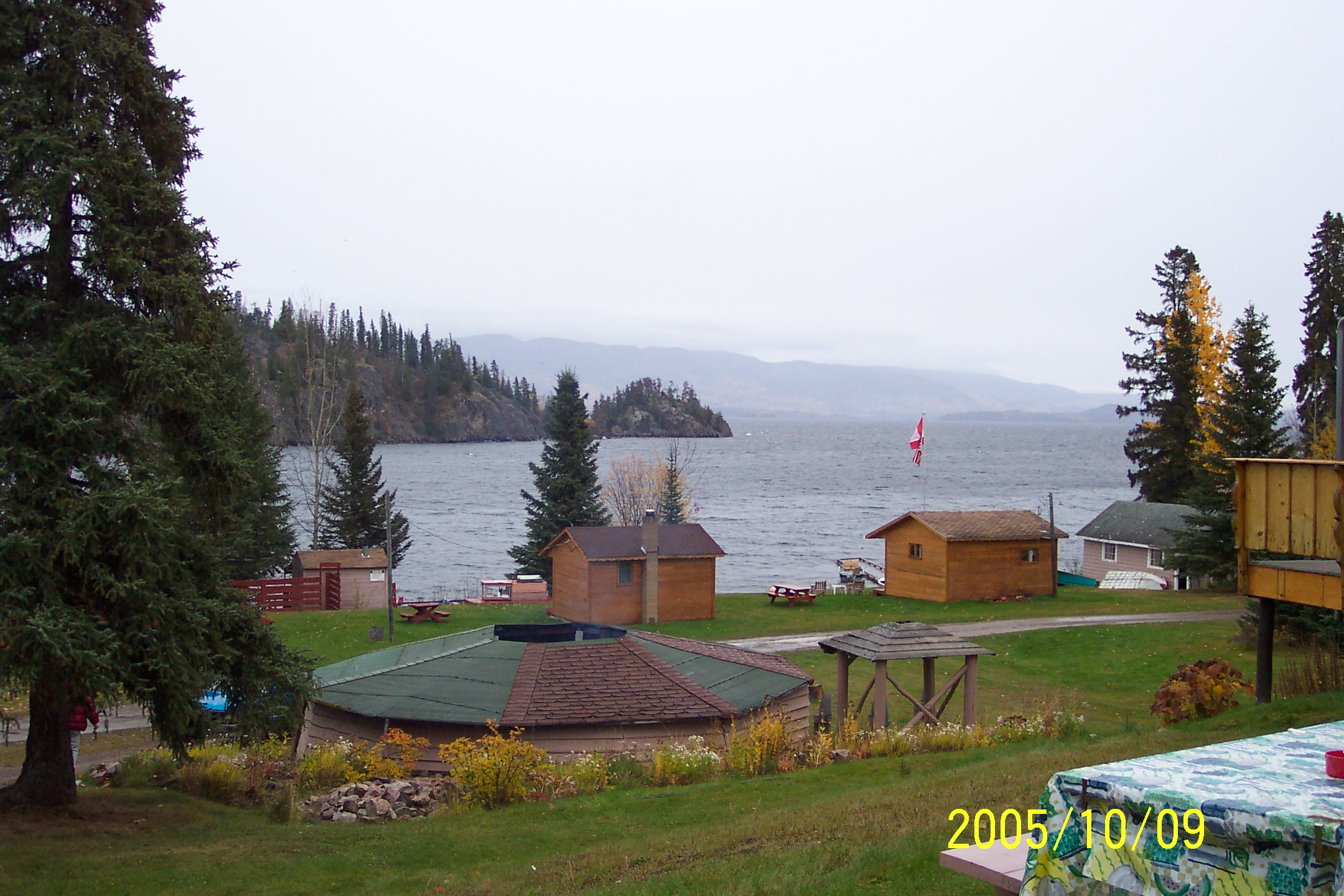
Babine Lake

- Babine Lake
- Ball Lake
- Barrett Lake
- Barrier Lake
- Battleship Lake
- Bear Lake
- Bennett Lake
- Berg Lake
- Bolton Lake
- Brewster Lake
- Bridge Lake
- Brigade Lake
- Buckley Lake
- Bughouse Lake
- Buntzen Lake
- Burnaby Lake
- Buttle Lake

== C ==
- Cahilty Lake
- Cameron Lake
- Canim Lake
- Capilano Lake
- Carp Lake Provincial Park
- Carpenter Lake
- Cecil Lake
- Chadsey Lake
- Champion Lakes Provincial Park
- Charlie Lake
- Charlotte Lake
- Cheakamus Lake
- Chehalis Lake
- Cheslatta Lake
- Chilcotin Lake
- Chilko Lake
- Chilliwack Lake
- Christina Lake
- Chute Lake
- Clearwater Lake
- Clendinning Lake
- Clowhom Lake
- Columbia Lake
- Como Lake
- Comox Lake
- Consinka Lake
- Coquitlam Lake
- Costalot Lake
- Cowichan Lake
- Croteau Lake
- Cuisson Lake
- Cultus Lake, British Columbia
- Cunningham Lake

== D ==
- Davis Lake
- Dease Lake
- Decker Lake
- Deer Lake
- Deka Lake
- Devick Lake (British Columbia)
- Divers Lake
- Downton Lake
- Duffey Lake
- Duncan (Amazay) Lake
- Duncan Lake (British Columbia)

== E ==
- Eagle Lake
- Effingham Lake: located on Vancouver Island at the head of Effingham River and northeast of Kennedy Lake.
- Elfin Lakes
- Elk Lake
- Elk Lakes
- Elsay Lake
- Elsie Lake
- Emerald Lake
- Lake Errock
- Evans Lake

== F ==
- Faith Lake
- Floe Lake
- Forbush Lake
- Fortress Lake
- François Lake
- Frog Lakes
- Frozen Lake

== G ==
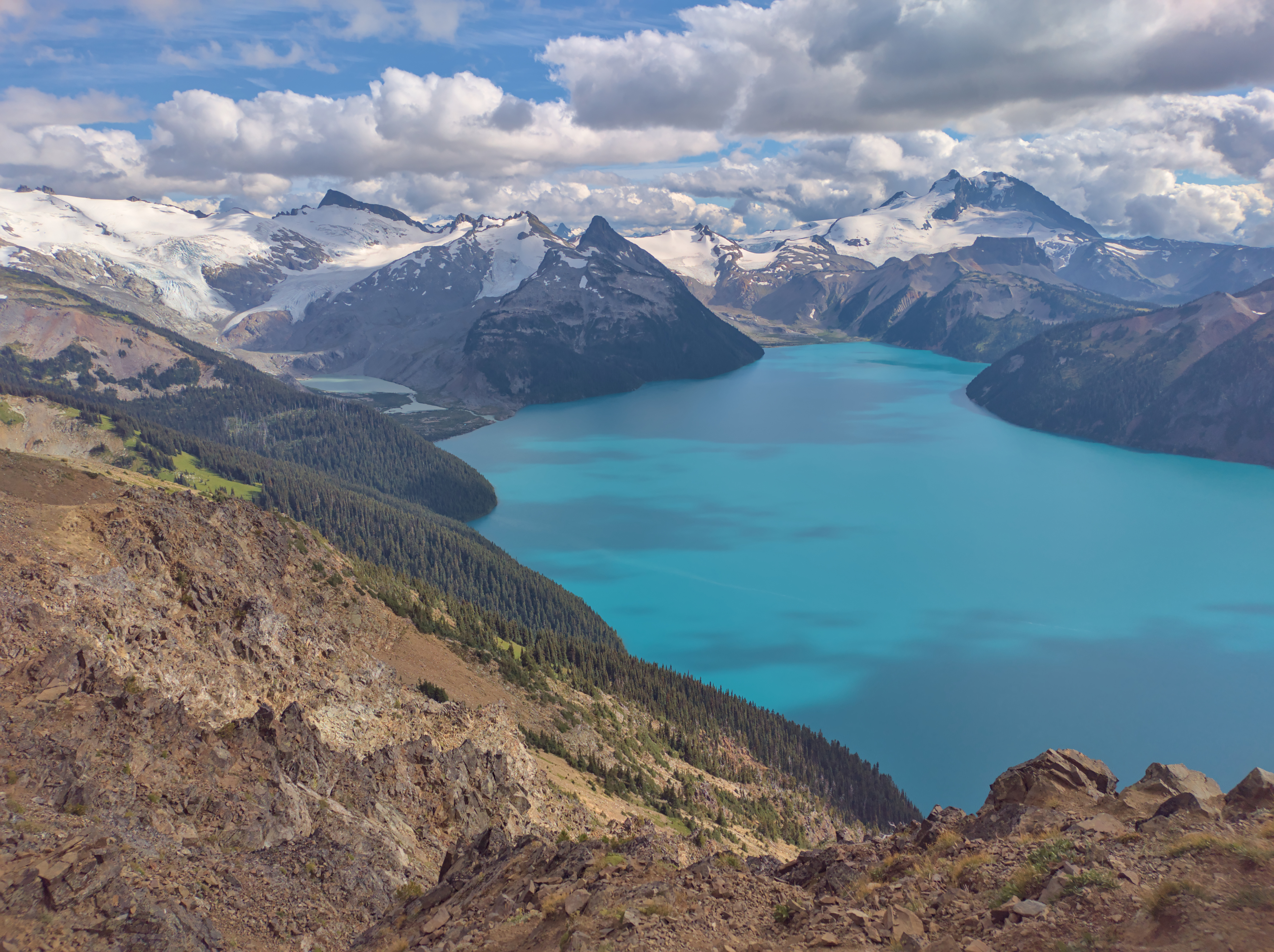
Garibaldi Lake

- Garibaldi Lake
- Gates Lake
- Granite Lake (Kawdy Plateau)
- Granite Lake (Powell River)
- Great Central Lake
- Green Lake (Cariboo)
- Green Lake (Whistler)
- Greendrop Lake
- Greig Lake
- Gun Lake
- Gunanoot Lake

== H ==
- Harrison Lake
- Hatzic Lake
- Hawthorn Lake
- Hayward Lake
- Hobson Lake
- Horne Lake
- Horsefly Lake
- Howard Lake

== I ==
- Ilthpaya Lake
- Inga Lake
- Inland Lake Provincial Park

== J ==
- Jack Shark Lake
- Joffre Lakes
- John Hart Lake

== K ==
- Kakiddi Lake
- Kalamalka Lake
- Kamloops Lake
- Kawkawa Lake
- Kennedy Lake
- Kinbasket Lake
- Kinney Lake
- Kitkiata Lake
- Kluskus Lakes
- Knewstubb Lake
- Knouff Lake
- Kokanee Lake
- Lake Koocanusa
- Kootenay Lake
- Kostal Lake
- Kotcho Lake

== L ==
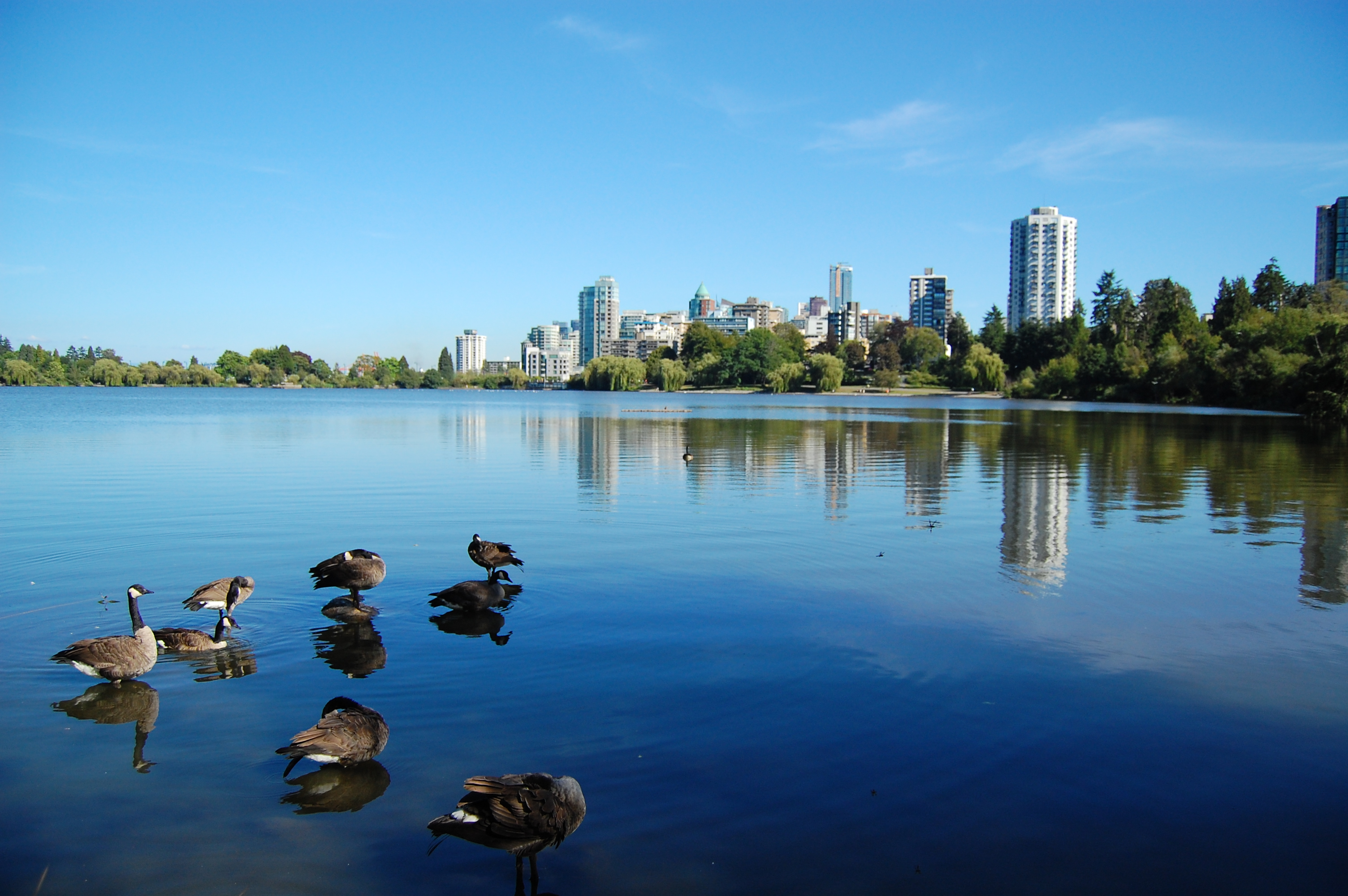
Lost Lagoon in Vancouver's Stanley Park

- Lac des Roches (British Columbia)
- Lac La Hache
- Lafarge Lake
- Lajoie Lake
- Lava Lake
- Lava Lakes
- Lac Le Jeune
- Lightning Lake
- Lillooet Lake
- Lindeman Lake (Chilkoot Trail)
- Lindeman Lake (Chilliwack)
- Little Ball Lake
- Little Lillooet Lake
- Little Shuswap Lake
- Lizard Lake (Juan de Fuca, Vancouver Island)
- Lizard Lake (Vancouver Island)
- Lizard Pond
- Long Lake
  - Long Lake (Smith Inlet)
  - Long Lake (Vancouver Island)
- Loon Lake (Lillooet Land District, British Columbia)
- Loon Lake (Vancouver Island)
- Lost Lagoon
- Lost Lake (Whistler)

== M ==
- Mabel Lake
- Macallan Lake
- Lake Magog
- Mahoney Lake
- Mahood Lake
- Maltby Lake
- Mara Lake
- Marblerock Lake
- Mariwood Lake
- Marsh Marigold Lake
- Martin Lake
- Lake McArthur
- McCombe Lake
- McCoy Lake
- McDougall Lake
- McLeese Lake
- Melita Lake
- Mercs Lake
- Mess Lake
- Meziadin Lake
- Mill Lake
- Moberly Lake
- Monte Lake
- Moose Lake
- Morfee Lake
- Moyie Lake
- Muncho Lake
- Murtle Lake

== N ==
- Nanaimo Lakes
- Nation Lakes
- Nechako Lakes
- Ness Lake
- Nicola Lake
- Nimpkish Lake
- Nimpo Lake
- Nitinat Lake
- Nuttlude Lake

== O ==
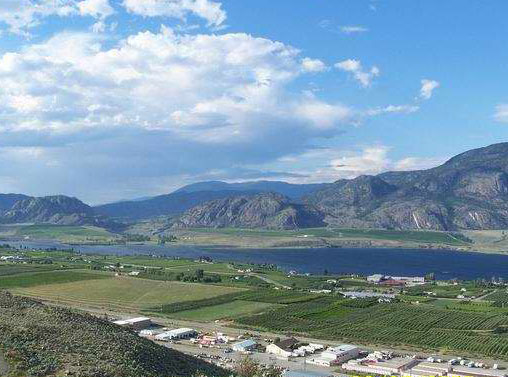
Osoyoos Lake

- Lake O'Hara
- Lake Oesa
- Okanagan Lake
- Opabin Lake
- Osoyoos Lake
- Oshinow Lake
- Otter Lake, British Columbia
- Owikeno Lake

== P ==
- Paterson Lake
- Paul Lake Provincial Park
- Pavilion Lake
- Peak Lake
- Pinantan Lake
- Pitt Lake
- Poum Lake
- Powell Lake
- Puntzi Lake

== Q ==
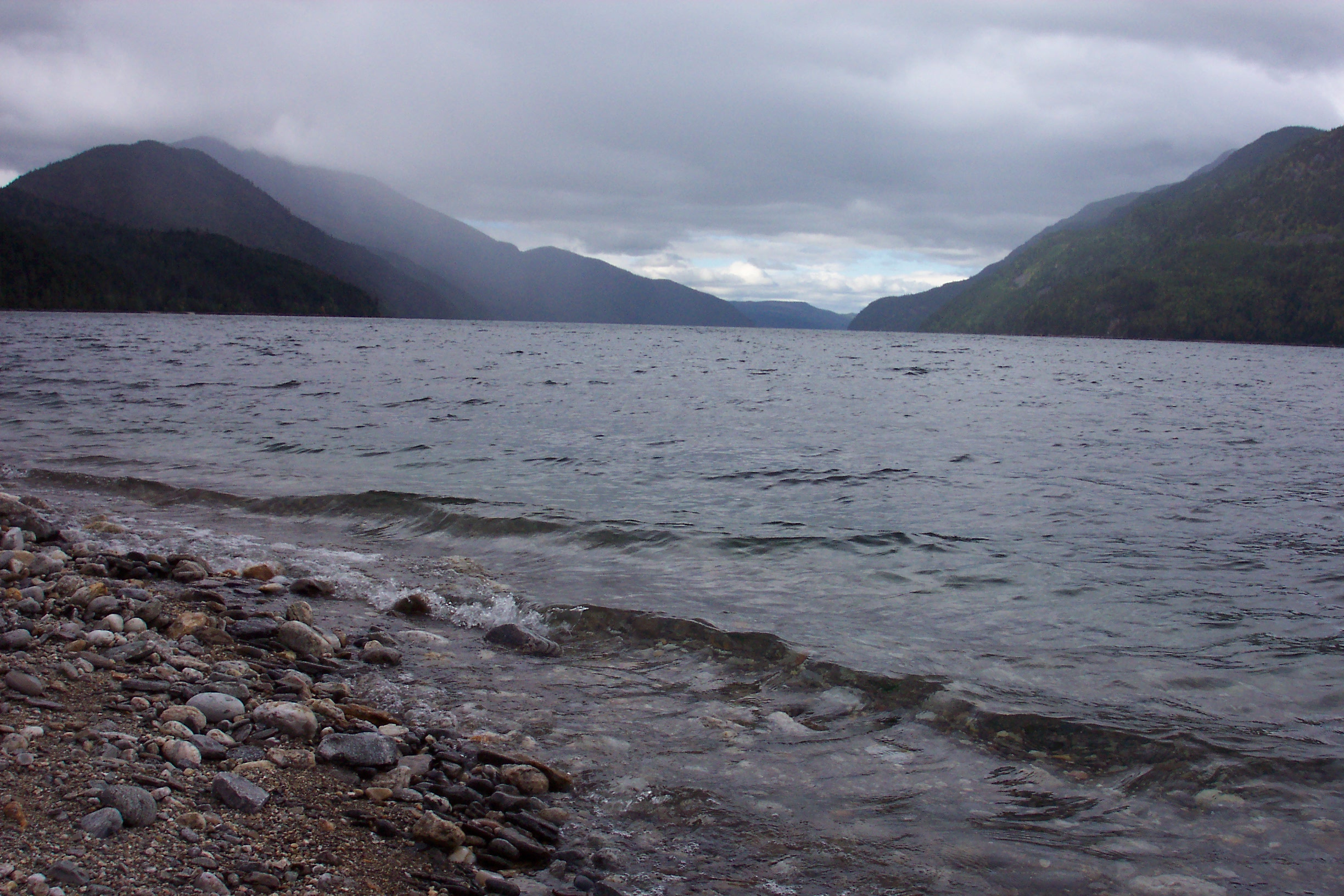
Quesnel Lake - Hurricane Point

- Quamichan Lake
- Quennell Lake
- Quesnel Lake

== R ==
- Ray Lake
- Lake Revelstoke
- Rimrock Lake, British Columbia
- Rolley Lake
- Rose Lake (British Columbia)
- Rose Lake (Bulkley)
- Ross Lake (Washington)

== S ==
- Sasamat Lake
- Scum Lake
- Seton Lake
- Shawnigan Lake
- Sherbrooke Lake
- Sheridan Lake
- Shuswap Lake
- Sikanni Chief Lake
- Silver Snag Lake
- Silvermere Lake
- Skaha Lake
- Slocan Lake
- Somenos Lake
- Somers Lake
- Spider Lake
- Spotted Lake
- Sproat Lake
- Squeah Lake
- Squint Lake
- Stave Lake
- Stawamus Lake
- Stuart Lake
- Stump Lake
- Sulphurous Lake
- Sumas Lake
- Summit Lake
- Sustut Lake
- Swan Lake

== T ==
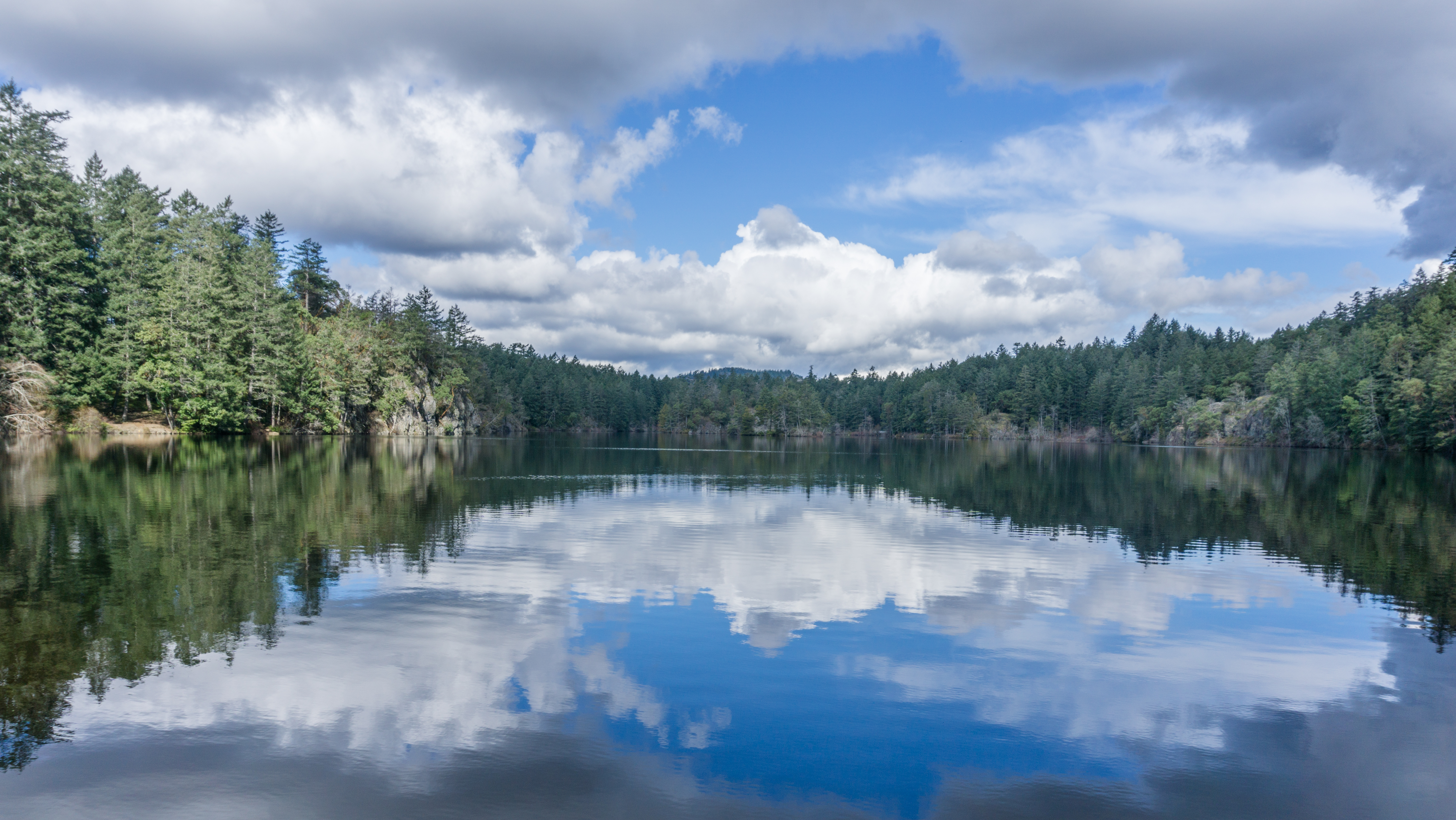
Thetis Lake

- Tagish Lake
- Takla Lake
- Taseko Lakes
- Tatla Lake
- Tatlatui Lake
- Tatlayoko Lake
- Teslin Lake
- Thetis Lake
- Thutade Lake
- Toy Lake
- Trembleur Lake
- Trout Lake
- Tsable Lake
- Tuc-el-nuit Lake
- Tumtum Lake
- Tuya Lake
- Tyaughton Lake

== U ==
- Upper Summit Lake

== V ==
- Vaseux Lake
- Vidette Lake
- View Lake
- Volcano Lake

== W ==
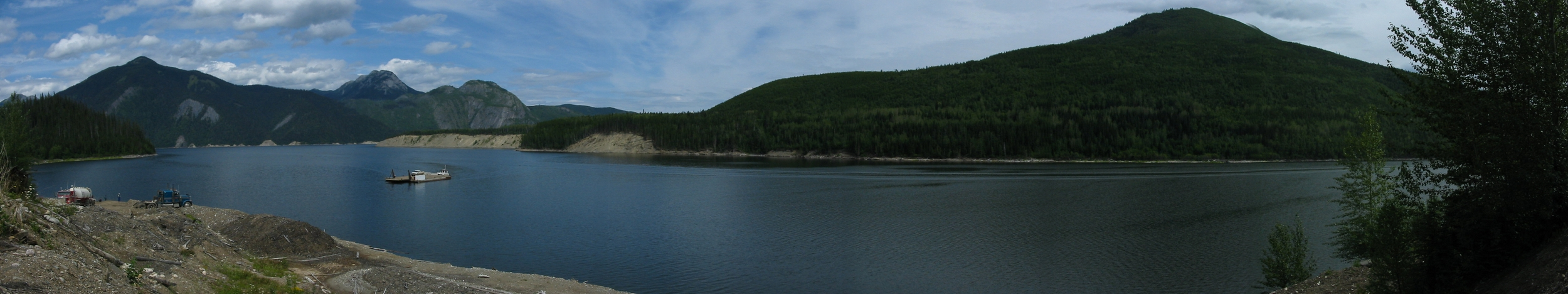
Williston Lake
- Wagner Lakes
- Wahleach Lake
- Wanetta Lake
- Wapta Lake
- Wasa Lake
- Wedgemount Lake
- Wheaton Lake
- Whonnock Lake
- Williams Lake
- Williamson Lake
- Williston Lake
- Windermere Lake
- Wokkpash Lake
- Wood Lake

== Y ==
- Yakoun Lake (Yaaguun Suu)

== See also ==
- List of lakes of Canada
