= Lizard Lake =

Lizard Lake may refer to:

- Lizard Lake (Vancouver Island), a lake located on Vancouver Island in British Columbia, Canada
- Lizard Lake (Juan de Fuca, Vancouver Island), a lake on Vancouver Island, in British Columbia, Canada
- Lizard Lake (Gunnison County), lake in Gunnison County, Colorado, United States
- Lizard Lake (Hants), lake in West Hants, Nova Scotia, Canada
- Lizard Lake (Halifax), lake in Halifax Regional Municipality, Nova Scotia, Canada
