= Spider Lake =

Spider Lake is the name of several places:

- Spider Lake (California)
- Spider Lake (Gogebic County, Michigan)
- Spider Lake (Grand Traverse County, Michigan)
- Spider Lake (Minnesota)
- Spider Lake, Wisconsin
- Spider Lake Provincial Park, British Columbia, Canada
- Spider Lake (Vancouver Island)
