= Rose Lake =

Rose Lake may refer to:

- Rose Lake Township, Michigan
- Rose Lake (Martin County, Minnesota)
- Rose Lake (Pigeon River), in Cook County, Minnesota
- Rose Lake in Mahoning County and Hocking Hills Reservoir in Hocking County, Ohio
- Rose Lake, British Columbia, an unincorporated community
- Rose Lake (British Columbia) (disambiguation), several lakes in Canada
- The Rose Lake, an orchestral work by British composer Sir Michael Tippett

== See also ==
- Lake Rose (disambiguation)
