= Long Lake (British Columbia) =

There are many lakes named Long Lake in British Columbia, Canada.

They are, (in alphabetic order):

- Long Lake (Batchelor), located in the area of the Batchelor Range northwest of Kamloops at 50°46′47″N 120°24′36″W
- Long Lake (Bella Coola), southeast of Thunder Mountain on the upland to the north of the Bella Coola Valley, at 52°30′05″N 126°13′51″W
- Long Lake (Big Bar), located east of Big Bar Ferry west of White Lake at 51°23′45″N 121°56′52″W
- Long Lake (Cassiar), south of Gallic Lake, northeast of McDame Lake, at 59°21′37″N 129°32′42″W
- Long Lake (Cheslatta), located south of Francois Lake near Cheslatta IR No. 1, at 53°57′03″N 125°46′47″W
- Long Lake (Chilcotin), southwest of Williams Lake in the eastern Chilcotin to the north of Riske Creek, located at 52°01′38″N 122°27′22″W
- Long Lake (East Kootenay), northwest of Windermere Lake in the East Kootenay region, at 50°31′24″N 116°06′57″W
- Long Lake (Itcha), south of Itcha Ilgachuz Provincial Park and east of Charlotte Lake, at 52°08′51″N 124°55′40″W
- Long Lake (Kamloops), between Barriere and Adams Lake, northwest of Kamloops, at 51°11′02″N 119°54′17″W
- Long Lake (Ladysmith), at 49°03′14″N 123°47′34″W
- Long Lake (Lillooet Ranges), at 50°07′07″N 122°21′30″W
- Long Lake (Lindeman), at the south end of Lindeman Lake, at 59°45′28″N 135°09′16″W
- Long Lake (Moose Valley), located east of Moose Valley Provincial Park in the South Cariboo at 51°37′59″N 121°36′35″W
- Long Lake (Peace Country), south of the Redwillow River in the Peace River Country, at 54°57′04″N 120°11′48″W
- Long Lake (Pennask), between Peachland (SE) and Pennask Lake (NW), adjacent to the Okanagan Connector, at 49°53′45″N 119°59′39″W
- Long Lake (Port McNeill), located west of Port McNeill and southeast of Port Hardy at 50°36′10″N 127°16′32″W
- Long Lake (Prince George), south of Huble Creek, northwest of Prince George, at 54°08′09″N 121°50′26″W
- Long Lake (Smith Inlet), located south of Smith Inlet at 51°14′03″N 127°08′47″W
- Long Lake (Vancouver Island), northeast of Ladysmith Harbour at 49°03′00″N 123°48′00″W
- Long Lake (Wellington), in the Wellington area of Nanaimo at 49°12′39″N 124°00′54″W
