= Silver Snag Lake =

- Location within Vancouver Island
- Location: Vancouver Island, British Columbia
- Coordinates: 49.530052°N 125.083063°W
- Lake type: Natural lake
- Basin countries: Canada

Silver Snag Lake is a lake on Vancouver Island just east of Tsable Lake and south west of the town of Cumberland.

== See also ==
- List of lakes of British Columbia
