= Quamichan Lake =

Lake in British Columbia, Canada

Quamichan Lake Kwamutsun Xatsa'
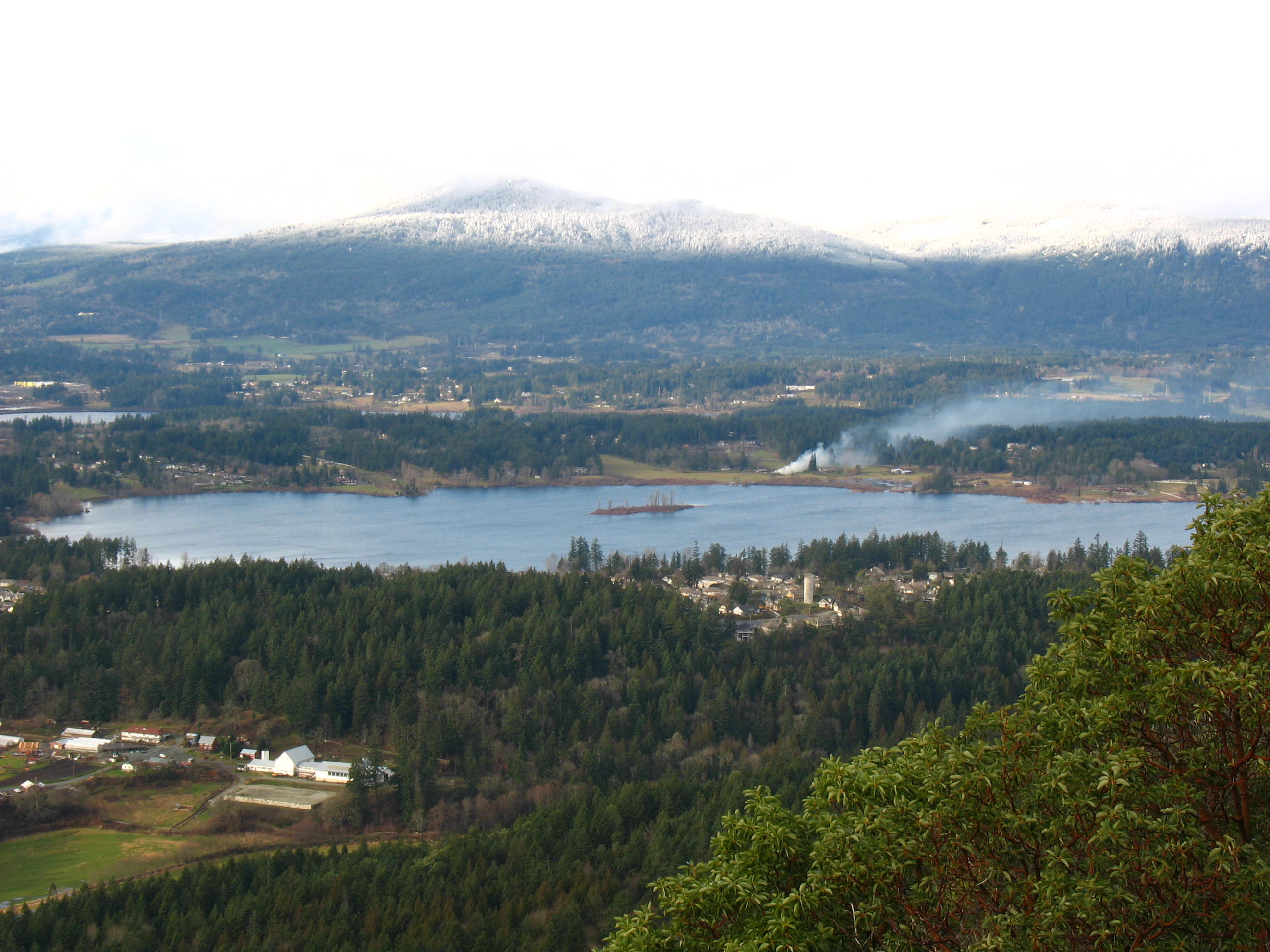
- Aerial view of Quamichan Lake

- Location within Vancouver Island
- Location: North Cowichan, Vancouver Island
- Coordinates: 48°48′05″N 123°39′38″W
- Type: Monomictic lake
- Part of: Cowichan watershed
- Primary inflows: McIntyre Creek
- Primary outflows: Quamichan Creek
- Basin countries: Canada
- Surface area: 313.4 ha (774 acres)
- Average depth: 4.7 m (15 ft)
- Max. depth: 8.2 m (27 ft)
- Shore length^{1}: 8,348 m (27,388 ft)
- Surface elevation: 26 m (85 ft)
- Islands: Rainbow Island
- ^{1} Shore length is not a well-defined measure.

Quamichan Lake is a lake in the Cowichan Valley region of Vancouver Island, British Columbia, Canada, located three kilometres to the northeast of the City of Duncan.

Quamichan Lake and its sister Somenos Lake were created 11,000 years ago by receding glaciers. Both lakes contribute to Cowichan River. Quamichan Lake's outflow is Quamichan Creek which joins with Somenos Creek, the outflow from Somenos Lake, which flows to Cowichan River.

The Cowichan Watershed Board identifies a common set of conditions for both shallow lakes:

- excessive nutrient loading from the farms and homes which surround the lakes
- insufficient "flushing" in summer due to reduced inflows and truncated outflows
- increased plant growth ("algae-blooms"), and
- eutrophication (reduced oxygen as the vegetation decomposes)
- intensified warming

In autumn 2016, the lake's algae received public attention after news coverage of its killing at least four dogs.

== Name origin ==
"Quamichan" was an ogress in the lore of the Cowichan peoples who stole and ate children whose name was adopted by the subgroup of the Cowichan also called Kw'amutsun. Their community was adjacent to the lake.

== Habitat ==
The surface area of Quamichan Lake is 313.4 ha (774 acres) with a maximum depth of 8.2 m (27 ft) and a mean depth of 4.7 m (15 ft). The surrounding watershed for this large, shallow lake is 16.3 km^{2} (6.3 sq mi).

The Cowichan Garry Oak Preserve is located alongside the lake.

The lake is habitat to algae and trout. There are also Pumpkinseed (invasive sunfish) and catfish in the lake. Many migratory birds winter in the lake as it rarely freezes over in the winter.

In 2007 the Quamichan Watershed Stewardship Society ("Quamichan Stewards") was formed by residents and farmers living around Quamichan Lake who were concerned about its degrading condition.

Between 2010 and 2014, about 65,500 trout were added to the lake by a hatchery. In 2014, a trout refuge including 1,500 linear feet of a bubble aeration system was constructed by a collaboration between the Municipality of North Cowichan, the Rotary Club of Duncan, TimberWest Forest Corporation, Woodmere Strata Corporation, Aquatech Environmental Systems and the Quamichan Watershed Stewardship Society. The provision of compressed air addresses a lack of oxygen in late summer caused by demise of algae.

== Residential area ==
Art Mann Park Beach is a municipal recreational park with play areas and a boat launch.

The lakeside residences include some among the highest-priced on Vancouver Island north of Victoria. The Irish Rovers singer Will Millar lives among the lakeside residency.

== See also ==
- List of lakes of British Columbia
