= Lost Lake (Whistler) =

Lake in British Columbia, Canada

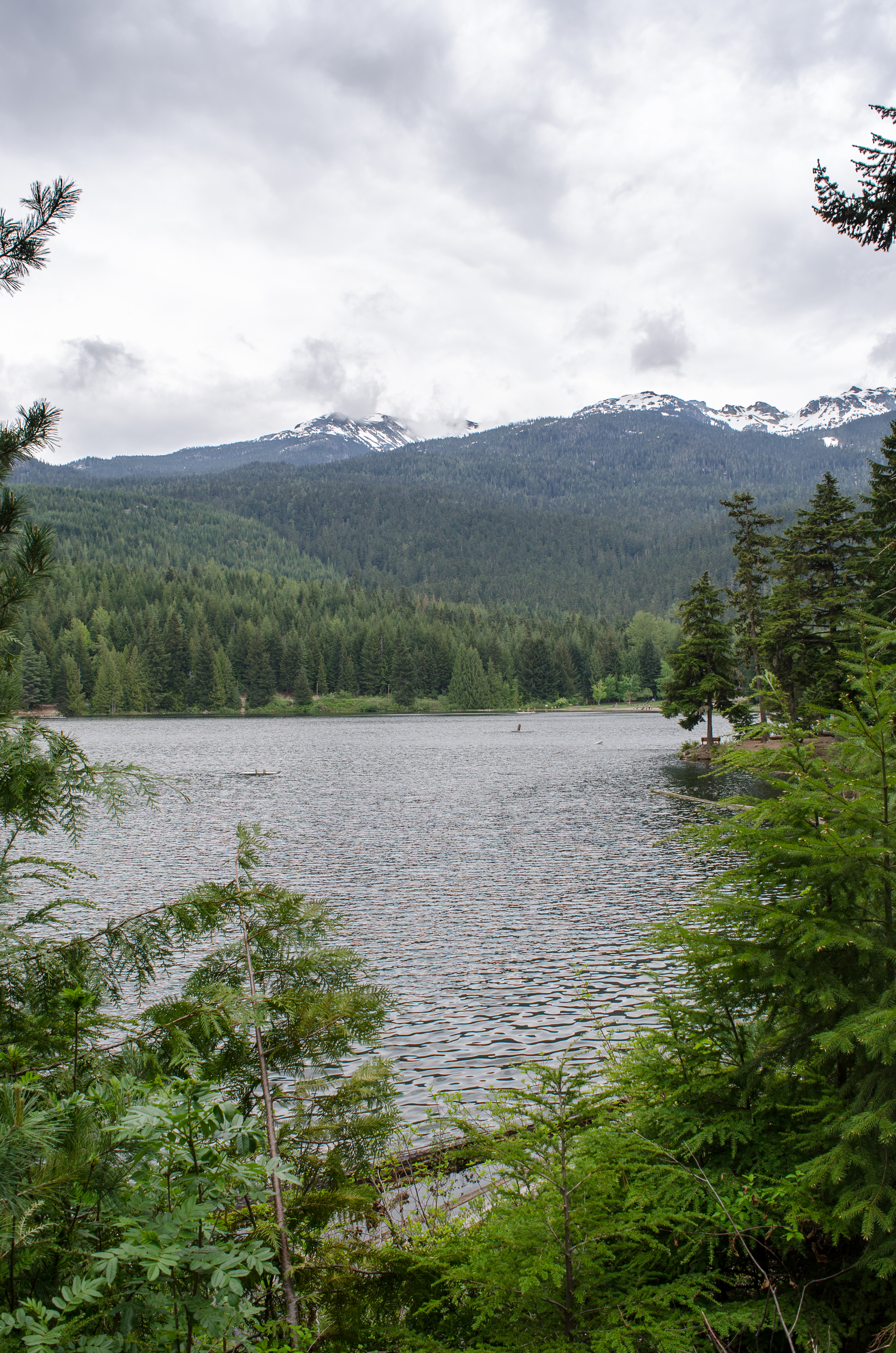

- Location within British Columbia
- Location: Whistler, British Columbia
- Coordinates: 50.12853°N 122.93710°W
- Basin countries: Canada
- Surface area: 167 ha (410 acres)
- Average depth: 8 m (26 ft)
- Max. depth: 23 m (75 ft)
- Surface elevation: 690 m (2,260 ft)

Lost Lake is a lake located in Whistler, British Columbia, Canada. The area around it, Lost Lake Park, is part of the municipal park system's cross-country skiing trails and, until hotel development overshadowed views of the park's swimming docks, was Whistler's long-time nude sunbathing beach. It has multiple public docks, which can be accessed by swimming in warmer months.

== See also ==
- List of lakes of British Columbia
- Alta Lake
- Green Lake
- Thetis Lake
- Wreck Beach
