= Toy Lake (Vancouver Island) =

- Location within Vancouver Island
- Location: Vancouver Island, British Columbia
- Coordinates: 49°39′00″N 125°25′00″W
- Lake type: Natural lake
- Basin countries: Canada

Toy Lake is a lake on Vancouver Island north of Great Central Lake and east of Oshinow Lake.

== See also ==
- List of lakes of British Columbia
