= Loch Ness (disambiguation) =

Loch Ness is a large freshwater loch (lake) in the Scottish Highlands.

Loch Ness may also refer to:

- Loch Ness (film)
- Loch Ness Monster ("Nessie")
  - Loch Ness Monster in popular culture
- Lochness, a 1993 album by Mina
- "Lochness" (song), a song by Judas Priest
- Loch Ness (wrestler), British professional wrestler Martin Ruane, who used the name in WCW in the mid-1990s as a member of the Dungeon of Doom stable
- Loch Ness, an alternative title to British television drama series The Loch

== See also ==
- Ness Lake
- Thea Sofie Loch Næss
