= Ball Lake =

- Location within Vancouver Island
- Location: Vancouver Island, British Columbia
- Coordinates: 49°42′00″N 125°19′00″W
- Lake type: Natural lake
- Basin countries: Canada

Ball Lake is a lake located on Vancouver Island south of Lake Helen MacKenzie on Forbidden Plateau, Strathcona Provincial Park.

== See also ==
- List of lakes of British Columbia
