= Battleship Lake =

- Location within Vancouver Island
- Location: Vancouver Island, British Columbia
- Coordinates: 49°43′31.3″N 125°18′36.6″W
- Lake type: Natural lake
- Basin countries: Canada

Battleship Lake is a lake on Vancouver Island east of Lake Helen Mackenzie on the Forbidden Plateau in Strathcona Provincial Park. It was named Battleship Lake because the discoverer's young son pointed out that the trees on the three islands resembled battleships at anchor.

== See also ==
- List of lakes of British Columbia
