= Rose Lake (British Columbia) =

Rose Lake may be one of three lakes in British Columbia:

- Rose Lake (Bulkley), the eponymous waterbody adjacent to the community of Rose Lake in the Bulkley Valley region of the province's northwest.
- Rose Lake (Cariboo), a lake northeast of the City of Williams Lake in the Cariboo region.
- Rose Lake (Maple Ridge), a lake in the UBC Research Forest north of the District of Maple Ridge

== See also ==
- List of lakes of British Columbia
- Rose Lake (disambiguation)
