= Mount Davis =

Mount Davis may refer to:

== Places ==
=== United States ===
- Mount Davis (Yavapai County, Arizona), near Mount Union
- Mount Davis (California)
- Mount Davis (New Hampshire)
- Mount Davis (Pennsylvania), highest point in Pennsylvania

=== Elsewhere ===
- Mount Davis (Antarctica)
- Mount Davis (British Columbia), Canada
- Mount Davis, Hong Kong, a hill in Kennedy Town, Hong Kong Island

=== Other uses ===
- Mount Davis (Oakland), a section of seats at the Oakland Coliseum in Oakland, California

== See also ==
- Davis Mountains, Texas
- Davis Peak (disambiguation)
