= View Lake (Vancouver Island) =

- Location within Vancouver Island
- Location: Vancouver Island, British Columbia
- Coordinates: 49°23′01″N 125°21′28″W
- Lake type: Natural lake
- Basin countries: Canada

View Lake is a lake located on Vancouver Island east of the west end of Great Central Lake.

== See also ==
- List of lakes of British Columbia
