= Divers Lake =

- Location within Vancouver Island
- Location: Vancouver Island, British Columbia
- Coordinates: 49°44′00″N 125°21′30″W
- Lake type: Natural lake
- Basin countries: Canada

Divers Lake is a lake on Vancouver Island, British Columbia, Canada on the north side of Forbidden Plateau in Strathcona Provincial Park.

== See also ==
- List of lakes of British Columbia
