= Davis Peak =

Davis Peak may refer to:

- Davis Peak (Washington) in the North Cascades
- Davis Peak (British Columbia) in the Monashee Mountains
- Jeff Davis Peak, a variant name of Doso Doyabi near Wheeler Peak (Nevada)

== See also ==
- Mount Davis (disambiguation)
