= Greig Lake (Vancouver Island) =

- Location within Vancouver Island
- Location: Vancouver Island, British Columbia
- Coordinates: 49°39′00″N 125°38′00″W
- Lake type: Natural lake
- Basin countries: Canada

Greig Lake is a lake on Vancouver Island west of Buttle Lake in Strathcona Provincial Park.

== See also ==
- List of lakes of British Columbia
