= Macallan Lake =

- Location within Vancouver Island
- Location: Vancouver Island, British Columbia
- Coordinates: 49°05′35.5″N 125°38′01.9″W
- Lake type: Natural lake
- Basin countries: Canada

Macallan Lake is a lake located on Vancouver Island west of Kennedy Lake and south of Kennedy River.

== See also ==
- List of lakes of British Columbia
