= Wagner Lakes =

- Location within Vancouver Island
- Location: Vancouver Island, British Columbia
- Coordinates: 49°40′31″N 125°13′30″W
- Lake type: Natural lake
- Basin countries: Canada

The Wagner Lakes are lakes located on Vancouver Island at the south end of the Forbidden Plateau.

== See also ==
- List of lakes of British Columbia
