= Kotcho Lake =

Lake in British Columbia, Canada

- Location within British Columbia
- Coordinates: 59.06816°N 121.14950°W
- Primary inflows: Kotcho River
- Basin countries: Canada
- Max. length: 12 km (7.5 mi)
- Max. width: 8 km (5.0 mi)
- Surface elevation: 620 m (2,030 ft)

Kotcho Lake is a lake in north-eastern British Columbia, Canada.

It is located 150 kilometers (93 mi) east of Fort Nelson, in the Greater Sierra Oil Field, at an elevation of 620 meters (2,030 ft). It is recognized as a Canadian Important Bird Area.

The Kotcho Lake Village Site Provincial Park is located on the southern shore of the lake.

The lake is located in muskeg tundra, in the Etsho Plateau, a region dominated by white spruce and black spruce. It is fed by the Kotcho River as well as several creeks. It is drained at the southern end by the Kotcho River, a tributary of the Hay River.

== See also ==
- List of lakes of British Columbia
