= Granite Lake (Powell River) =

Lake in British Columbia, Canada

- Location within British Columbia
- Location: British Columbia
- Coordinates: 49°52′56″N 124°22′12″W
- Basin countries: Canada

Granite Lake is a small lake in the Pacific Ranges of the Coast Mountains in southwestern British Columbia, Canada. It is located 12 km (7.5 mi) east-northeast of the city of Powell River in New Westminster Land District. It lies west of the south end of Horseshoe Lake.

== See also ==
- List of lakes of British Columbia
