= Croteau Lake =

- Location within Vancouver Island
- Location: Vancouver Island, British Columbia
- Coordinates: 49°42′00″N 125°19′00″W
- Lake type: Natural lake
- Basin countries: Canada

Croteau Lake is a lake at the head of Browns River on the Forbidden Plateau on Vancouver Island.

== See also ==
- List of lakes of British Columbia
