= Williamson Lake =

Lake in British Columbia, Canada

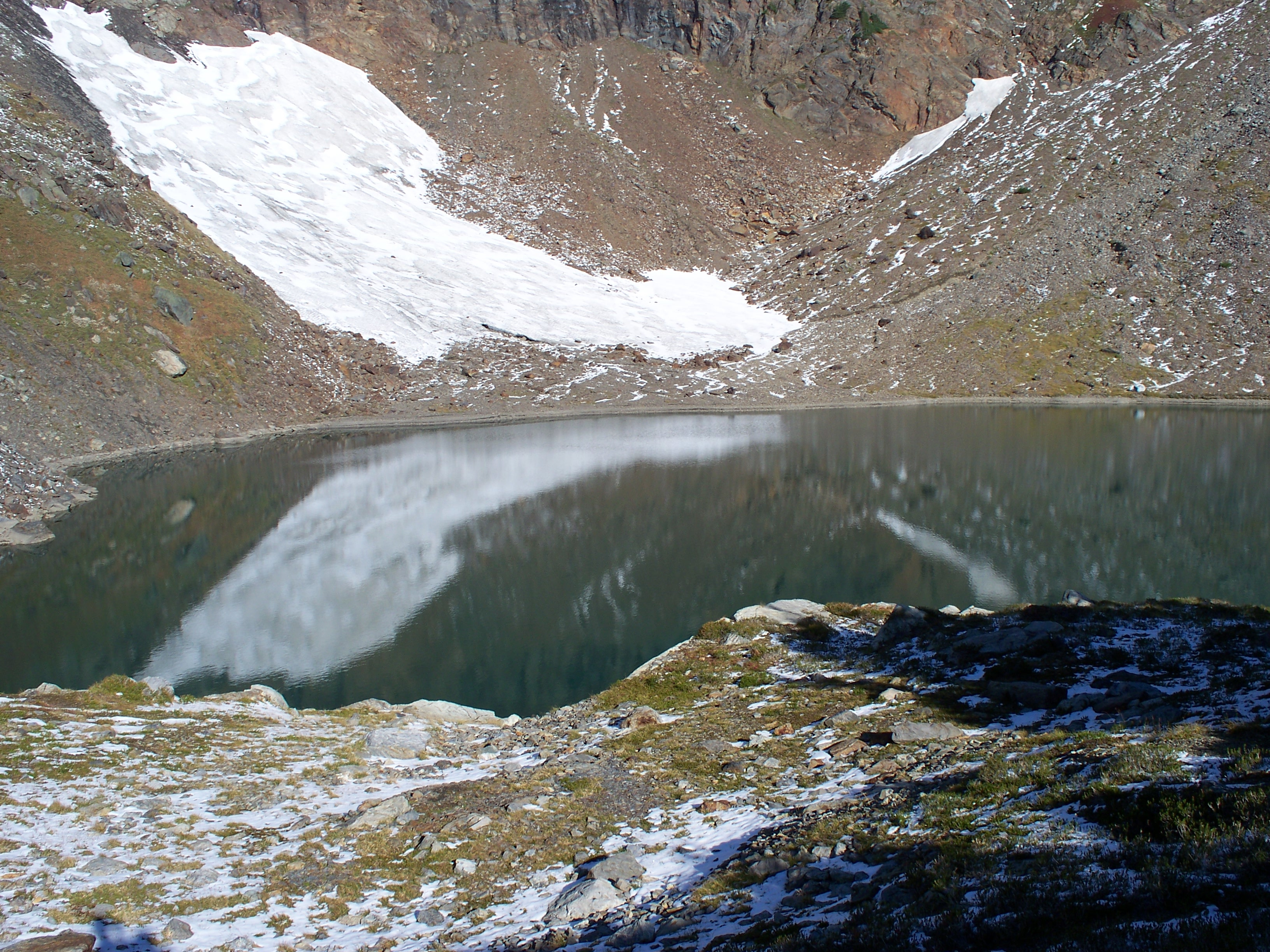
- (October 2008)

- Location within British Columbia
- Location: British Columbia, Canada
- Coordinates: 49.1505°N 121.5960°W
- Surface elevation: 1,655 m (5,430 ft)

Williamson Lake is a small mountain lake located below Welch Peak, near Chilliwack, British Columbia, Canada. It can be accessed by two different hiking trails, one 4 kilometers and the other 13 kilometers in length.

== See also ==
- List of lakes of British Columbia
