= 101 Mile Lake =

Lake in British Columbia, Canada

- Location within British Columbia Location within Canada
- Location: 100 Mile House, British Columbia
- Coordinates: 51.6677°N 121.2934°W
- Primary inflows: None
- Primary outflows: None
- Basin countries: Canada
- Settlements: None

101 Mile Lake is a small lake located near the town of 100 Mile House, British Columbia. Like the town, the lake is named because of its distance from Lillooet via the Old Cariboo Road.

== See also ==
- List of lakes of British Columbia
