= Paterson Lake =

Lake on Vancouver Island

- Location within Vancouver Island
- Location: Vancouver Island, British Columbia
- Coordinates: 50°04′00″N 125°39′00″W
- Lake type: Natural lake
- Basin countries: Canada

Paterson Lake is a lake located on Vancouver Island east of Salmon River, south west of Brewster Lake.

== See also ==
- List of lakes of British Columbia
