= Bolton Lake (British Columbia) =

Lake in British Columbia, Canada

- Location within British Columbia
- Location: Strathcona Regional District, British Columbia
- Coordinates: 49°46′59″N 126°25′00″W
- Primary outflows: Unnamed creek to Nesook Bay on Tlupana Inlet
- Basin countries: Canada
- Max. length: 1.2 km (0.75 mi)
- Max. width: 0.35 km (0.22 mi)
- Surface elevation: 127 m (417 ft)

Bolton Lake is a lake in the Pacific Ocean drainage basin on the west coast of Vancouver Island in Strathcona Regional District, British Columbia, Canada. It is about 1,200 metres (3,937 ft) long and 350 metres (1,148 ft) wide, and lies at an elevation of 127 metres (417 ft). The primary outflow is an unnamed creek to Nesook Bay on the Tlupana Inlet of the Pacific Ocean.

== See also ==
- List of lakes of British Columbia
