= Somers Lake =

- Location within Vancouver Island
- Location: Vancouver Island, British Columbia
- Coordinates: 49°21′25″N 124°59′20″W
- Lake type: Natural lake
- Basin countries: Canada

Somers Lake is a lake located on Vancouver Island south west of the junction of Stamp River and Ash River.

== See also ==
- List of lakes of British Columbia
