= Cecil Lake =

- Unincorporated community
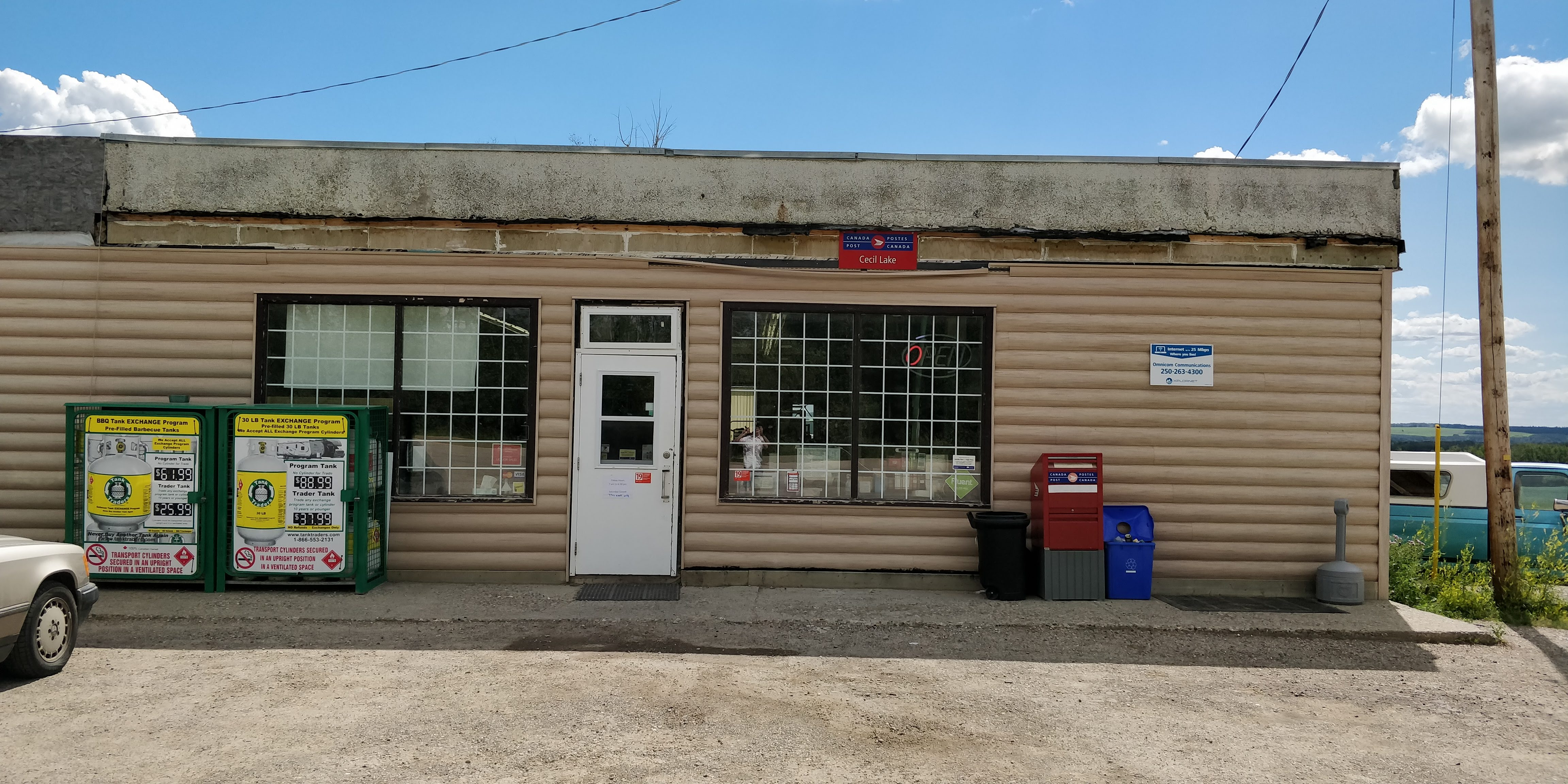
- Store and post office

- Location within Peace River Regional District Location within British Columbia
- Coordinates: 56°18′00″N 120°35′00″W
- Country: Canada
- Province: British Columbia
- Federal riding: Prince George—Peace River—Northern Rockies
- Provincial riding: Peace River North
- Postal code: V0C 1G0

Cecil Lake is a settlement in British Columbia.

Cecil Lake is a farming community 20 minutes east of Fort Saint John. It was made available for homesteading during the 1930s; many families settled in the area during that time. The land was cleared for farming, roads, houses, schools and churches were also built at that time. The area was considered remote because of the poor roads then. A road and bridge across the Beatton River existed through the 1950s and 60s. Due to problems with the banks of the river sliding the road was relocated and the bridge replaced with two bridges in the 1990s. As of 2013 Cecil Lake has two churches, a post office/general store, and a community hall.

== Name origin ==
The community is named after the nearby Cecil Lake, which was believed to have been named in 1910 for Cecil Morton Roberts, who was chief draughtsman at the Surveyor-General's Branch of the British Columbia Department of Lands in 1910.
