= Evans Lake (British Columbia) =

Lake in British Columbia, Canada

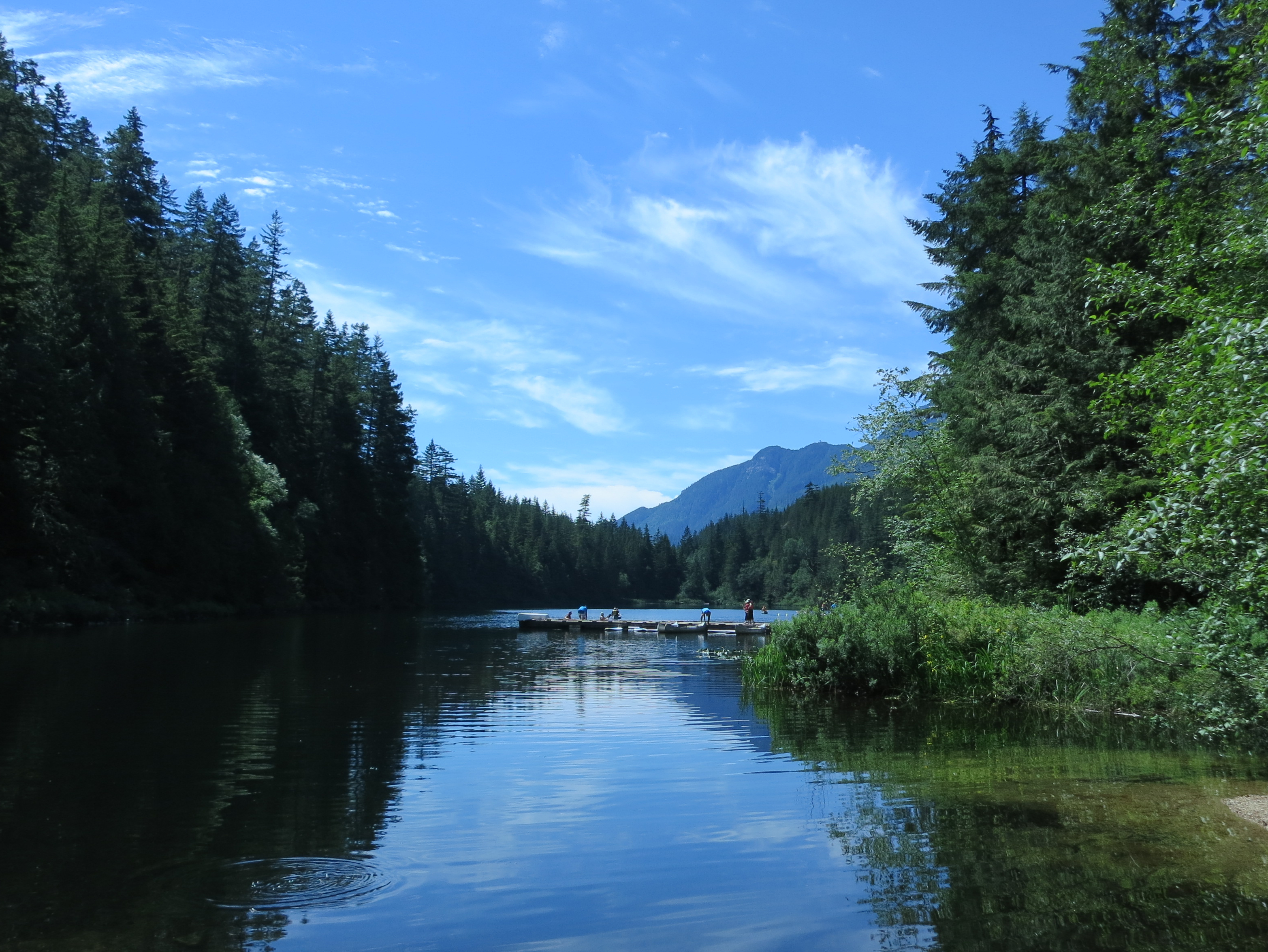

- Location within British Columbia
- Location: Brackendale, British Columbia
- Coordinates: 49°48′42.4″N 123°10′23.8″W
- Basin countries: Canada
- Max. depth: 24 m (79 ft)
- Shore length^{1}: 1.3 km (0.81 mi)
- ^{1} Shore length is not a well-defined measure.

Evans Lake is a small, roughly triangular lake having a perimeter of about 1.3 kilometers, on the rise between the Cheakamus and Squamish Rivers in British Columbia, Canada. The 604-acre (2.44 km^{2}) site has been home to youth camps since 1959. For decades Evans Lake was used primarily by the Junior Forest Wardens of BC. Later, the BC Forestry Association ran summer camps for children.

The summer program is a combination of ecology-based educational time and structured and unstructured leisure time. During the school year, the Evans Lake Forest Education Center offers schools, community groups, businesses and private parties independent and program-based activities at Evans Lake forest and camp.

== See also ==
- List of lakes of British Columbia
