= Lizard Pond =

- Location within Vancouver Island
- Location: Vancouver Island, British Columbia
- Coordinates: 49°04′00″N 124°47′00″W
- Type: Natural lake
- Basin countries: Canada

Lizard Pond is a lake located on Vancouver Island, Canada, southeast of Hiwatchas Mountain.

== See also ==
- List of lakes of British Columbia
