= Consinka Lake =

- Location within Vancouver Island
- Location: Vancouver Island, British Columbia
- Coordinates: 48°57′00″N 124°58′00″W
- Lake type: Natural lake
- Basin countries: Canada

Consinka Lake is a lake located on Vancouver Island is an expansion of Consinka Creek east of San Mateo Bay.

== See also ==
- List of lakes of British Columbia
