= Wheaton Lake =

- Location within Vancouver Island
- Location: Vancouver Island, British Columbia
- Coordinates: 49°41′35.0″N 125°38′01.2″W
- Lake type: Natural lake
- Basin countries: Canada

Wheaton Lake is a lake located on Vancouver Island west of Marble Peak on the south side of Buttle Lake in Strathcona Provincial Park.

== See also ==
- List of lakes of British Columbia
