= Mariwood Lake =

- Location within Vancouver Island
- Location: Vancouver Island, British Columbia
- Coordinates: 49°41′38.9″N 125°20′09.0″W
- Lake type: Natural lake
- Basin countries: Canada

Mariwood Lake is a lake on Vancouver Island north east of Moat Lake on Forbidden Plateau, Strathcona Provincial Park,

== See also ==
- List of lakes of British Columbia
