= Loon Lake (Vancouver Island) =

Lake in British Columbia, Canada

- Location within Vancouver Island
- Location: Vancouver Island, British Columbia
- Coordinates: 49°15′11.26″N 124°42′0.06″W
- Lake type: Natural lake
- Basin countries: Canada

Loon Lake is a lake on Vancouver Island that is north of Mount Arrowsmith and east of Port Alberni. Access is from Highway 4.

== See also ==
- List of lakes of British Columbia
