= 108 Mile Lake =

Lake in British Columbia, Canada

- Location of the lake in British Columbia 108 Mile Lake (Canada)
- Location: 108 Mile Ranch, British Columbia
- Coordinates: 51.743°N 121.361°W
- Lake type: Glacial lake
- Primary inflows: none
- Primary outflows: none
- Basin countries: Canada
- Surface elevation: 930 m (3,050 ft)

108 Mile Lake is a glacial lake located in the Cariboo region of British Columbia, Canada. The lake is named after the nearby town 108 Mile Ranch. 108 Mile Lake is connected to Sepa Lake (a smaller lake to the south). The channel between the two lakes was dredged in the late 1980s allowing a free flow of water between the two basins. The lake is a popular fishing, hiking, and mountain biking spot.

== Fish species ==
Fish commonly found in 108 Mile Lake include rainbow trout, bull trout, redside shiners, northern pikeminnows, suckers and coastal cutthroat trout.

== See also ==
- List of lakes of British Columbia
