= Angora Lake =

Lake in British Columbia, Canada

- Location within Vancouver Island
- Location: Vancouver Island, British Columbia
- Coordinates: 49°05′26″N 125°32′05″W
- Lake type: Natural lake
- Basin countries: Canada

Angora Lake is a lake located on Vancouver Island between arms of Kennedy Lake north of Ucluelet.

== See also ==
- List of lakes of British Columbia
