= Poum Lake =

- Location within Vancouver Island
- Location: Vancouver, British Columbia
- Coordinates: 49°33′00″N 125°05′00″W
- Lake type: Natural lake
- Basin countries: Canada

Poum Lake is a lake on Vancouver Island east of south west end of Comox Lake.

== See also ==
- List of lakes of British Columbia
