= Chute Lake =

Lake in British Columbia, Canada

- Location within British Columbia
- Location: Okanagan Mountain Park, British Columbia
- Coordinates: 49°41′40″N 119°31′53″W
- Primary inflows: None
- Primary outflows: Ratnip Creek
- Basin countries: Canada
- Settlements: Chute Lake Resort

Chute Lake is a small lake on the east side of Okanagan Mountain, in the Okanagan Valley in the southern interior of British Columbia. There is one access road, the Chute Lake Road, which is a gravel road connecting Naramata in the south, to Kelowna in the north. Chute Lake can also be accessed via the Kettle Valley Rail Trail from Kelowna or Naramata. The Chute Lake Resort is located on the lake's southwest shore.

== History of Chute Lake ==
Chute Lake was originally called Lequime Lake, named so in 1930. It was renamed Chute Lake in 1955 to conform with established local usage. Chute Lake was nearly hit with the disastrous Okanagan Mountain Park Fire in 2003, with flames coming within metres of the Chute Lake Resort. Fires are common in the region due to the dry climate of the Okanagan.

== See also ==
- List of lakes of British Columbia
