= Tuc-el-nuit Lake =

Lake in British Columbia, Canada

- Tucelnuit Lake, Tugulnuit Lake
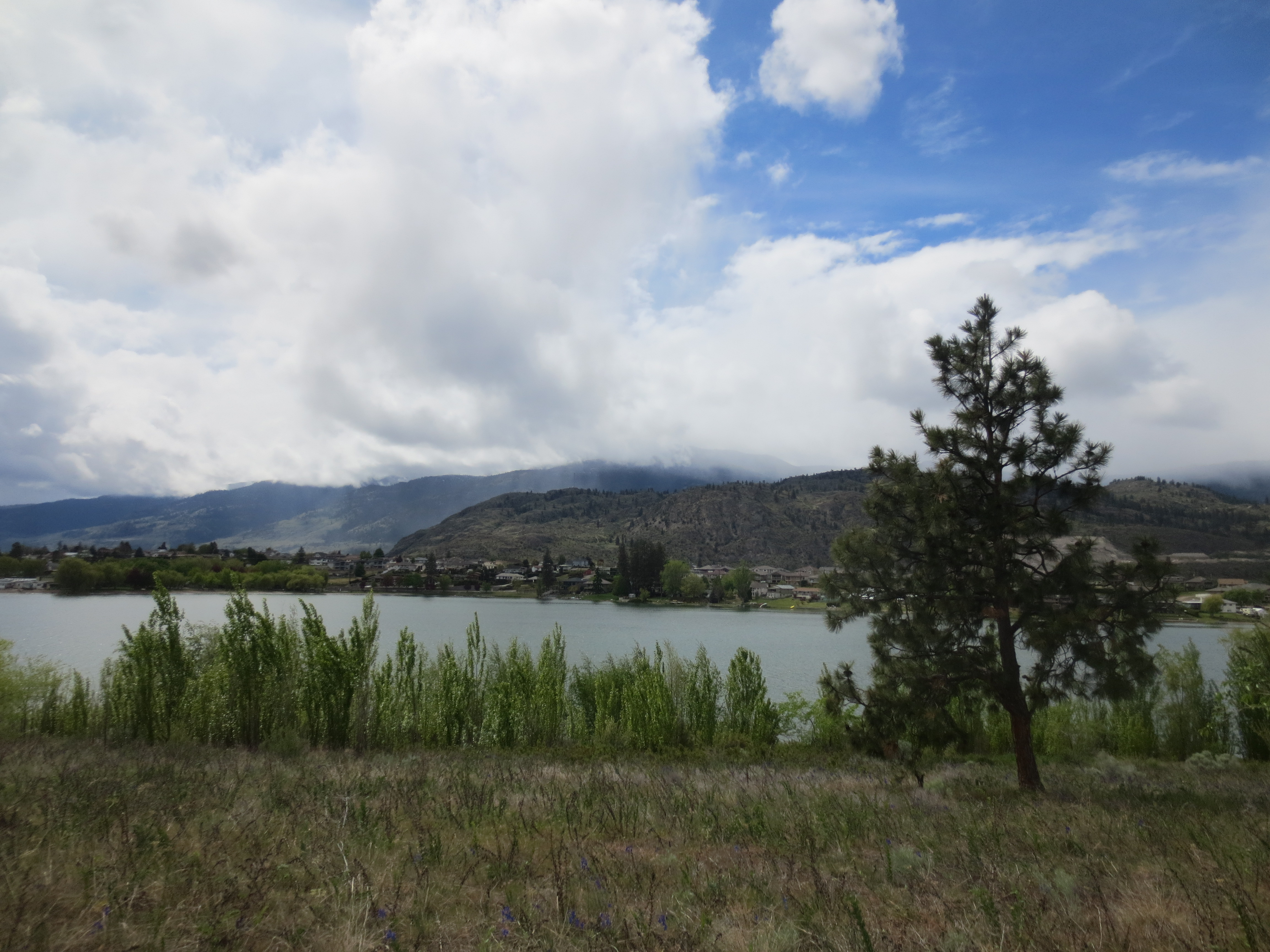
- Looking Southwestward over the Southern end of Lake Tuc-El-nuit on a Spring Afternoon

- Location within British Columbia Location within Canada
- Location: Similkameen Division Yale Land District, Southern Interior of British Columbia
- Coordinates: 49°11′55″N 119°32′25″W
- Basin countries: Canada

Tuc-el-nuit Lake is a lake located in the town of Oliver, in the Southern Interior of British Columbia, Canada.

== Geographical context ==
The lake is a spring fed lake east of the Okanagan River between Osoyoos and Vaseux Lakes.

== See also ==
- List of lakes of British Columbia
