= Knouff Lake (British Columbia) =

Lake in British Columbia, Canada

- Location within British Columbia
- Location: British Columbia
- Coordinates: 50°59′27″N 120°07′20″W
- Basin countries: Canada
- Surface area: 103 ha (250 acres)
- Average depth: 9.8 m (32 ft)
- Max. depth: 24.1 m (79 ft)
- Surface elevation: 1,149 m (3,770 ft)
- Islands: 4

Knouff Lake is a lake located 45 km (28 mi) north of Kamloops at an elevation of 1,149 metres. Access is off the Yellowhead Highway via the Heffley Creek Road, or alternatively via Vinsulla off the Yellowhead Highway, which is located approx 5 km further past Heffley Creek Road. It is a medium sized lake with a large population of moderate to large rainbow trout which are often fished using caddisfly as bait. Knouff Lake is serviced with hydro, phone, year round maintained roads and school bus pickup.

== History ==
James Vincent Knouff settled near Louis Creek in the 1860s, after packing through the Cariboo. He sold out in 1892 to retire in California, but soon returned to Louis Creek where he remained until his death in 1904.

In the early 20th century the entire valley around the lake was logged from shoreline to mountaintop, but it has all grown back forming fir and pine forest with the prior logging almost unnoticeable.

In 2003 the area was evacuated due to the encroaching McLure-Barriere and Strawberry Hill fires. Although the toll of these fires was high on the surrounding areas, their damage was limited to the area surrounding Knouff Lake.

== Local Geography ==
Knouff Lake and Sullivan Lake are two lakes that are joined by a creek, which is one of the spawning channels for the rainbow trout. The two lakes are sometimes known as Big Knouff and Little Knouff.

Sullivan Lake is a clear water lake with a gravel bottom and extensive areas of shoal. There are four islands in the lake, all with ample shoals and weedbeds. Just south of the islands on the eastern half of the lake are several sunken islands covered with weeds which can be visualized using polarized sunglasses.

North of Sullivan Lake is Knouff Lake. This lake is very shallow, having a maximum depth of 5 meters (15 ft). Under normal water levels Knouff Lake is barren of fish due to winterkill. In years with high spring runoff, trout from Sullivan Lake enter Knouff Lake via the spawning channel.

| Game Fish | Rainbow Trout |
| Fish Stocked | Rainbow Trout |
| Angler Usage | Moderate to High |
| Ice Over | November to Early May |

== Resorts & Campsites ==
One resort, Knouff Lake Resort, can be found on the north end of the lake. It has a number of cabins varying in capacity from four to eight people and a large tent/truck camper area immediately to the east of the cabins for those who wish to camp. Situated in the resort is a shower house, general store and boat rental center

Also on the west end of the lake is a BC Forestry Service campsite which is motorhome accessible and has a boat launch.

== See also ==
- List of lakes of British Columbia
