= Cecil Lake (Peace River Country) =

Lake in British Columbia, Canada

Coordinates: 56°20′13″N 120°36′07″W

Cecil Lake is a lake in the Peace River Country of northeastern British Columbia, Canada. It was named in 1910 for Major Cecil Morton Roberts who was Surveyor-General of British Columbia in that year. The community of Cecil Lake was named for this lake and is just south of it.

== See also ==
- List of lakes of British Columbia
