= Wasa Lake =

Lake in British Columbia, Canada

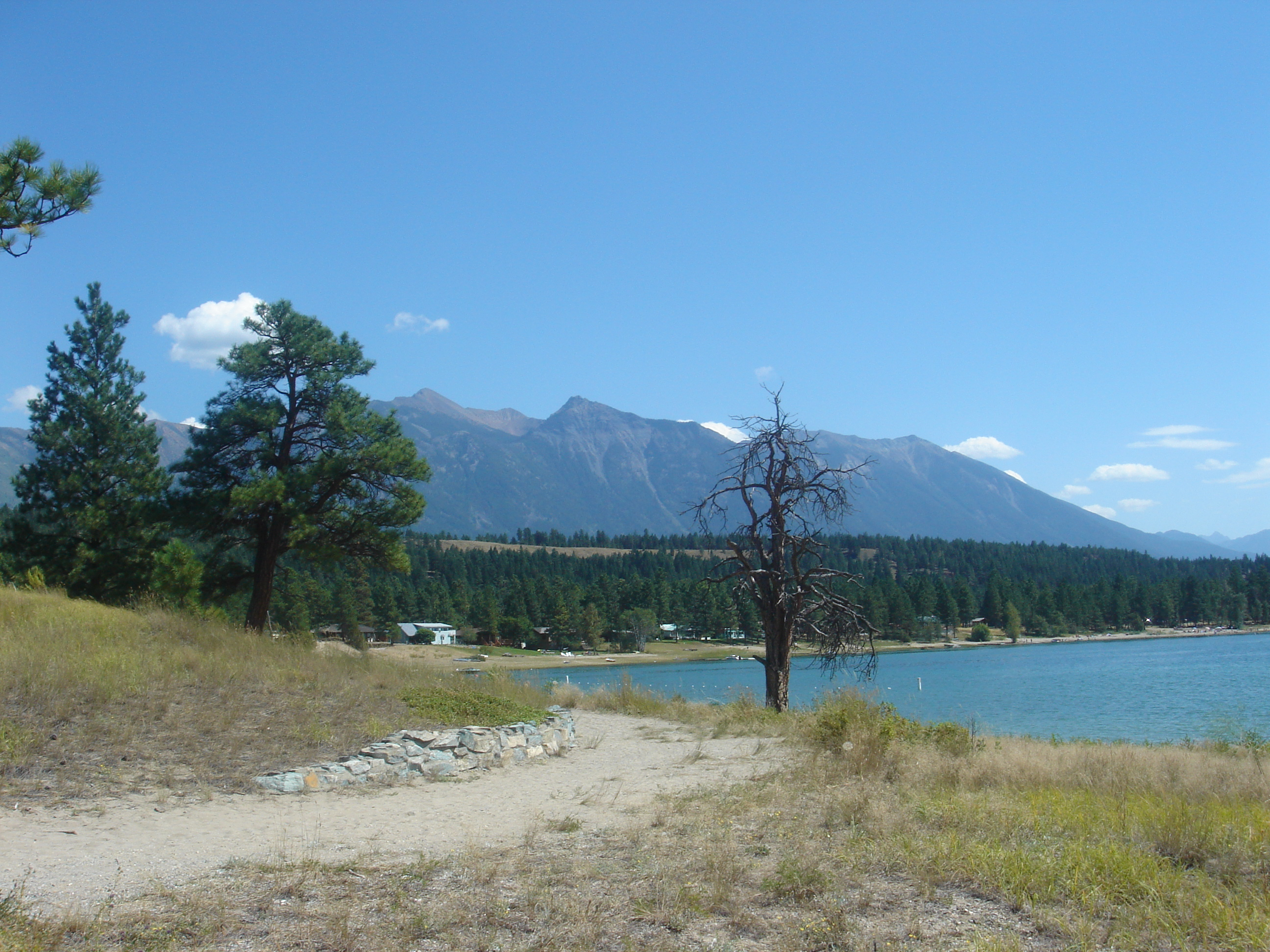

- Location within British Columbia
- Location: British Columbia
- Coordinates: 49.780°N 115.735°W
- Basin countries: Canada
- Surface area: 1.44 km^{2} (0.56 sq mi)

Wasa Lake is a lake in British Columbia, Canada. It has an area of 1.1473 km^{2}. It is 37.5 km north of Cranbrook. Wasa Lake Provincial Park sits at the northern end of the lake. It was named in 1902 after the city Vaasa in Finland. It was formerly known as 'Hanson lake'.

There is an 8 km wheelchair and bike accessible "Wasa Lions Way" trail around the lakeshore as well as a 2.7 km "Forest of the Rainshadow" self-guided interpretive trail that begins at the amphitheatre located in the Wasa Lake campground. This family friendly trail leads up to the Wasa Lake Ridge which overlooks the lake, the Purcell Mountains, the Kimberley ski hill and has a backdrop of the Rocky Mountains.

The lake is reported to be the "warmest lake in the Kootenays" with many popular beaches run by BC Parks. Tourists visit Wasa Lake in the summer for waterskiing, swimming, wind surfing, and fishing. Perch, Pumpkinseed Sunfish and Largemouth bass fishing are available in this freshwater lake.

== See also ==
- List of lakes of British Columbia
