= Inga Lake =

Lake in British Columbia, Canada

- Location within British Columbia
- Location: British Columbia
- Coordinates: 56.615°N 121.641°W
- Basin countries: Canada

Inga Lake is a freshwater lake located in north-eastern British Columbia. It is located between Fort Nelson and Fort St. John on the Alaska Highway. It is at mile 91 of the Alaska Highway, and features a maintained free campsite. Outhouses, and large camping spots are featured as well as quad, and dirt bike trails. It is a popular fishing destination, which is stocked annually with Rainbow trout. A spawning channel project has been underway at Inga since 1997. The purpose of the channel is educational in nature and to prevent diploid (2N) rainbows from becoming spawnbound. Suckers are far and away the most abundant fish in this lake. It is not the easiest spot to find, as only a small green sign indicates its whereabouts.

== See also ==
- List of lakes of British Columbia
