= Cuisson Lake =

Lake in British Columbia, Canada

- Location within British Columbia
- Coordinates: 52.483229°N 122.311645°W
- Surface area: 164 ha (410 acres)
- Average depth: 3.8 m (12 ft)
- Max. depth: 12 m (39 ft)
- Water volume: 6,264,000 m^{3} (5,078 acre⋅ft)
- Shore length^{1}: 9.340 km (5.804 miles)
- Surface elevation: 865 m (2,838 ft)
- ^{1} Shore length is not a well-defined measure.

Cuisson Lake is a lake in the Cariboo Regional District of British Columbia, about 25 miles (40 km) north of the city of Williams Lake. It lies immediately adjacent to Rimrock Lake. It was named after Lewis Cuisson.

Cuisson Lake has a mean depth of 3.8 metres (12 ft), maximum depth of 12 metres (39 ft), and approximate surface area of 164 hectares (410 acres).

== See also ==
- List of lakes of British Columbia
