= 103 Mile Lake =

Lake in British Columbia, Canada

- Location within British Columbia Location within Canada
- Location: 105 Mile House, British Columbia
- Coordinates: 51.685°N 121.299°W
- Primary inflows: None
- Primary outflows: None
- Basin countries: Canada
- Settlements: None

103 Mile Lake is a small lake located near the town of 100 Mile House, in the Cariboo District, in British Columbia, Canada.

Like the town, the lake is named for its distance from Lillooet along the Old Cariboo Road.

== See also ==
- List of lakes of British Columbia
