= Quennell Lake =

Lake in British Columbia, Canada

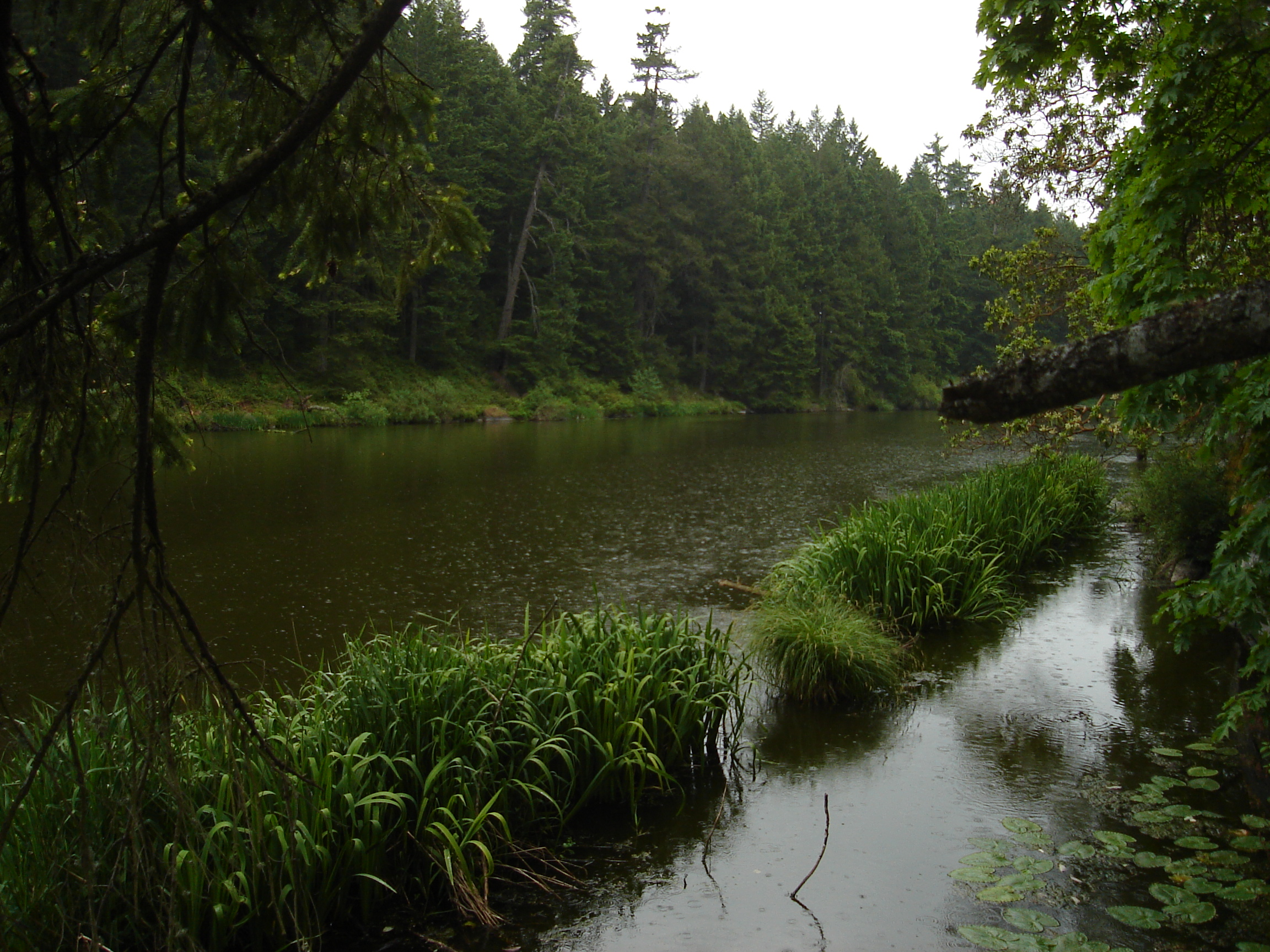
- Shoreline of Quennell Lake, with the island visible across the water

- Location within Vancouver Island
- Location: Vancouver Island, British Columbia
- Coordinates: 49°5′N 123°49′W
- Basin countries: Canada
- Surface area: 1.4 km (0.9 mi)
- Average depth: 3.5 m (11 ft)
- Max. depth: 6.9 m (23 ft)
- Water volume: 4,159,000 m^{3} (146,900,000 cu ft)
- Shore length^{1}: 14,700 m (48,200 ft)
- Surface elevation: 33 m (108 ft)
- Islands: 3,400 m (11,200 ft)
- ^{1} Shore length is not a well-defined measure.

Quennell Lake is a lake located the eastern side of Vancouver Island, British Columbia, Canada. It is located between Ladysmith and Nanaimo in the area of Yellow Point. The lake is used extensively for recreational activities including swimming, canoeing, and fishing. The lake and surrounding wetlands are home to a wide range of birds and mature Douglas fir forest.

== See also ==
- List of lakes of British Columbia
