= Davis Lake (British Columbia) =

Lake in British Columbia, Canada

- Location within British Columbia
- Location: British Columbia
- Coordinates: 49.1072°N 118.8707°W
- Primary outflows: Davis Creek
- Basin countries: Canada
- Average depth: 5 m (16 ft)
- Residence time: 126 days
- Shore length^{1}: 7 km (4.3 mi)
- Surface elevation: 1,154 m (3,786 ft)
- ^{1} Shore length is not a well-defined measure.

Davis Lake is a lake in the Interior of British Columbia. It lies at the head of Davis Creek, just north of the town of Kettle Valley, British Columbia.

Nearby is Mount Davis.

== See also ==
- List of lakes of British Columbia
