= Thetis Lake Monster =

British Columbian hoax

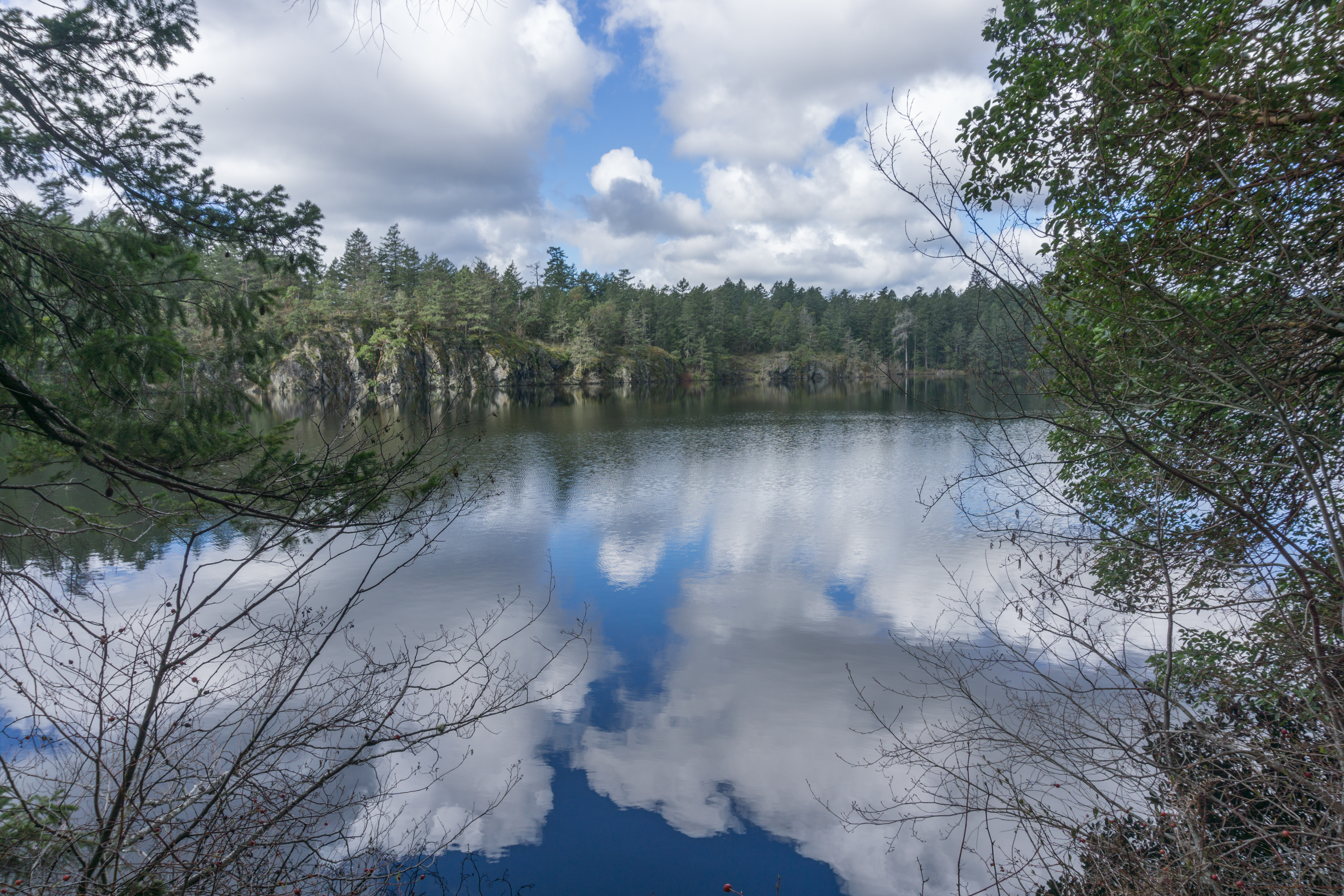
Thetis Lake

The Thetis Lake Monster is a cryptid and admitted hoax of Victoria, British Columbia, Canada. In 1972, two teenage boys claimed to see a monster emerge from Thetis Lake beach. The description of the creature that the teenagers gave matched the description of the Gill-man from the 1954 film Creature from the Black Lagoon.

== History ==
On 22 August 1972, the Victoria Daily Times reported that two local teen boys claimed to have seen a creature with "silvery scaled skin, sharp claws, and spikes on its head" while swimming at Thetis Lake beach in the evening. The newspaper reports described the creature as roughly resembling the Gill-man from the Creature from the Black Lagoon. The Royal Canadian Mounted Police investigated, but could find no evidence. Two other boys fishing on the opposite shore of the lake claimed to have also seen the monster. However, when writer Daniel Loxton contacted one of the individuals years later, he admitted they had fabricated the story to get attention.

Loxton discovered that the boys description of the scaly monster – which specified a sharply pointed head and large, ear-like gills — exactly matched that of the monster featured in the film Monster From The Surf, which had aired on local television a few days prior to the boy's claimed sighting. According to Loxton, "local TV had shown a movie about a scaled humanoid gill-man attacking teenagers at the beach after dark. Four days later, local teenagers reported being attacked at the Thetis beach after dark by a scaled monster".

== See also ==
- Loch Ness Monster
