= Lizard Lake (Juan de Fuca, Vancouver Island) =

Lake in British Columbia, Canada

- Location within Vancouver Island
- Location: Vancouver Island, British Columbia, Canada
- Coordinates: 48°36′22″N 124°13′25″W
- Surface area: 8 ha (20 acres)
- Average depth: 15 m (49 ft)
- Max. depth: 16 m (52 ft)
- Water volume: 654,978 m^{3} (23,130,300 cu ft)
- Shore length^{1}: 1,243.6 m (4,080 ft)
- Surface elevation: 65 m (213 ft)
- ^{1} Shore length is not a well-defined measure.

Lizard Lake is a lake on Vancouver Island, in British Columbia, Canada near the town of Port Renfrew. It is located in the Capital Regional District (not to be confused with Lizard Lake (Vancouver Island), a lake located to the north near the city of Port Alberni). The lake is northeast of the junction of Harris Creek and the San Juan River. Lizard Lake lies at an elevation of 65 metres (213 ft) above sea level and has a surface area of 8 hectares (20 acres). Its mean depth is 15 metres (49 ft) with a maximum of 16 metres (52 ft).

Lizard Lake is located along the Pacific Marine Circle Route to the east of Fairy Lake, and is a popular recreation site for swimming, canoeing and camping. In 2015 a large fire near the lake led to the closure of the highway and burned more than 150 hectares (370 acres) of forest.

== See also ==
- List of lakes of British Columbia
