= Jack Shark Lake =

- Location within Vancouver Island
- Location: Vancouver Island, British Columbia
- Coordinates: 49°40′15″N 125°29′20″W
- Lake type: Natural lake
- Basin countries: Canada

Jack Shark Lake is a lake located on Vancouver Island on the west side of Augerpoint Mountain west of Mount Albert Edward in Strathcona Provincial Park.

== See also ==
- List of lakes of British Columbia
