= Faith Lake =

- Location within Vancouver Island
- Location: Vancouver Island, British Columbia
- Coordinates: 49°39′00″N 125°25′00″W
- Lake type: Natural lake
- Basin countries: Canada

Faith Lake is a lake on Vancouver Island southeast of the headwaters of the Ralph River.

== See also ==
- List of lakes of British Columbia
