= Howard Lake (British Columbia) =

Lake in Cariboo Regional District, British Columbia, Canada

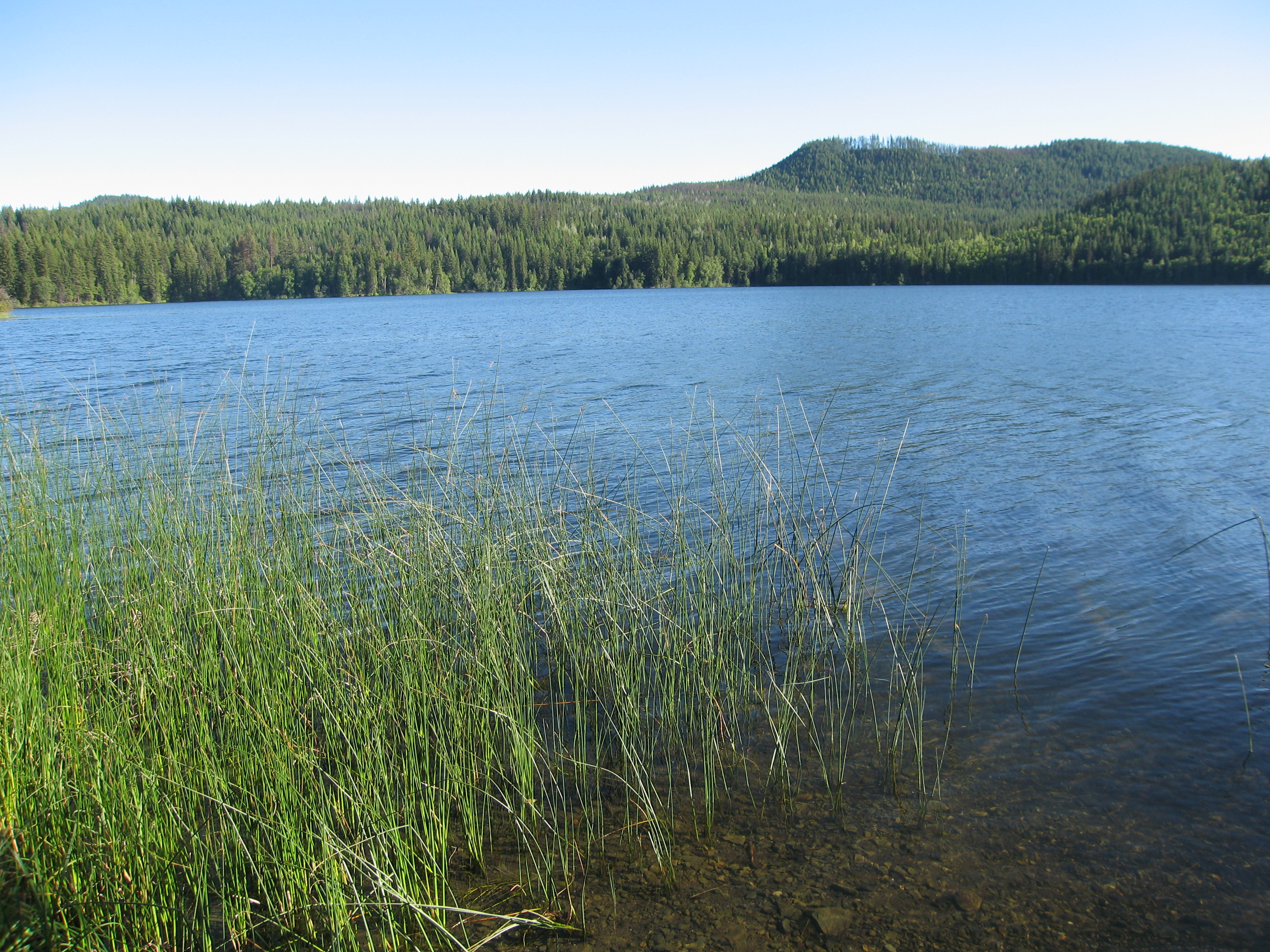

- Location within British Columbia
- Location: Cariboo Country, British Columbia
- Coordinates: 51.814134°N 120.801802°W
- Basin countries: Canada
- Max. depth: 33.5 m (110 ft)
- Surface elevation: 937 m (3,074 ft)

Howard Lake is a lake in British Columbia, Canada. Situated in the hills above Canim Lake, the lake is located at a high altitude and is surrounded by dense forest. It is located approximately 50 km northeast of 100 Mile House.

== See also ==
- List of lakes of British Columbia
