= Brigade Lake =

- Location within Vancouver Island
- Location: Vancouver Island, British Columbia
- Coordinates: 49.2707°N 125.2791°W
- Lake type: Natural lake
- Basin countries: Canada
- Max. length: 620 metres (2,030 ft)
- Max. width: 245 metres (804 ft)

Brigade Lake is a lake located on Vancouver Island west of Sproat Lake.

== See also ==
- List of lakes of British Columbia
