= McCoy Lake =

- Location within Vancouver Island
- Location: Vancouver Island, British Columbia
- Coordinates: 49°16′00″N 124°53′00″W
- Lake type: Natural lake
- Primary inflows: Heath Creek
- Primary outflows: McCoy Creek
- Basin countries: Canada

McCoy Lake is a lake 3.8 miles from Port Alberni.

== Fishing ==
There are a variety of fish including bull trout, striped bass and chinook salmon.

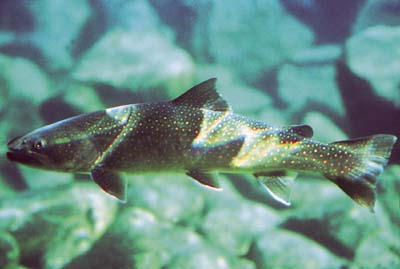
Bull trout

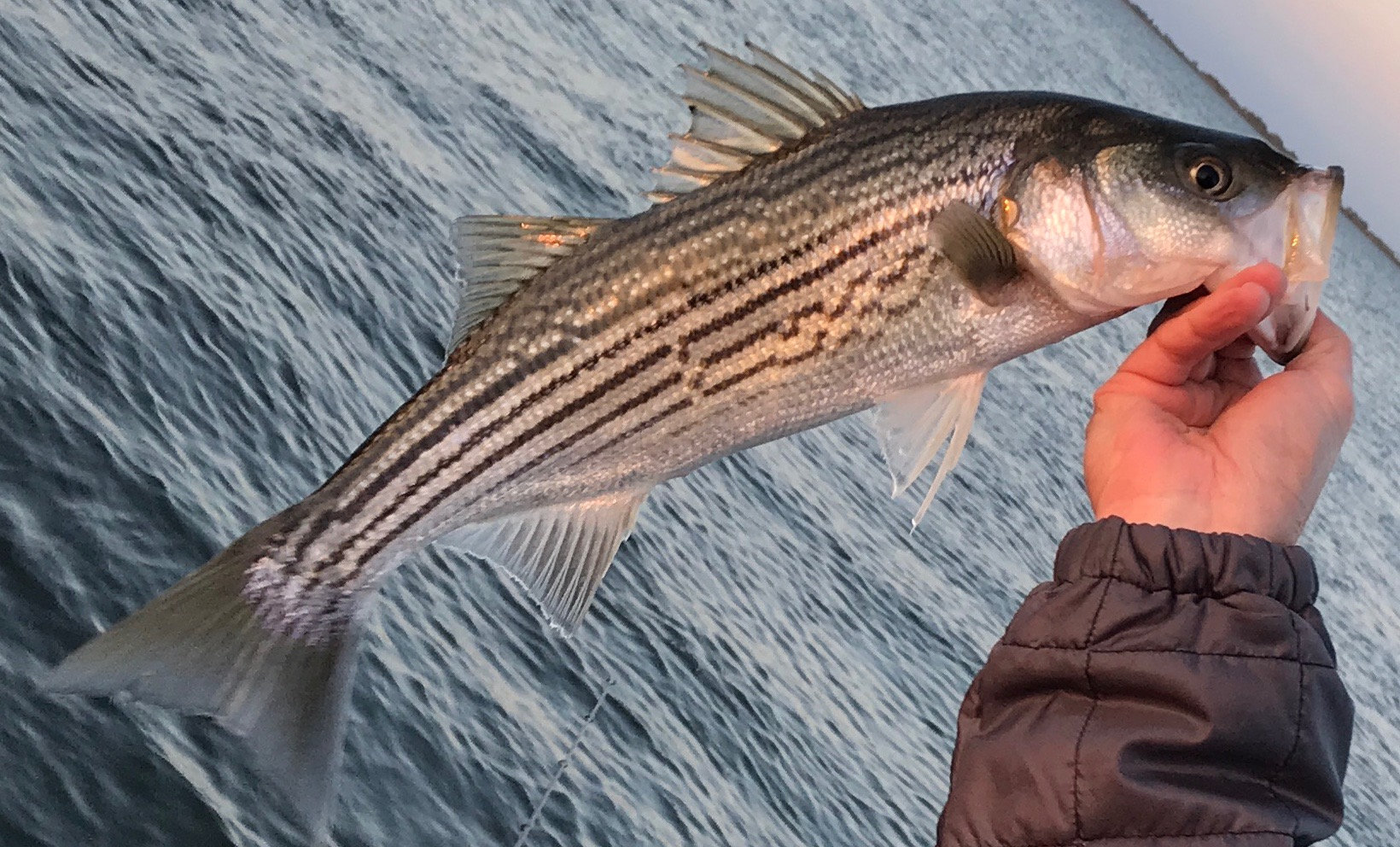
Striped Bass

Striped Bass

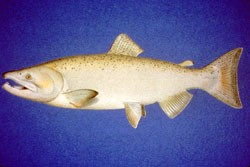
Chinook salmon

== See also ==
- List of lakes of British Columbia
