= Peak Lake =

- Location within Vancouver Island
- Location: Vancouver Island, British Columbia
- Coordinates: 49°09′30″N 124°34′27″W
- Lake type: Lake - Inland body of standing water.
- Basin countries: Nanaimo C, BC, Canada

Peak Lake is a lake located on Vancouver Island south of Cameron River, Dunsmuir Land District. Its feature type is "Lake - Inland body of standing water".

== See also ==
- List of lakes of British Columbia
