= Mercs Lake =

- Location within Vancouver Island
- Location: Vancouver Island, British Columbia
- Coordinates: 49°23′00″N 125°20′00″W
- Lake type: Natural lake
- Basin countries: Canada

Mercs Lake is a lake located on Vancouver Island north of Great Central Lake.

== See also ==
- List of lakes of British Columbia
