= Lake Rose =

Lake Rose may refer to:

- Lake Retba in Senegal
- Lake Rose (Minnesota) in Hennepin County, Minnesota
- Lake Rose (Pennsylvania)

== See also ==
- Rose Lake (disambiguation)
