= Kotcho Lake Village Provincial Park =

Provincial park in British Columbia, Canada

Kotcho Lake Village Site Provincial Park
- IUCN category II (national park)
- Location within British Columbia
- Interactive map of Kotcho Lake Village Site Provincial Park
- Location: British Columbia, Canada
- Nearest city: Fort Nelson
- Coordinates: 59°01′15″N 121°05′07″W
- Area: 0.34 km^{2} (0.13 sq mi)
- Established: June 28, 1999
- Governing body: BC Parks

Kotcho Lake Village Provincial Park is a provincial park in north-eastern British Columbia, Canada. It is located on the southern shore of the Kotcho Lake, 150 kilometres (93 mi) east from the town of Fort Nelson.

The park showcases traditional dwellings of the Fort Nelson First Nation of the Dene Tha. It was established in 1997, and has a total area of 0.3 square kilometres (0.12 sq mi).

== See also ==
- List of British Columbia Provincial Parks
