= Volcano Lake =

Lake in British Columbia, Canada

- Location within Vancouver Island
- Location: Vancouver Island, British Columbia
- Coordinates: 49°47′N 125°54′W
- Basin countries: Canada
- Surface elevation: 1,280 m (4,200 ft)

Volcano Lake, formerly called Crater Lake, is a lake on Vancouver Island, British Columbia, Canada, located just south of Puzzle Mountain and west of Elkhorn Mountain on west side of Strathcona Provincial Park. The name is a misnomer – the lake is the result of glaciation.

== See also ==
- List of lakes of British Columbia
