= Little Lillooet Lake =

Lake in British Columbia, Canada

Coordinates: 50°06′39″N 122°32′04″W

Little Lillooet Lake, historically also Tenas Lake is a lake in the Lower Lillooet Country located to the south of Pemberton, British Columbia, Canada, turning off highway 99 on the FSR to 33 km. along the course of the Lillooet River, which continues southwards beyond it to Harrison Lake. Still formally a separate lake, historically construction of a small dam to enable steamer service to Port Pemberton, which lay at the head of Lillooet Lake, its northern neighbour and parent waterflow, during the construction of the Lakes Route during the Fraser Canyon Gold Rush. "Tenas" or "tenass" in Chinook Jargon means "small" or "child" and was an alternate name for this lake, at the south end of which was Port Lillooet, which connected by the Douglas Road to Port Douglas which was at the head of river navigation from the Strait of Georgia and served as a port for the Interior of British Columbia. The Indian reserve community of Samahquam is located near its southern end at 33 km and further south is the Indian Reserve Skatin at 47 km near the Tsek hotsprings at 44 km.

== See also ==
- List of lakes of British Columbia
