= Hawthorn Lake =

- Location within Vancouver Island
- Location: Vancouver Island, British Columbia
- Coordinates: 49°03′00″N 124°46′00″W
- Lake type: Natural lake
- Basin countries: Canada

Hawthorn Lake is a lake located on Vancouver Island east of Nahmint Bay.

== See also ==
- List of lakes of British Columbia
