= Tsable Lake =

- Location within Vancouver Island
- Location: Vancouver Island, British Columbia
- Coordinates: 49°32′00″N 125°06′00″W
- Lake type: Natural lake
- Basin countries: Canada

Tsable Lake is a lake located on Vancouver Island, Canada, south east of Comox Lake.

== See also ==
- List of lakes of British Columbia
