= Long Lake (Vancouver Island) =

- Location within Vancouver Island
- Location: Vancouver Island, British Columbia
- Coordinates: 49°03′00″N 123°48′00″W
- Lake type: Natural lake
- Basin countries: Canada
- Settlements: Nanaimo

Long Lake is a lake located on Vancouver Island, Canada, northeast of Ladysmith Harbour.

== See also ==
- List of lakes of British Columbia
