= Lake Helen Mackenzie =

- Location within Vancouver Island
- Location: Vancouver Island, British Columbia
- Coordinates: 49°43′00″N 125°19′00″W
- Lake type: Natural lake
- Basin countries: Canada

Lake Helen Mackenzie is a lake on Vancouver Island at the head of Piggott Creek in Strathcona Provincial Park.

== See also ==
- List of lakes of British Columbia
