= Rose Lake (Martin County, Minnesota) =

Lake in the state of Minnesota, United States

- Location within Minnesota
- Location: Martin County, Minnesota
- Coordinates: 43°36′50″N 94°23′16″W
- Type: lake

Rose Lake is a lake in Martin County, in the U.S. state of Minnesota.

Rose Lake was named for the abundance of wild roses near the lake.

== See also ==
- List of lakes in Minnesota
