= Inland Lake Provincial Park =

Canadian provincial park

- IUCN category II (national park)
- Location within Vancouver Island Location within British Columbia
- Interactive map of Inland Lake Provincial Park
- Location: New Westminster Land District, British Columbia, Canada
- Nearest city: Powell River, BC
- Coordinates: 49°57′29″N 124°29′10″W
- Area: 2,763 ha (6,830 acres)
- Established: June 29, 2000
- Governing body: BC Parks

Inland Lake Provincial Park is a provincial park in British Columbia, Canada, on the southeast side of Powell Lake, just to the northeast of the city of Powell River in that province's northern Sunshine Coast region. Inland Lake is located between the south ends of Powell Lake, to the west, and Haslam Lake, to the east.
