= Spider Lake (Minnesota) =

Lake in the state of Minnesota, United States

- Location within Minnesota
- Location: Chisago County, Minnesota
- Coordinates: 45°19′29″N 92°49′18″W
- Type: lake

Spider Lake is a lake in Chisago County, Minnesota, in the United States.

The outline of Spider Lake branches like a spider, hence the name.

== See also ==
- List of lakes in Minnesota
