= Mount Davis (British Columbia) =

Mountain in British Columbia, Canada

Coordinates: 50°6′48.8″N 117°5′4.8″W

Mount Davis is a mountain in British Columbia, north-east of junction of Nicholson Creek and Kettle River and near Davis Lake.
