= Thetis Lake =

Freshwater lake in Victoria, British Columbia

Coordinates: 48.469°N 123.475°W

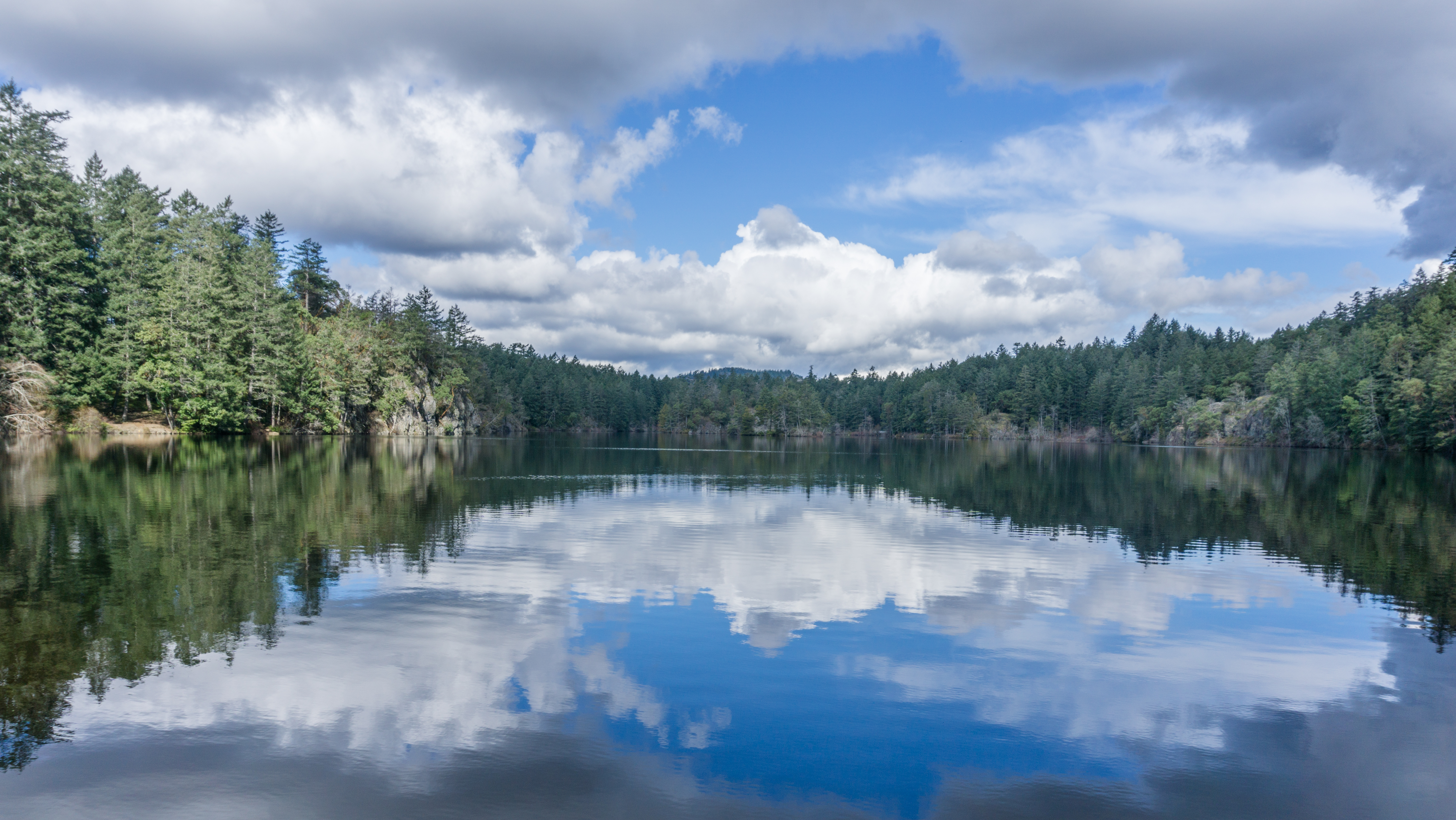
- A view of Lower Thetis Lake

- Location within Vancouver Island Location within British Columbia
- Average depth: 2.8 metres (9.2 ft)
- Max. depth: 9 metres (30 ft)
- Surface elevation: 51.5 metres (169 ft)
- Website: Thetis Lake Regional Park

Thetis Lake is a name that refers to two freshwater lakes (Upper and Lower Thetis) connected by a narrow culvert in the 834-hectare (2,060-acre) Thetis Lake Regional Park outside Victoria, British Columbia, about 12 km (7.5 mi) from the city centre. The lake was likely named for the frigate HMS Thetis, which had been assigned to Esquimalt as part of the Royal Navy's Pacific Squadron. The two lakes are extremely popular as a swimming destination in the summer.

== Thetis Lake Regional Park ==
It was established as Canada's first nature sanctuary in 1958. The park's facilities include several beaches, kilometres of forest trails, parking, washrooms and a change room. The area features many Garry oak and Douglas fir trees.

== See also ==
- List of lakes of British Columbia
- Thetis Lake Monster
