= Moose Valley Provincial Park =

Provincial park in British Columbia, Canada

- IUCN category II (national park)
- Location within British Columbia
- Interactive map of Moose Valley Provincial Park
- Location: British Columbia, Canada
- Nearest city: 100 Mile House
- Coordinates: 51°39′04″N 121°39′05″W
- Area: 25 km^{2} (9.7 sq mi)
- Established: July 13, 1995
- Governing body: BC Parks

Moose Valley Provincial Park is a provincial park in British Columbia, Canada, located in the South Cariboo region 31 km west of 100 Mile House.

Comprising approximately 2,322 ha, it is located to the north of Gustafsen Lake.
