= Oshinow Lake =

Lake in British Columbia, Canada

- Location within Vancouver Island
- Location: Vancouver Island, British Columbia
- Coordinates: 49°27′00″N 125°20′00″W
- Lake type: Natural lake
- Primary outflows: Upper Ash River
- Basin countries: Canada

Oshinow Lake, or Deep Lake, is a lake located north of Great Central Lake on Vancouver Island, British Columbia, Canada.

== History ==
Appearing on maps as early as 1923, the local indigenous name was thought to be from "oshinoweth", meaning "all kinds of game". The Alberni District Historical Society confirmed in 1988 the established local name of the lake was "Oshinow", meaning "deep". Records from the 1930 BC Gazetteer also refer to the lake as "Oshinaw".

== See also ==
- List of lakes of British Columbia
