= Hocking Hills Reservoir =

- Rose Lake
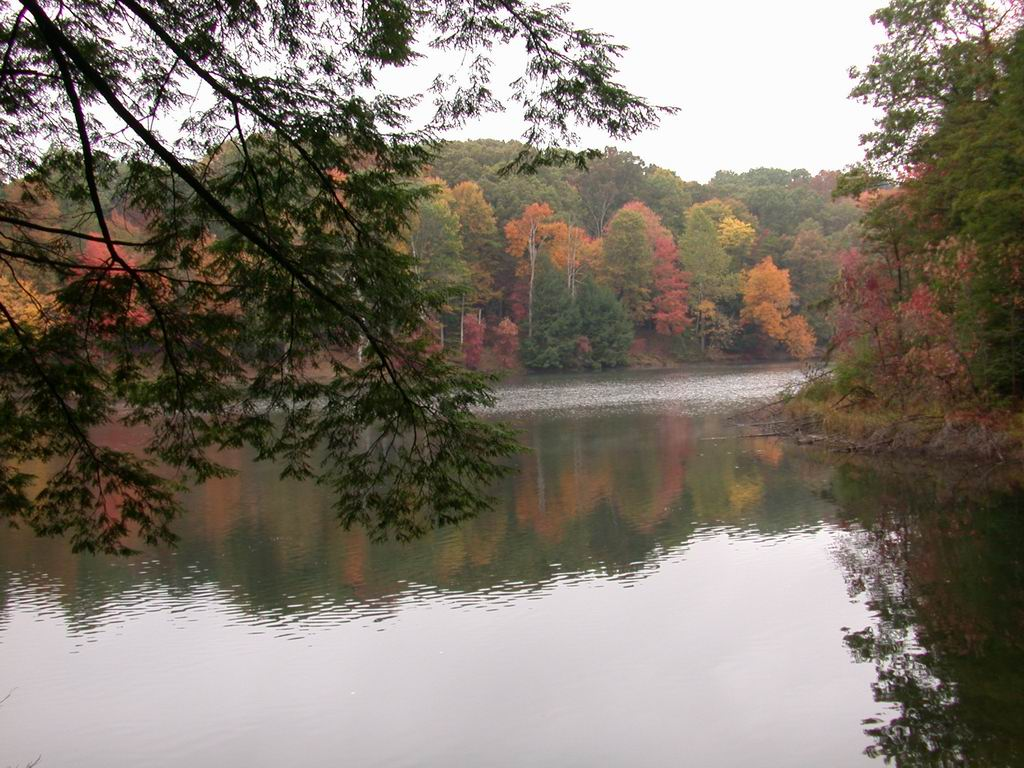

- Location within Ohio Location within the United States
- Location: Hocking Hills State Park, Hocking County, Ohio
- Coordinates: 39°25′30″N 82°32′18″W
- Type: reservoir
- Basin countries: United States
- Surface elevation: 856 ft (261 m)

Hocking Hills Reservoir locally nicknamed Rose Lake is located just outside Old Man's Cave, in the Hocking Hills region of Hocking County, Ohio, United States. It is a part of the Hocking Hills State Park.

== Location ==
It is accessed via the crossing of the Old Man's Cave gorge and following the signs - about a 3 miles (4.8 km) hike. There is no direct road access, though a shortcut may be found via a trail from a primitive campground which borders the lake.

Hocking Hills reservoir is the approximate midpoint of a trail between Old Man's Cave and Cedar Falls. Specifically, it is found on the Upper Gorge Trail.

Hocking Hills Reservoir was formed via the creation of a dam. According to local legend the lake is haunted. Since the park which it is a part of closes at dusk, investigation of said claims is limited to those wishing to stay in the primitive campground, or whom venture in during the day. Regardless, the details, in brief, involve a mother who was looking for her lost child after dark and proceeded to fall off a cliff.

Another "haunting" tail involves the demise of a man who committed suicide in the lake. Fishermen are said to see underwater lights, or a pacing figure on the shore who disappears.

== Rose Hollow valley ==
Rose Hollow is the valley which contains Hocking Hills Reservoir and for which it is locally nicknamed Rose Lake.
	Coord	Elevation:
Mouth:	39°25′21″N 82°32′22″W	761 feet (232 m)
Source:	39°26′9″N 82°31′45″W

== Rose Lake ==
Rose Lake
- Location within Ohio Location within the United States
- Location: Hocking County, Ohio
- Coordinates: 41°4′11″N 80°43′44″W
- Basin countries: United States
- Surface elevation: 1,096 ft (334 m)

Officially, Rose Lake is actually this other lake in Hocking County, Ohio.
