= Ness Lake =

Lake in British Columbia, Canada

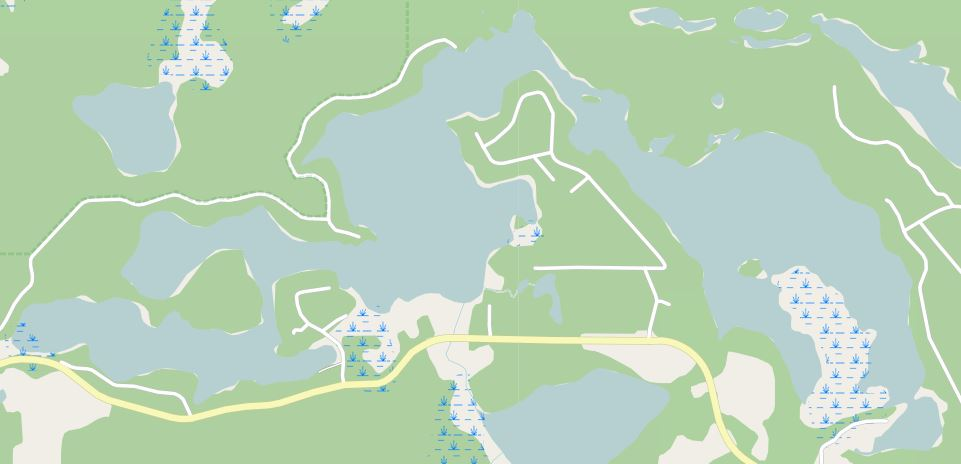
- An overhead view of Ness Lake, via OpenStreetMap

- Location within British Columbia
- Location: British Columbia
- Coordinates: 54°01′30.1″N 123°07′59.9″W
- Primary inflows: Heron Creek
- Primary outflows: None
- Basin countries: Canada
- Max. length: 5.2 km (3.2 mi)
- Max. width: 1.1 km (0.68 mi)
- Surface area: 2.04 km^{2} (0.79 sq mi)
- Average depth: 6.7 m (22 ft)
- Max. depth: 18.3 m (60 ft)
- Shore length^{1}: 18.8 km (11.7 mi)
- Surface elevation: 778 m (2,552 ft)
- ^{1} Shore length is not a well-defined measure.

Ness Lake is a lake in British Columbia's Northern Interior. Located 35 kilometres (22 mi) northwest of the city of Prince George, it is a popular destination for fishing, swimming, water sports and other recreational activities. The lake has a distinctive shape, as it is divided into three larger "basins" (Southwest, Central and East), which are connected to one another via smaller, narrow portions of lake. The Eastern and Central Basins have the greatest amount of development (including Ness Lake Bible Camp and a public beach). Meanwhile, the Southwest Basin features a wetland.

== See also ==
- List of lakes of British Columbia
