= Rimrock Lake, British Columbia =

Lake in British Columbia, Canada

Rimrock Lake
- Location within British Columbia
- Location: Cariboo Regional District, British Columbia, Canada
- Coordinates: 52.48349°N 122.32409°W
- Surface area: 41.8 ha (103 acres)
- Average depth: 10.2 m (33 ft)
- Max. depth: 24 m (79 ft)
- Water volume: 4,256,400 m^{3} (3,450.7 acre⋅ft)
- Shore length^{1}: 2 km (1.2 miles)
- Surface elevation: 880 m (2,890 ft)
- ^{1} Shore length is not a well-defined measure.

Rimrock Lake is a lake in the Cariboo Regional District of British Columbia, about 25 miles (40 km) north of the city of Williams Lake. It lies at 880 metres (2,890 ft) elevation immediately adjacent to Cuisson Lake.

Rimrock Lake has a mean depth of 10.2 metres (33 ft), maximum depth of 24 metres (79 ft) and approximate surface area of 41.8 hectares (103 acres).
