= Pennask Lake Provincial Park =

Park in British Columbia, Canada

- IUCN category II (national park)
- Location within British Columbia
- Interactive map of Pennask Lake Provincial Park
- Location: British Columbia, Canada
- Nearest city: Peachland
- Coordinates: 49°59′14″N 120°06′04″W
- Area: 2.44 km^{2} (0.94 sq mi)
- Established: May 2, 1974
- Governing body: BC Parks

Pennask Lake Provincial Park is a provincial park in British Columbia, Canada, located on the easternmost heights of the Thompson Plateau, 50 km (31 mi) to the northwest of the Okanagan town of Peachland.

Pennask Lake is a high elevation lake that has multiple spring creeks flowing into it. The park takes in two bays at the southeast corner of Pennask Lake. Peterson Bay is a long, narrow bay which provides entry into the main portion of the lake from the park. Chapman Bay is a shallow, confined bay at the north end of the park. The park fronts one kilometre of the lake's south shore.
