= Somenos Lake =

Lake in British Columbia, Canada

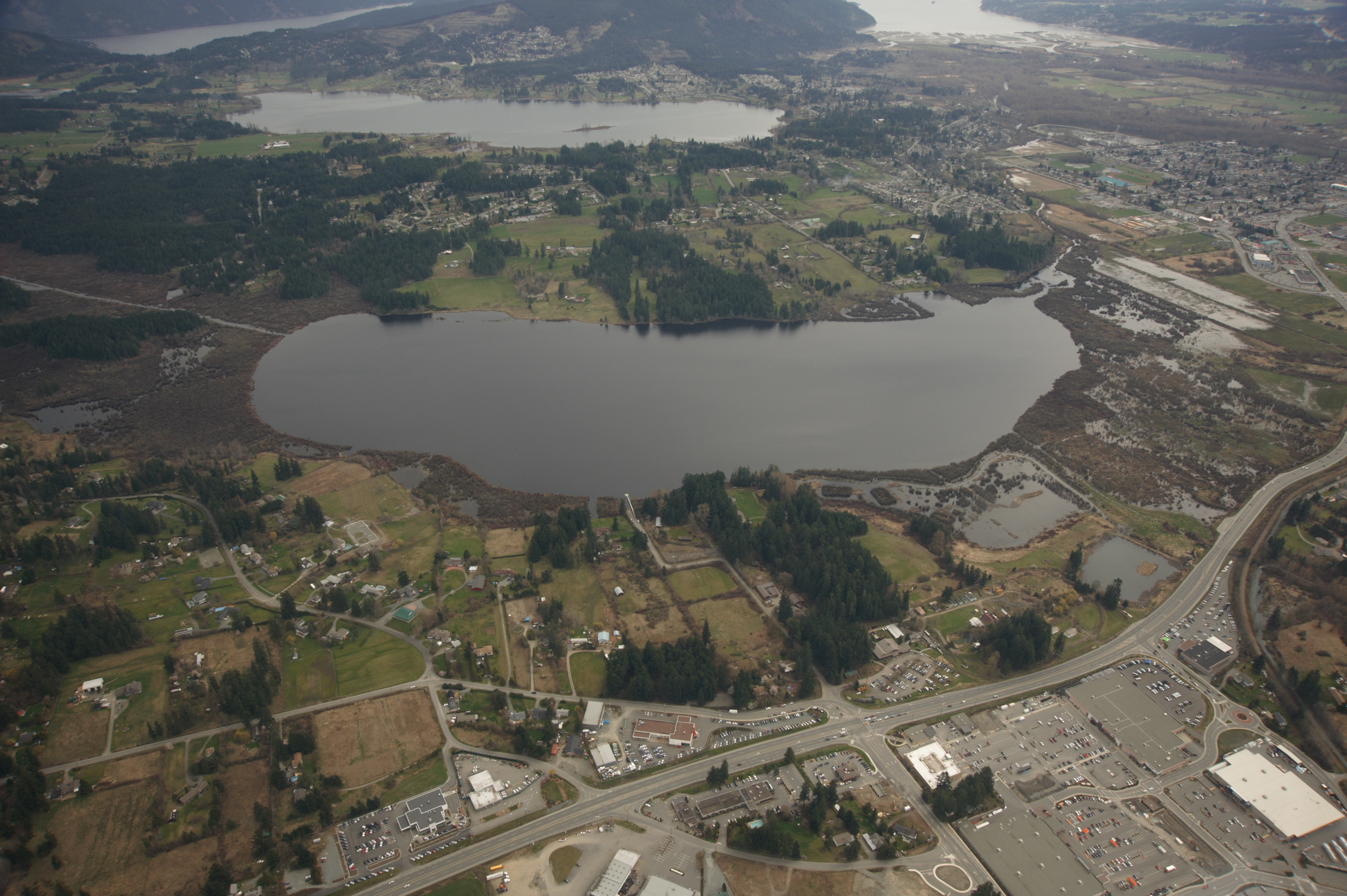
- An Aerial view of Somenos Lake looking from west to east during winter high water. Quamichan Lake can be seen to the east at the top of the image and Cowichan Bay to the south east, is visible to the upper right.

- Location within Vancouver Island
- Location: North Cowichan, Vancouver Island, British Columbia, Canada
- Coordinates: 48.802°N 123.704°W
- Primary inflows: Richards Creek, Averill Creek, Bings Creek
- Primary outflows: Somenos Creek
- Max. depth: 22.2 feet (6.8 m)

Somenos Lake is a small shallow water body located in the Municipality of North Cowichan on Southeast Vancouver Island. Somenos Lake has a maximum area of approximately 247 ac, 100 ha at 15.3 feet (4.7 m) above geodetic datum. The Lake is relatively shallow with a maximum depth of 22.2 feet (6.8 m). Somenos Lake is fed by three major tributary streams: Richards Creek from the North and Northeast, Averill Creek from the Northwest and Bings Creek from the West. The lake is drained near its southern extremity by Somenos Creek which flows southeast approximately 4 kilometres (2.5 mi) to the Cowichan River.

Somenos Lake and its tributary streams support resident populations of rainbow trout (Oncorhynchus mykiss) and cutthroat trout (O. clarkii). Anadromous populations of coho salmon (O. kisutch) and chum salmon (O. keta) spawn in the tributary streams. The Lake also contains populations of native brown bullhead (Ameiurus nebulosus), three-spined stickleback (Gasterosteus aculeatus), and peamouth chub (Mylocheilus caurinus). The invasive species pumpkinseed (Lepomis gibbosus) has been in the lake since the 1970s. and is now the most abundant fish species.

In addition to these fish species, Somenos Lake and associated marsh habitats are an important winter refuge for numerous species of ducks, geese and swans. Of particular interest to conservation is the large number of trumpeter swans (Cygnus buccinator) that arrive at Somenos Lake in October and remain until early April.

During the past two decades Somenos Lake has been subject to persistent cyanobacteria blooms during the summers. These blooms render the lake unsuitable for human uses like swimming, canoeing and birding. The decay of the highly productive cyanobacteria also generates anoxic conditions in the water column which severely limits habitat for trout and salmon. These blooms are the result of excessive phosphorus in the lake due to deforestation and excessive use of phosphate fertilizers in surrounding agricultural and urban lands.

== Management ==
Somenos Lake and its surrounding marsh and wetland habitats are managed by the Somenos Management Committee. This organisation promotes stewardship and habitat restoration in the Lake and surrounding environs. Membership of the committee includes Cowichan Tribes, North Cowichan, Ducks Unlimited Canada, and the Somenos Marsh Wildlife Society.

== See also ==
- List of lakes of British Columbia
