= Spider Lake (Vancouver Island) =

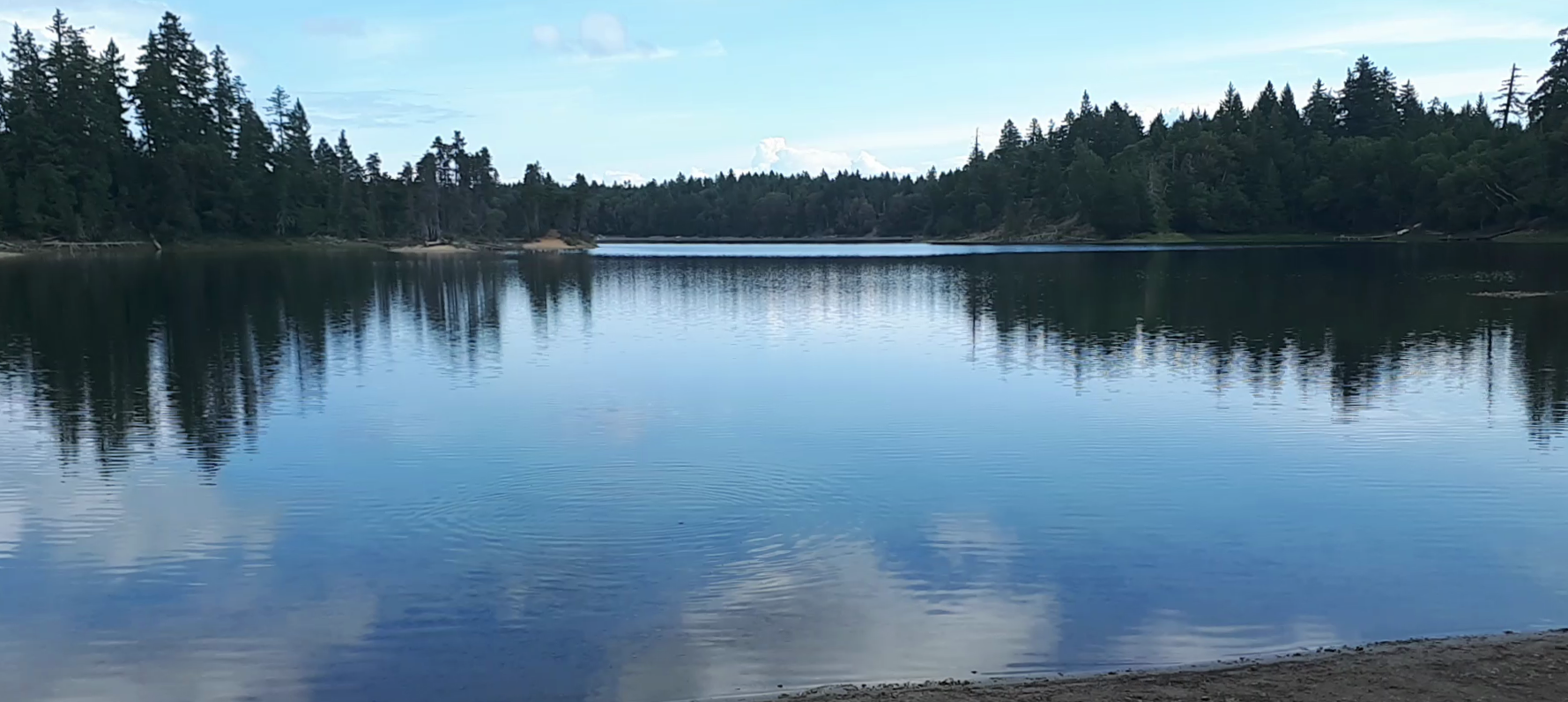
- Spider Lake

- Location within Vancouver Island
- Location: Vancouver Island, British Columbia
- Coordinates: 49°21′00″N 124°37′00″W
- Lake type: Natural lake
- Basin countries: Canada

Spider Lake is a lake that is located east of Horne Lake.

== See also ==
- List of lakes of British Columbia
