= Lizard Lake (Vancouver Island) =

Lake in British Columbia, Canada

- Location within Vancouver Island
- Location: Vancouver Island, British Columbia
- Coordinates: 49°08′00″N 124°41′00″W
- Lake type: Natural lake
- Basin countries: Canada
- Surface elevation: 737 m (2,418 ft)

Lizard Lake is a lake located on Vancouver Island and is an expansion of Williams Creek. The lake lies at 737 metres (2,418 ft) above sea level in the China Creek Community Watershed.

== See also ==
- List of lakes of British Columbia
