= Rose Lake, British Columbia =

Coordinates: 54°24′00″N 126°02′00″W

Rose Lake is an unincorporated community on the Yellowhead Highway in the Bulkley Valley region of northwestern British Columbia, Canada. Its name is derived from the nearby waterbody Rose Lake. The community and the lake are along the northern mainline of the Canadian National Railway just northeast of Bulkley Lake.

The area of Rose Lake is notable in the field of montane prominence, as it is the location of the divide between the Fraser and Skeena River basins such that the locality forms the prominence col for Mount Waddington, the highest peak completely within British Columbia.

== See also ==
- Rose Lake (disambiguation)
