= Alberni Valley =

Valley in British Columbia, Canada

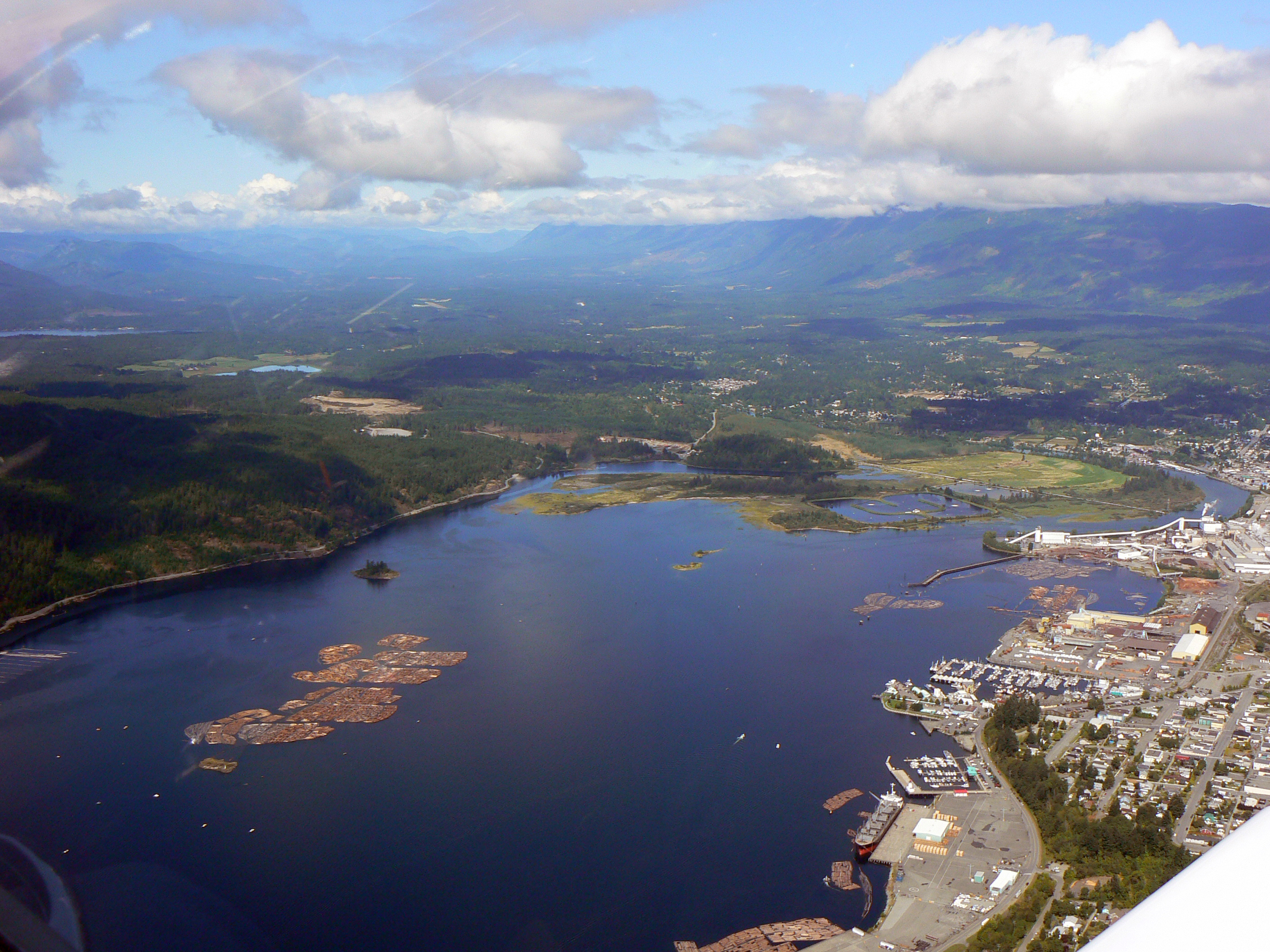

- Location within British Columbia

Geography
- Location: Vancouver Island, British Columbia, Canada
- Population centers: Port Alberni
- Coordinates: 49°15′N 124°48′W
- Interactive map of Alberni Valley

Alberni Valley is a broad valley located at the head of Alberni Inlet on Vancouver Island in British Columbia, Canada. It is home to Port Alberni, Sproat Lake and other outlying areas. The term is largely used as a synonym for Greater Port Alberni and adjoining communities but is used in a larger regional sense as well. Various local organizations and companies use the term "Alberni Valley" in their name, e.g. the Alberni Valley Times and Alberni Valley News newspapers the Alberni Valley Chamber of Commerce and the Alberni Valley Bulldogs minor hockey team. The Canadian pioneer, Joe Drinkwater lived in Alberni Valley during the late nineteenth and early twentieth centuries.

== Geography ==
The Alberni Valley has some unique traits on account of being surrounded by mountainous terrain on almost all sides. These mountains restrict sea breezes which would otherwise make the valley milder over each winter and cooler during summer. Winds often remain light in the valley during storms which produce strong breezes, gale force winds or even storm force winds over other parts of Vancouver Island. Soils in the valley tend to be red, with abundant concretions.

- Mount Arrowsmith is the largest mountain on southern Vancouver Island. It has some of the most accessible alpine and sub-alpine areas for Victoria and other large towns on the Island. These zones contain several rare and endangered species of plants and animals, the most notable of which is the Vancouver Island Marmot, which has the dubious distinction of being Canada's rarest mammal. Although the mountain is contained within a UNESCO Biosphere Reserve it is not part of a park. Efforts are currently underway to confer official park status on the alpine areas of the Arrowsmith massif and surrounding areas.
- Beaufort Range North of Port Alberni and west of Qualicum Beach.
- Ash Lake
- Buttle Lake
- Cameron Lake
- Devils Den Lake
- Dickson Lake
- Doran Lake
- Elsie Lake
- Esary Lake
- Father and Son Lake
- Gracie Lake
- Great Central Lake is a large lake in the Alberni Valley. The lake has a surface area of 51 square kilometres and a maximum depth of 294 m. It takes its name from the fact that it is a large lake in the center of Vancouver Island.
- Hucuktlis Lake
- Henry Lake
- Horne Lake
- Kammat Lake
- Kennedy Lake is the largest lake on Vancouver Island, British Columbia, Canada. Located northeast of Ucluelet on the Island's central west coast, the lake is formed chiefly by the confluence of the Clayoquot and Kennedy Rivers.
- Klitsa Mountain
- Labour Day Lake
- Lacy Lake
- Little Toquart Lake
- Lizard Pond
- Lowry Lake
- Long Lake
- McLaughlin Lake
- Maggie Lake
- Marshy Lake
- Muriel Lake
- Nahmint Lake
- Nitinat Lake
- Sproat Lake, named after Gilbert Malcolm Sproat, is a lake in central Vancouver Island. Home of the last Martin Mars Waterbombers, and nearby to Port Alberni.
- Tsable Lake
- Toquart Lake
- Turnbull Lake
- Turtle Lake
- Uchuck Lake
- Stamp Falls
- Stamp River
- Somass River
- Kennedy River
- Ash River
- Taylor River
- Rogers Creek
- China Creek
- Drinkwater Creek

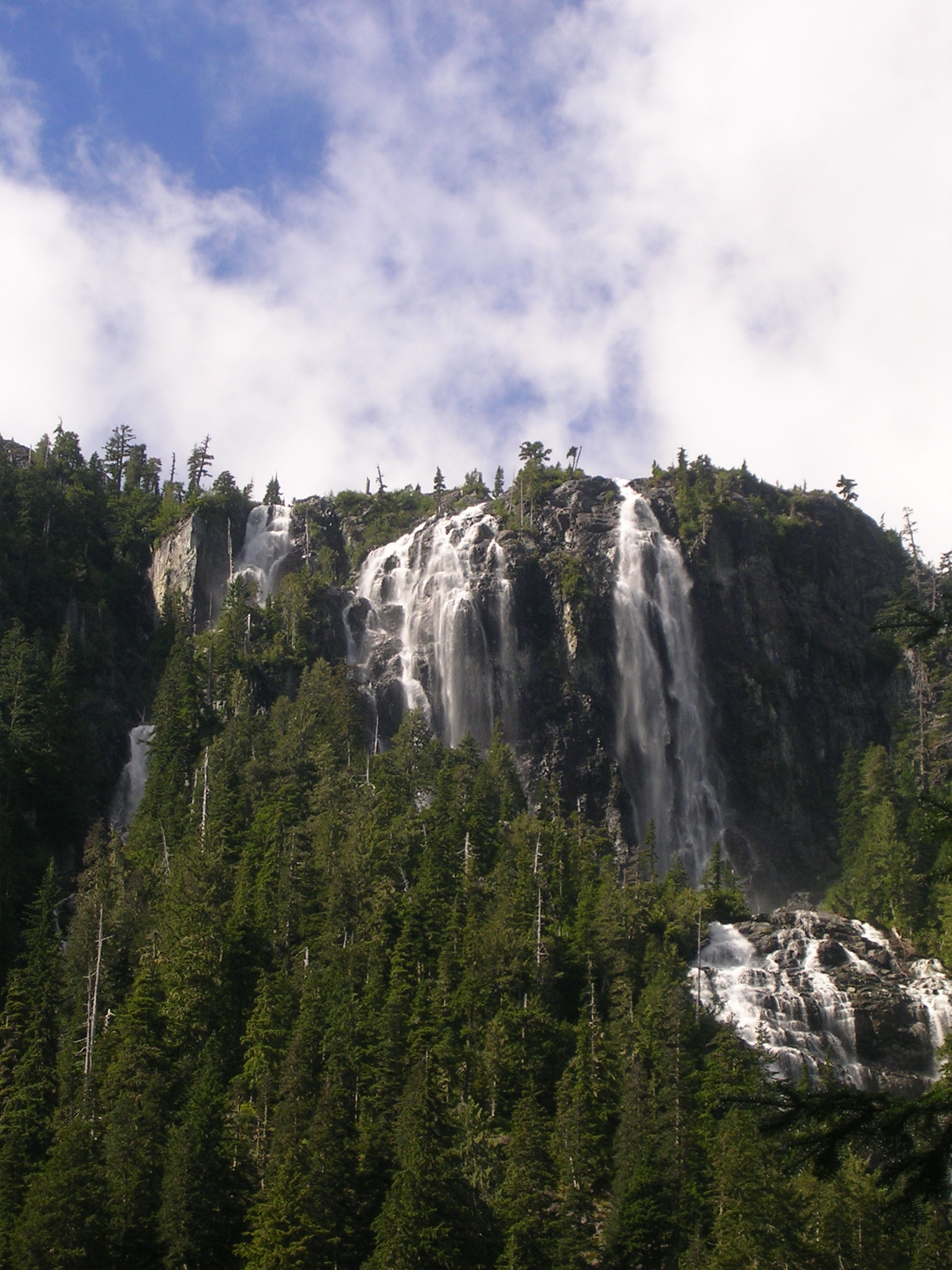
Della Falls

- Cherry Creek
- Beaver Creek
- Sproat River
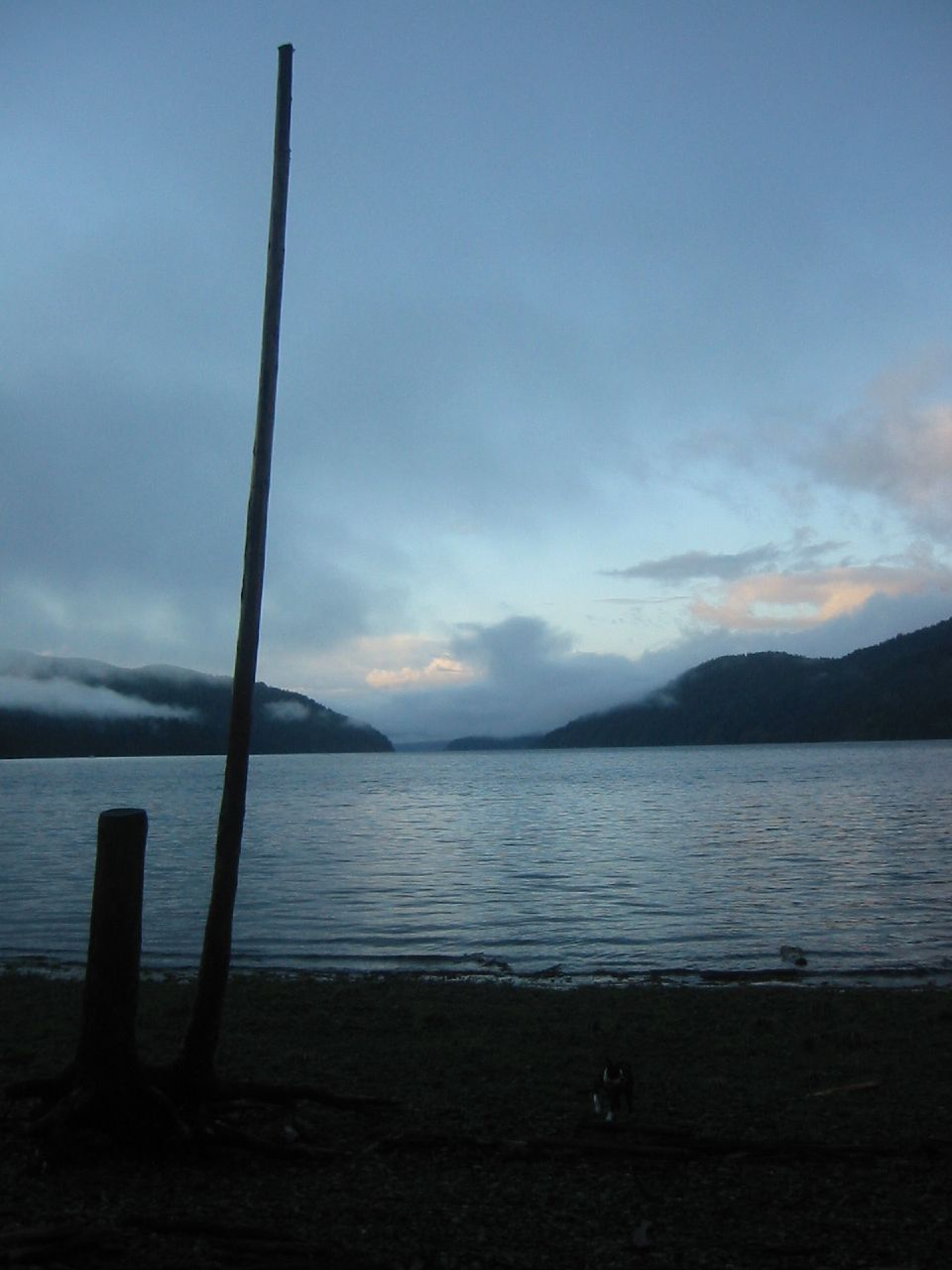
- Alberni Canal at China Creek
  Alberni Inlet is a long, narrow inlet in Vancouver Island, British Columbia, Canada, that stretches from the Pacific Ocean at Barkley Sound about 40 kilometres (25 mi) inland terminating at Port Alberni.
- Barkley Sound
- Della Falls Della Falls is a waterfall in Strathcona Provincial Park on Vancouver Island. It is widely regarded as the tallest in Canada.

== First Nations ==
First Nations cultures are an essential part of the Alberni Valley's makeup. The Tseshaht and the Hupacasath are two of the tribes that make up the Nuu-chah-nulth Tribal Council.
