= Henry =

Henry may refer to:

== People and fictional characters ==
- Henry (given name), including lists of people and fictional characters
- Henry (surname)
- Henry, a stage name of François-Louis Henry (1786–1855), French baritone
- Henry, the title character in Horrid Henry

== Arts and entertainment ==
- Henry (2011 film), a Canadian short film
- Henry (2015 film), a virtual reality film
- Henry: Portrait of a Serial Killer, a 1986 American crime film
- Henry (comics), an American comic strip created in 1932 by Carl Anderson
- "Henry", a song by New Riders of the Purple Sage

== Places ==
=== Antarctica ===
- Henry Bay, Wilkes Land

=== Australia ===
- Henry River (New South Wales)
- Henry River (Western Australia)

=== Canada ===
- Henry Lake (Vancouver Island), British Columbia
- Henry Lake (Halifax County), Nova Scotia
- Henry Lake (District of Chester), Nova Scotia

=== New Zealand ===
- Lake Henry (New Zealand)
- Henry River (New Zealand)

=== United States ===
- Henry, Illinois
- Henry, Nebraska
- Henry, South Dakota
- Henry County (disambiguation)
- Henry Creek, a stream in Kansas
- Henry Township (disambiguation)
- Lake Henry (disambiguation)

=== Extraterrestrial ===
- Henry (Apollo lunar crater)
- Henry (lunar crater)
- Henry (Martian crater)

== Ships ==
- HMS Henry (1660), English Royal Navy vessels
- Henry (ship), several ships
- SS Henry, a Norwegian merchant ship sunk in contentious circumstances in 1944

== Other uses ==
- Henry (unit), the SI unit of inductance
- Henry (vacuum), a cylinder vacuum cleaner
- Henry rifle, a lever-action tubular magazine rifle
- Henry Repeating Arms, a firearm manufacturing company
- Henry the Hexapus, an octopus found by British marine scientists in 2008
- Henry (tuatara), a nocturnal living in New Zealand
- High Earners Not Rich Yet, financial demographic
- Henry J, an automobile built by the Kaiser-Frazer Corporation

== See also ==
- oh, Henry, a candy bar invented in 1920
- Henry's (disambiguation)
- Fort Henry (disambiguation)
- Henery (disambiguation)
- Henry's law, a gas law in physical chemistry
- Henri, the French version of the given name
- Henrik, a male given name
- Military Order of St. Henry, award of the Kingdom of Saxony
