= Lake Henry =

Lake Henry may refer to:

== Cities, towns, townships etc. ==
- Lake Henry, Minnesota, a small city in Stearns County
- Lake Henry Township, Stearns County, Minnesota

== Lakes ==
- Lake Henry (Ontario)
- Lake Henry (Florida), located in Highlands County, Florida
- Lake Henry (Polk County, Florida), northeast of Winter Haven, Florida
- Lake Henry (Douglas County, Minnesota)
- Lake Henry (Le Sueur County, Minnesota)
- Lake Henry, a lake in Kingsbury County, South Dakota, near De Smet
- Lake Henry (Nova Scotia)
- Lake Henry (Bon Homme County, South Dakota)
- Lake Henry (Codington County, South Dakota)
- Lake Henry (Kingsbury County, South Dakota)
- Lake Henry (New Zealand)

== See also ==
- Henry Lake (disambiguation)
