= Klitsa Mountain =

Mountain in British Columbia, Canada

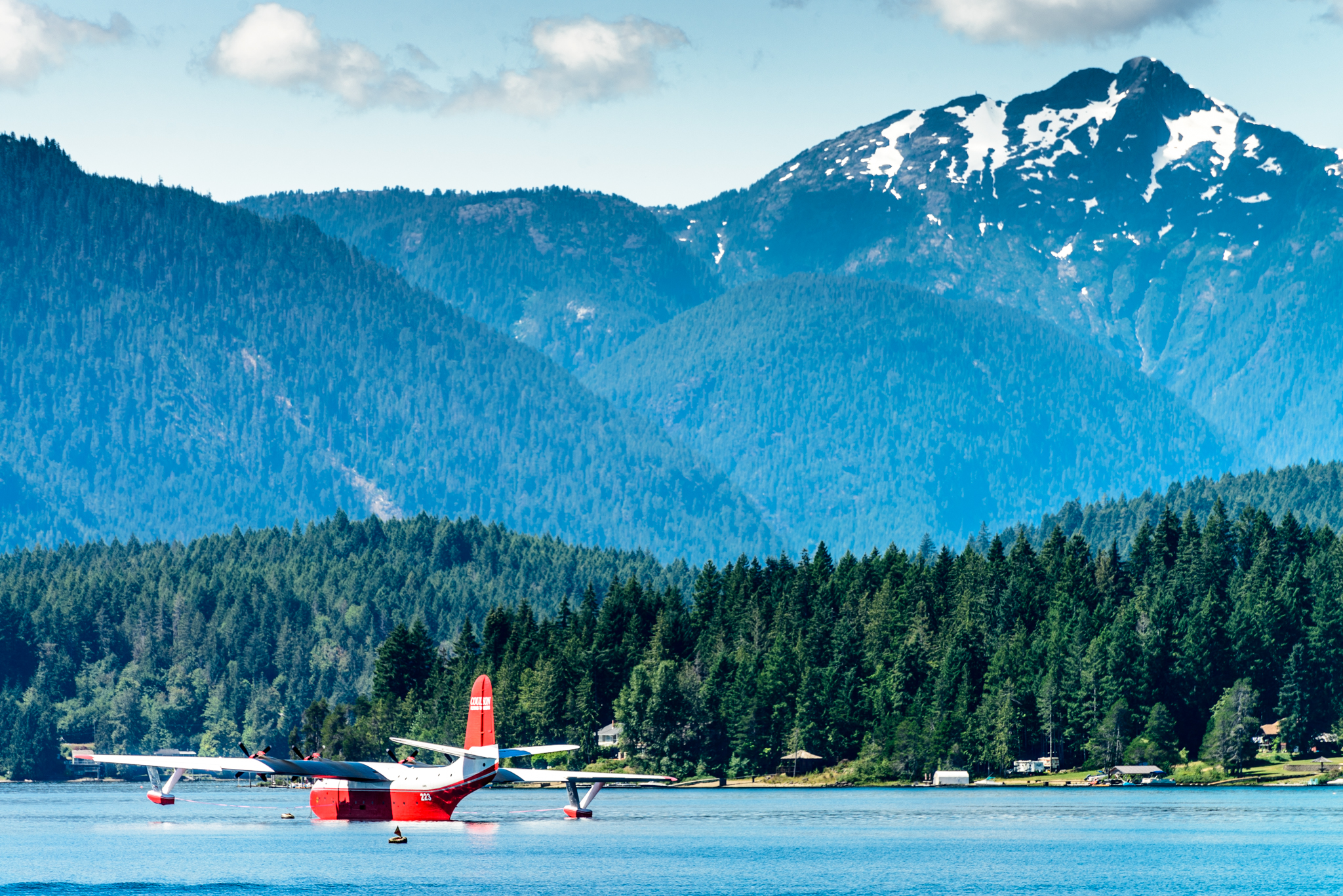
- Klitsa Mountain viewed from Sproat Lake

Highest point
- Elevation: 1,639 m (5,377 ft)
- Prominence: 1,389 m (4,557 ft)
- Coordinates: 49°15′10.36″N 125°13′49.94″W

Geography
- Location within Vancouver Island Location within British Columbia
- Interactive map of Klitsa Mountain
- Location: Vancouver Island, British Columbia, Canada
- District: Clayoquot Land District
- Parent range: Vancouver Island Ranges
- Topo map: NTS 92F6 Great Central Lake

Klitsa Mountain is a prominent mountain on Vancouver Island, British Columbia, Canada, located 26 km (16 mi) west of Beaver Creek and 59 km (37 mi) southeast of Golden Hinde. It can be viewed from Highway 4 along Sproat Lake. It is the second highest mountain in the Alberni Valley area, after Mount Arrowsmith. its name derives from a Nuu-Chah-Nulth word meaning "always white".

== See also ==
- List of mountains in Canada
