= Alberini =

Alberini is a surname. Notable people with the surname include:

- Cristina Alberini, Italian neuroscientist
- Filoteo Alberini (1865–1937), Italian film director
- Pietro Alberini (1625–1679), Italian Roman Catholic prelate

== See also ==
- Alberni (disambiguation)
