= Mount Joan =

Mountain in British Columbia, Canada

- Location within Vancouver Island Location within British Columbia
- Interactive map of Mount Joan

Highest point
- Elevation: 1,556 m (5,105 ft)
- Prominence: 1,131 m (3,711 ft)
- Coordinates: 49°24′55″N 124°55′14″W

Geography
- Location: Vancouver Island, British Columbia, Canada
- District: Newcastle Land District
- Parent range: Vancouver Island Ranges
- Topo map: NTS 92F7 Horne Lake

Mount Joan is a mountain located on Vancouver Island, British Columbia. It is the highest of the peaks in the Beaufort Range that runs between Courtenay and Port Alberni in British Columbia. The Beaufort Range is one of the Vancouver Island Ranges
