= Henry Lake =

Henry Lake may refer to:

- Henry Lake (Halifax County), Nova Scotia
- Henry Lake (District of Chester) in Chester, Nova Scotia
- Henry Lake (Vancouver Island) on Vancouver Island, British Columbia
- Henry Atwell Lake (1808–1881), colonel of the Royal Engineers in England

== See also ==
- Harry Lake (disambiguation)
- Lake Henry (disambiguation)
