= Turnbull Lake =

- Location within Vancouver Island
- Location: Vancouver Island, British Columbia
- Coordinates: 49°26′00″N 125°06′00″W
- Lake type: Natural lake
- Basin countries: Canada

Turnbull Lake is a lake located on Vancouver Island north of Great Central Lake, south east of Elsie Lake.

== See also ==
- List of lakes of British Columbia
