= Horne Lake Caves Provincial Park =

Provincial park on Vancouver Island in British Columbia, Canada

- IUCN category II (national park)
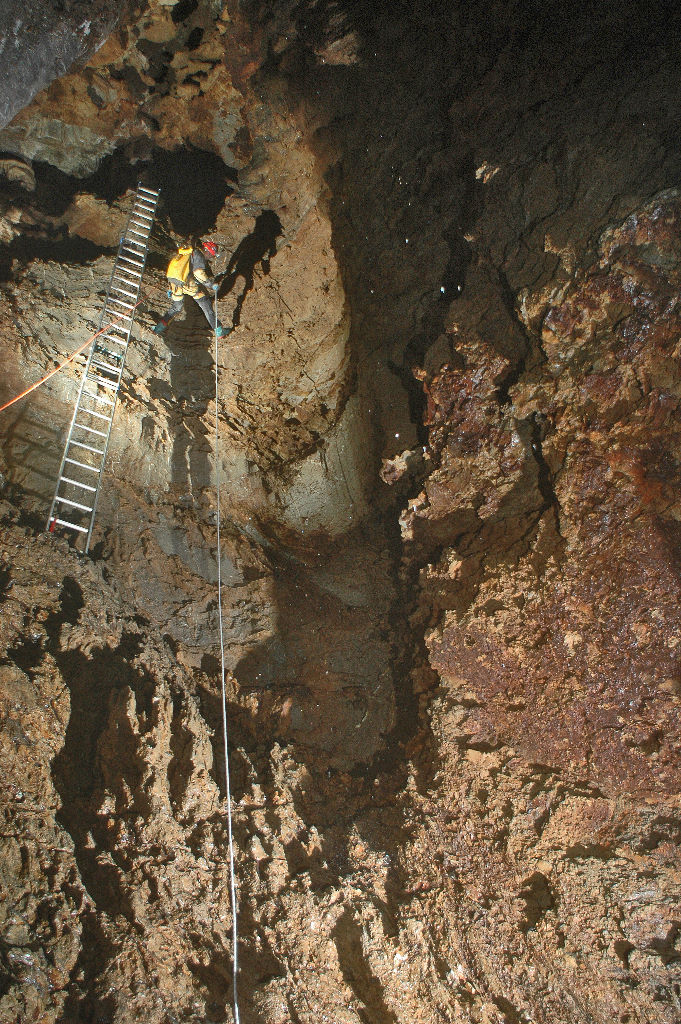
- A vertical drop in Riverbend cave at Horne Lake, part of an adventure caving tour

- Location within Vancouver Island Location within British Columbia
- Interactive map of Horne Lake Caves Provincial Park
- Location: Alberni Land District, British Columbia, Canada
- Nearest city: Port Alberni, BC
- Coordinates: 49°20′42″N 124°45′14″W
- Area: 158 ha (390 acres)
- Established: January 29, 1971
- Governing body: BC Parks
- Website: bcparks.ca/horne-lake-caves-park/

Horne Lake Caves Provincial Park is a provincial park on Vancouver Island in British Columbia, Canada. Its principal function is the protection, management, and recreational use of several caves collectively known as the Horne Lake Caves.

== History ==
Although certainly known to the Qualicum First Nation, the first reference to caves at Horne Lake is in a geological report from 1912. Two caves known as Main and Lower Main were thereafter known to loggers, and public visitation increased after they were publicised in 1939. In 1941 the larger Riverbend Cave was discovered and was a popular tourist site by 1945. In 1957 the Province placed a 29 ha. reserve around the Horne Lake caves which by then had been stripped of many of their formations.

Fears of vandalism in the recently revealed Euclataws Cave (discovered in 1963 by Jim & Delores Johnson of Nanaimo BC, but kept secret until about 1969) led local cavers to approach the provincial government for protection, and in January 1971 Horne Lake Caves became a provincial park. Euclataws and Riverbend Cave were gated and guided tours commenced in Main, Lower Main and Riverbend caves. Vandalism and gate-breaching continued, however, and in 1984 a serious incident of vandalism in Riverbend Cave led to increased attention and the creation of a management plan in 1985, followed by improved visitor facilities and privately managed cave tours. Four additional caves, Cougar Cave, Eggshell Cave, Andre's Annex and Riverbend Trail Slot Cave, have recently been documented within the park. The park includes forest and part of the Qualicum River which provides opportunities for hiking, fishing and canoeing.

== Location ==
The 158 ha Horne Lake Caves Provincial Park is located approximately 60 km north of Nanaimo and 26 km west of Qualicum, and is 12 km from the Horne Lake exit off Highway 19.

== Gallery ==
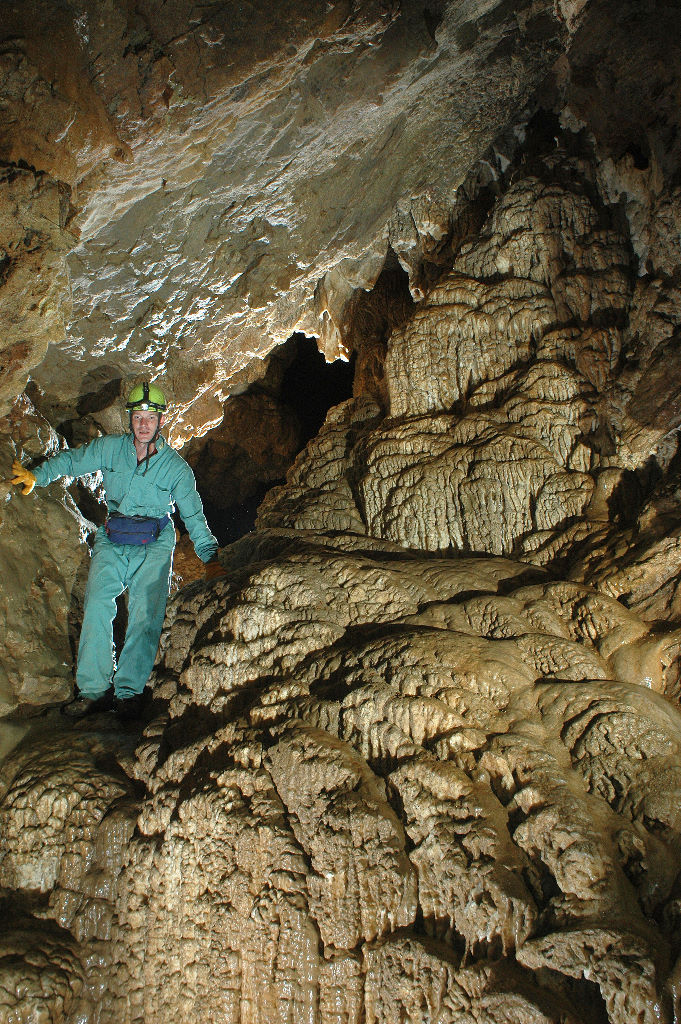
The lower cave at Horne Lake, open to public visitation.

== See also ==
Adam Grant Horne for whom Horne Lake was named.
