= Dickson Lake (Vancouver Island) =

- Location within Vancouver Island
- Location: Vancouver Island, British Columbia
- Coordinates: 49°24′00″N 125°05′00″W
- Lake type: Natural lake
- Primary outflows: Ash River
- Basin countries: Canada

Dickson Lake is a lake located north of Great Central Lake in Newcastle Land District, British Columbia. Robert Brown in 1864 on the Vancouver Island Exploring Expedition named the lake after Dr. James Dickson.

== See also ==
- List of lakes of British Columbia
