= Beaufort Range =

Mountain range in British Columbia, Canada

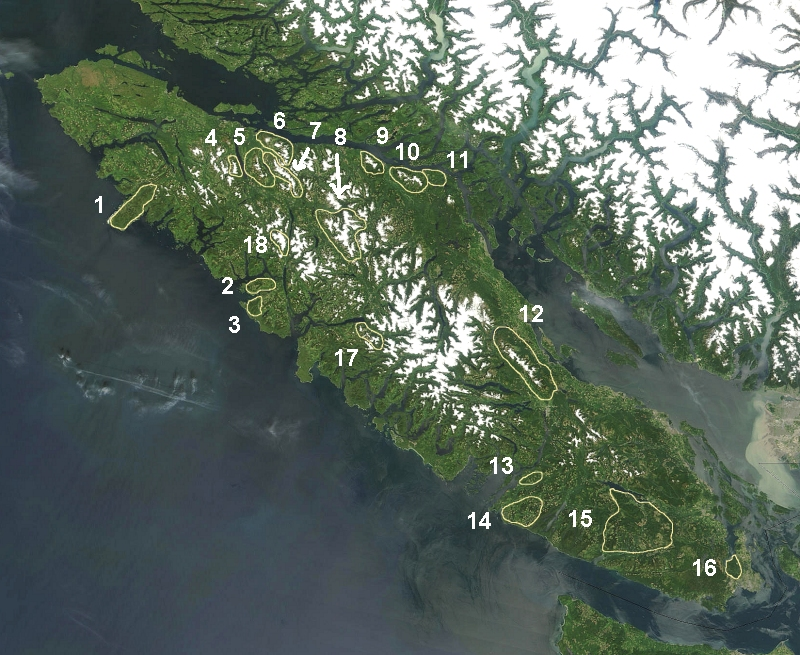
- The Beaufort Range is marked 12 on map

Highest point
- Peak: Mount Joan
- Elevation: 1,556 m (5,105 ft)
- Coordinates: 49°24′52.9″N 124°55′10.9″W

Dimensions
- Area: 647 km^{2} (250 mi^{2})

Geography
- Location within British Columbia
- Country: Canada
- Region: British Columbia
- Parent range: Vancouver Island Ranges
- Topo map(s): NTS 92F10 Comox; NTS 92F11 Forbidden Plateau; NTS 92F6 Great Central Lake; NTS 92F7 Horne Lake

The Beaufort Range is a mountain range on southern Vancouver Island, British Columbia, Canada, located north of Port Alberni and to the west of Qualicum Beach, and running from Horne Lake in the southeast to Comox Lake in the northwest. It has an area of 448 km^{2} and is a subrange of the Vancouver Island Ranges which in turn form part of the Insular Mountains.

The highest mountain in the Beaufort Range is Mount Joan at 1,556 m (5,105 ft).

The range is named for Sir Francis Beaufort, hydrographer to the Royal Navy.

== See also ==
- List of mountain ranges
