= Scotland School District =

Scotland School District may refer to:

- Scotland School District 4-3 - Scotland, South Dakota
- Scotland School District (Arkansas) (defunct) - Scotland, Arkansas
