= Alberni =

Alberni may refer to:

- Port Alberni, a city of Vancouver Island, British Columbia, Canada
- Alberni (electoral district), a defunct electoral district of British Columbia, Canada
- Alberni Inlet, an inlet of Vancouver Island, British Columbia, Canada
- Alberni Valley, a valley of Vancouver Island, British Columbia, Canada
- HMCS Alberni, a Flower-class of the Royal Canadian Navy

== People with the surname ==
- Luis Alberni (1886–1962), Spanish-born American actor

== See also ==
- Alberni Quartet, an English string quartet
