= Lowry Lake =

- Location within Vancouver Island
- Location: Vancouver Island, British Columbia
- Coordinates: 49°24′00″N 125°08′00″W
- Lake type: Natural lake
- Basin countries: Canada

Lowry Lake is a lake located on Vancouver Island north of Great Central Lake, west of Dickson Lake.

== Nearby lakes ==
Ash, Turnbull and McLaughlin Lakes - Ash, Turnbull and McLaughlin Lakes are located nearby and accessed via either Highway 4(west), Great Central Lake Road or the Ash River logging mainline.

== See also ==
- List of lakes of British Columbia
