= Mount Vernon, South Dakota =

- City
- Motto: "Small Town But Big Opportunities"
- Location in Davison County and the state of South Dakota
- Coordinates: 43°42′46″N 98°15′40″W
- Country: United States
- State: South Dakota
- County: Davison
- Incorporated: 1903

Government
  - Mayor: Weston Frank

Area
  - Total: 0.34 sq mi (0.88 km^{2})
  - Land: 0.34 sq mi (0.88 km^{2})
  - Water: 0 sq mi (0.00 km^{2})
- Elevation: 1,408 ft (429 m)

Population (2020)
  - Total: 461
  - Density: 1,357.4/sq mi (524.11/km^{2})
- Time zone: UTC-6 (Central (CST))
  - Summer (DST): UTC-5 (CDT)
- ZIP code: 57363
- Area code: 605
- FIPS code: 46-44100
- GNIS feature ID: 1267487
- Website: www.mtvernonsd.com

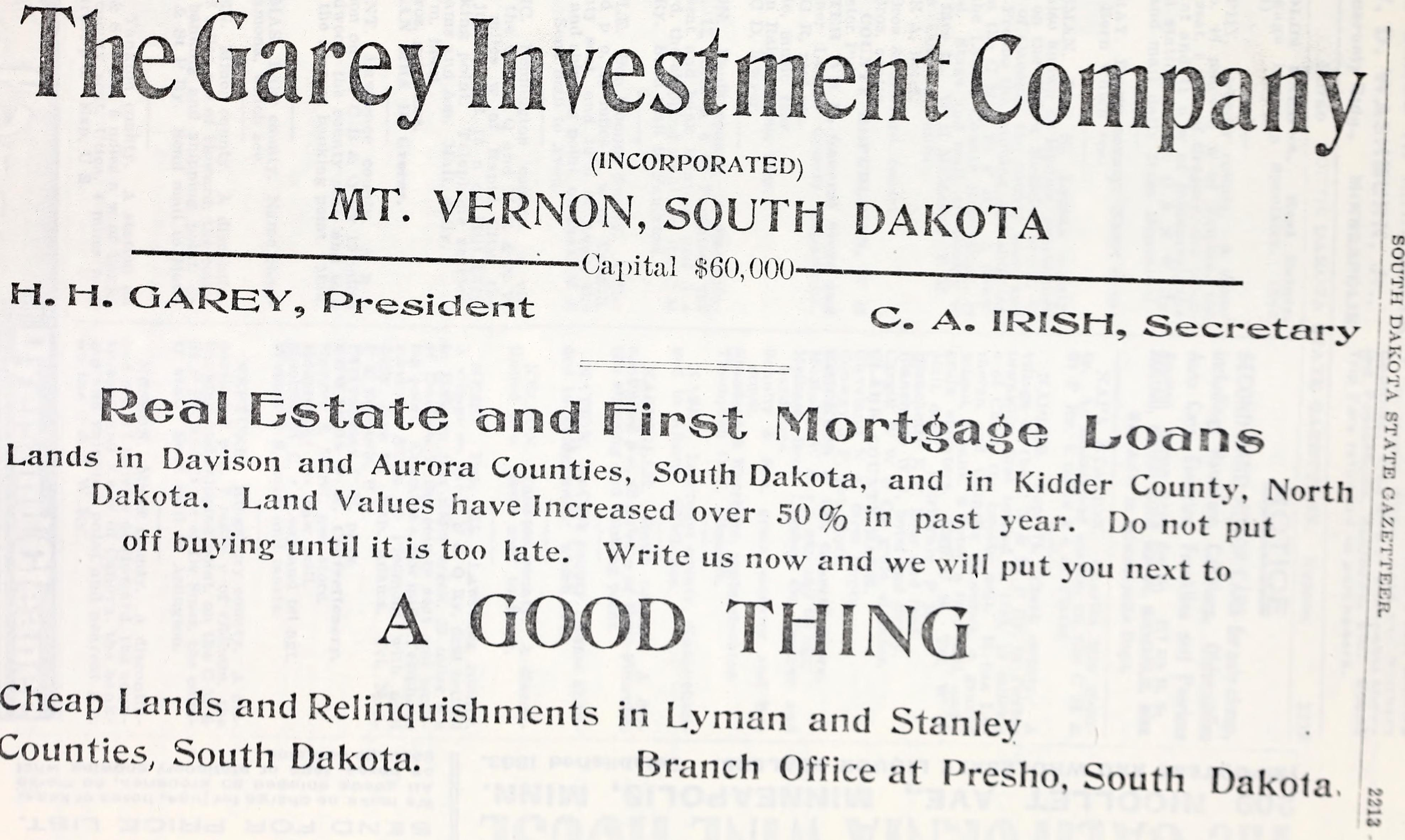
1906 advertisement

Mount Vernon is a city in Davison County, South Dakota, United States. The population was 461 at the 2020 census. It is part of the Mitchell, South Dakota Micropolitan Statistical Area.

The town takes its name from Mount Vernon, the estate of George Washington; an early variant name was Arlandtown.

== Geography ==
According to the United States Census Bureau, the city has a total area of 0.35 square miles (0.91 km^{2}), all land.

== Demographics ==
Historical population
Census	Pop.	Note	%±
1890	127		—
1900	222		74.8%
1910	614		176.6%
1920	661		7.7%
1930	489		−26.0%
1940	405		−17.2%
1950	387		−4.4%
1960	379		−2.1%
1970	398		5.0%
1980	402		1.0%
1990	368		−8.5%
2000	477		29.6%
2010	462		−3.1%
2020	461		−0.2%
U.S. Decennial Census

=== 2020 census ===
As of the 2020 census, Mount Vernon had a population of 461. The median age was 37.8 years. 25.4% of residents were under the age of 18 and 13.7% of residents were 65 years of age or older. For every 100 females there were 96.2 males, and for every 100 females age 18 and over there were 96.6 males age 18 and over.

0.0% of residents lived in urban areas, while 100.0% lived in rural areas.

There were 196 households in Mount Vernon, of which 34.7% had children under the age of 18 living in them. Of all households, 54.1% were married-couple households, 18.4% were households with a male householder and no spouse or partner present, and 20.4% were households with a female householder and no spouse or partner present. About 28.0% of all households were made up of individuals and 8.1% had someone living alone who was 65 years of age or older.

There were 210 housing units, of which 6.7% were vacant. The homeowner vacancy rate was 2.7% and the rental vacancy rate was 0.0%.

Racial composition as of the 2020 census
Race	Number	Percent
White	423	91.8%
Black or African American	0	0.0%
American Indian and Alaska Native	11	2.4%
Asian	0	0.0%
Native Hawaiian and Other Pacific Islander	0	0.0%
Some other race	2	0.4%
Two or more races	25	5.4%
Hispanic or Latino (of any race)	8	1.7%

=== 2010 census ===
As of the census of 2010, there were 462 people, 178 households, and 125 families residing in the city. The population density was 1,320.0 inhabitants per square mile (509.7/km^{2}). There were 205 housing units at an average density of 585.7 per square mile (226.1/km^{2}). The racial makeup of the city was 92.6% White, 5.4% Native American, 0.4% Pacific Islander, and 1.5% from two or more races. Hispanic or Latino of any race were 2.2% of the population.

There were 178 households, of which 39.9% had children under the age of 18 living with them, 59.0% were married couples living together, 6.2% had a female householder with no husband present, 5.1% had a male householder with no wife present, and 29.8% were non-families. 25.8% of all households were made up of individuals, and 10.1% had someone living alone who was 65 years of age or older. The average household size was 2.60 and the average family size was 3.15.

The median age in the city was 37.4 years. 30.1% of residents were under the age of 18; 6.8% were between the ages of 18 and 24; 23.8% were from 25 to 44; 26.4% were from 45 to 64; and 12.8% were 65 years of age or older. The gender makeup of the city was 53.0% male and 47.0% female.

=== 2000 census ===
As of the census of 2000, there were 477 people, 177 households, and 127 families residing in the city. The population density was 1,489.3 inhabitants per square mile (575.0/km^{2}). There were 189 housing units at an average density of 590.1 per square mile (227.8/km^{2}). The racial makeup of the city was 98.11% White, 0.21% Native American, 1.68% from other races. Hispanic or Latino of any race were 1.68% of the population.

There were 177 households, out of which 40.7% had children under the age of 18 living with them, 63.3% were married couples living together, 6.2% had a female householder with no husband present, and 28.2% were non-families. 23.2% of all households were made up of individuals, and 11.9% had someone living alone who was 65 years of age or older. The average household size was 2.69 and the average family size was 3.23.

In the city, the population was spread out, with 31.9% under the age of 18, 6.7% from 18 to 24, 30.6% from 25 to 44, 18.0% from 45 to 64, and 12.8% who were 65 years of age or older. The median age was 35 years. For every 100 females, there were 99.6 males. For every 100 females age 18 and over, there were 91.2 males.

The median income for a household in the city was $36,806, and the median income for a family was $41,250. Males had a median income of $30,250 versus $17,500 for females. The per capita income for the city was $14,864. About 2.3% of families and 4.1% of the population were below the poverty line, including 1.3% of those under age 18 and 12.3% of those age 65 or over.

== Notable people ==
- Chad Greenway, Minnesota Vikings linebacker
- Ralph Homan, businessman and member of the South Dakota House of Representatives
- Joshua Klumb businessman, farmer, and member of the South Dakota Senate
