= Harry Lake (disambiguation) =

Harry Lake (1911–1967) was a New Zealand politician.

Harry Lake may also refer to:

- Harry Lake (boxer) (1902–1970), English boxer of the 1900s, 1910s and 1920s
- Harry Lake Aspen Provincial Park, a provincial park in British Columbia, Canada

== See also ==
- Henry Lake (disambiguation)
- Harold Lake (disambiguation)
