= Lacy Lake =

- Location within Vancouver Island
- Location: Vancouver Island, British Columbia
- Coordinates: 49°18′00″N 124°45′00″W
- Lake type: Natural lake
- Primary outflows: Cold Creek
- Basin countries: Canada

Lacy Lake is a small lake located east of Port Alberni, British Columbia. It lies south east of Esary Lake. It is the main water supply for the Cherry Creek Improvement District.

== Access ==
Lacy Lake can be accessed by following Horne Lake Road, past Horne Lake Caves and across a bridge that is on the left. After approximately one kilometre there is a logging access gate that should be open. After the gate it is another six kilometres to the gate for Lacy Lake. Continue on the main logging road - there is a fork that you need to stay to the left then another fork you need to stay to the right. This is a lovely lake if you just want to go to explore. No fishing or swimming is permitted in Lacy Lake .

== See also ==
- List of lakes of British Columbia
