= Henry Islands =

Islands in Henry Bay, Antarctica

- Location within Antarctica

Geography
- Location: Antarctica
- Coordinates: 66°53′S 120°38′E

Administration
- Administered under the Antarctic Treaty System

Demographics
- Population: Uninhabited

The Henry Islands are a group of four small islands in the western part of Henry Bay, Antarctica. They were delineated from air photos taken by U.S. Navy Operation Highjump (1946–47), and named by the Advisory Committee on Antarctic Names after Wilkes Henry, a midshipman on the sloop Vincennes during the United States Exploring Expedition (1838–42) under Lieutenant Charles Wilkes.

== See also ==
- List of antarctic and sub-antarctic islands
