= Turtle Lake (Vancouver Island) =

Lake in British Columbia, Canada

- Location within Vancouver Island
- Location: Vancouver Island, British Columbia, Canada
- Coordinates: 49°19′37″N 124°57′40″W
- Lake type: Natural lake
- Basin countries: Canada

Turtle Lake is a lake located on Vancouver Island east of Great Central Lake.

== See also ==
- List of lakes of British Columbia
