= Scotland, South Dakota =

- City
- Motto: "Live, Work, Play"
- Location in Bon Homme County and the state of South Dakota
- Coordinates: 43°08′53″N 97°43′11″W
- Country: United States
- State: South Dakota
- County: Bon Homme
- Incorporated: 1885

Government
  - Mayor: Lambo Henry

Area
  - Total: 0.90 sq mi (2.32 km^{2})
  - Land: 0.90 sq mi (2.32 km^{2})
  - Water: 0 sq mi (0.00 km^{2})
- Elevation: 1,348 ft (411 m)

Population (2020)
  - Total: 785
  - Density: 876.7/sq mi (338.49/km^{2})
- Time zone: UTC-6 (Central (CST))
  - Summer (DST): UTC-5 (CDT)
- ZIP code: 57059
- Area code: 605
- FIPS code: 46-57940
- GNIS feature ID: 1267561
- Website: cityofscotland.com

Scotland is a city in Bon Homme County, South Dakota, United States. Its population was 785 at the 2020 census.

== History ==
Scotland was laid out in 1879. Scottish immigrants named it for their native country of Scotland.

== Geography ==
According to the United States Census Bureau, the city has a total area of 0.85 square miles (2.20 km^{2}), all land. South Dakota Highway 25 runs north-south through the town. Lake Henry, a popular local fishing lake, is located just east of Scotland.

== Demographics ==
Historical population
Census	Pop.	Note	%±
1880	150		—
1890	1,083		622.0%
1900	964		−11.0%
1910	1,102		14.3%
1920	1,234		12.0%
1930	1,163		−5.8%
1940	1,204		3.5%
1950	1,188		−1.3%
1960	1,077		−9.3%
1970	984		−8.6%
1980	1,022		3.9%
1990	968		−5.3%
2000	891		−8.0%
2010	841		−5.6%
2020	785		−6.7%
U.S. Decennial Census

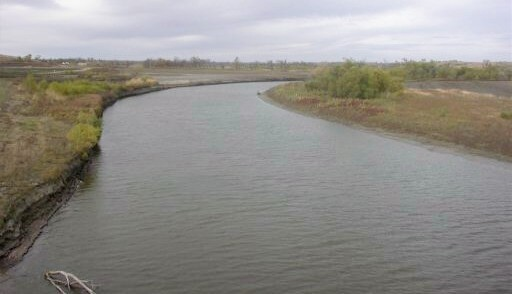
The James River near Scotland, South Dakota

=== 2020 census ===
As of the 2020 census, Scotland had a population of 785. The median age was 49.8 years. 21.4% of residents were under the age of 18 and 30.7% of residents were 65 years of age or older. For every 100 females there were 96.7 males, and for every 100 females age 18 and over there were 95.9 males age 18 and over.

0.0% of residents lived in urban areas, while 100.0% lived in rural areas.

There were 367 households in Scotland, of which 22.6% had children under the age of 18 living in them. Of all households, 39.2% were married-couple households, 25.3% were households with a male householder and no spouse or partner present, and 30.0% were households with a female householder and no spouse or partner present. About 44.1% of all households were made up of individuals and 22.9% had someone living alone who was 65 years of age or older.

There were 438 housing units, of which 16.2% were vacant. The homeowner vacancy rate was 3.0% and the rental vacancy rate was 16.7%.

Racial composition as of the 2020 census
Race	Number	Percent
White	768	97.8%
Black or African American	0	0.0%
American Indian and Alaska Native	7	0.9%
Asian	0	0.0%
Native Hawaiian and Other Pacific Islander	0	0.0%
Some other race	1	0.1%
Two or more races	9	1.1%
Hispanic or Latino (of any race)	10	1.3%

=== 2010 census ===
As of the census of 2010, there were 841 people, 386 households, and 224 families residing in the city. The population density was 989.4 inhabitants per square mile (382.0/km^{2}). There were 455 housing units at an average density of 535.3 per square mile (206.7/km^{2}). The racial makeup of the city was 96.7% White, 1.0% African American, 0.8% Native American, 0.2% Asian, and 1.3% from two or more races. Hispanic or Latino of any race were 0.2% of the population.

There were 386 households, of which 21.0% had children under the age of 18 living with them, 47.7% were married couples living together, 6.7% had a female householder with no husband present, 3.6% had a male householder with no wife present, and 42.0% were non-families. 37.6% of all households were made up of individuals, and 22.1% had someone living alone who was 65 years of age or older. The average household size was 2.08 and the average family size was 2.72.

The median age in the city was 50.3 years. 21% of residents were under the age of 18; 5% were between the ages of 18 and 24; 17.8% were from 25 to 44; 25% were from 45 to 64; and 31.2% were 65 years of age or older. The gender makeup of the city was 46.1% male and 53.9% female.

=== 2000 census ===
As of the census of 2000, there were 891 people and 405 households, out of which 21.7% had children under the age of 18 living with them, 52.6% were married couples living together, 6.7% had a female householder with no husband present, and 38.5% were non-families. 36.0% of all households were made up of individuals, and 25.7% had someone living alone who was 65 years of age or older. The average household size was 2.09 and the average family size was 2.68.

In the city, the population was spread out, with 20.5% under the age of 18, 3.6% from 18 to 24, 19.4% from 25 to 44, 20.2% from 45 to 64, and 36.3% who were 65 years of age or older. The median age was 51 years. For every 100 females, there were 84.1 males. For every 100 females age 18 and over, there were 77.9 males.

The median income for a household in the city was $28,984, and the median income for a family was $34,821. Males had a median income of $27,321 versus $18,542 for females. The per capita income for the city was $15,427. About 7.4% of families and 11.4% of the population were below the poverty line, including 14.1% of those under age 18 and 14.0% of those age 65 or over.

== Education ==
Scotland School District 4-3 operates the town's school.

== Notable people ==
- Robert Dollard, first Attorney General of South Dakota
- Charles D. Gemar, United States Astronaut.
- Ralph Homan, legislator and businessman
- Dick Wildung, American football player.
