= Gracie Lake =

- Location within Vancouver Island
- Location: Vancouver Island, British Columbia
- Coordinates: 49°13′00″N 125°05′00″W
- Lake type: Natural lake
- Basin countries: Canada

Gracie Lake is a lake located on Vancouver Island north west of the north end of Nahmint Lake.

== See also ==
- List of lakes of British Columbia
