= Ralph Homan =

American politician

Member of the South Dakota House of Representatives
- In office 1983–1986

Personal details
- Born: Ralph Duane Homan; November 30, 1928 Scotland, South Dakota
- Died: May 8, 2013 (aged 84) Sioux Falls, South Dakota
- Party: Republican

Military service
- Branch/service: United States Army
- Battles/wars: Korean War

Ralph Duane Homan (November 30, 1928 – May 8, 2013) was an American politician and businessman.

== Background ==
Born near Scotland, South Dakota, on his family's farm, Homan served in the United States Army during the Korean War. Homan was in the auction and land businesses. He served in the South Dakota House of Representatives as a Republican from 1983 to 1986, where he represented Mount Vernon, South Dakota. He died in Sioux Falls, South Dakota.
