= Henry's =

Henry's or Henrys may refer to:

- Henry's (clothiers), a Wichita, Kansas company and AAU powerhouse
- Henry's (electronics retailer), Canada
- Henry's Beer, Wine & Spirits, a New Zealand liquor store chain
- Henrys Lake, Idaho
  - Henry's Lake National Forest, Idaho
- Paul Prosper Henrys (1862–1943), French general

== See also ==
- Henry's Amazing Animals, a Disney Channel children's program
  - Henry's Amazing Golden Gecko Awards
- Henry's Anger, a Canberra heavy metal band
- Henry's Cat, an animated children's television show
- Henry's Dress, a rock band from New Mexico
- Henry's Farmers Market (formerly Boney's Market), a Southern California retailer
- Henrys Fork (Snake River)
- Henry's Fork Caldera, a caldera in Yellowstone National Park
- Henry's Grove, Berlin, Worcester County, Maryland
- Henry's Hamburgers, an American restaurant chain
- Henry's House, a London public relations firm
- Henry's Knob, a superfund site in South Carolina
- Henry's law, a gas law in chemistry
- Sir Henry's, a nightclub in Cork, Ireland
- St. Henry's Church (Bayonne, New Jersey)
- Henry (disambiguation)
