= Marshy Lake =

- Location within Vancouver Island
- Location: Vancouver Island, British Columbia
- Coordinates: 49°19′00″N 124°44′00″W
- Lake type: Natural lake
- Basin countries: Canada

Marshy Lake is a lake located on Vancouver Island south of western end of Horne Lake.

== See also ==
- List of lakes of British Columbia
