= Pelham Range =

Mountain range in British Columbia, Canada

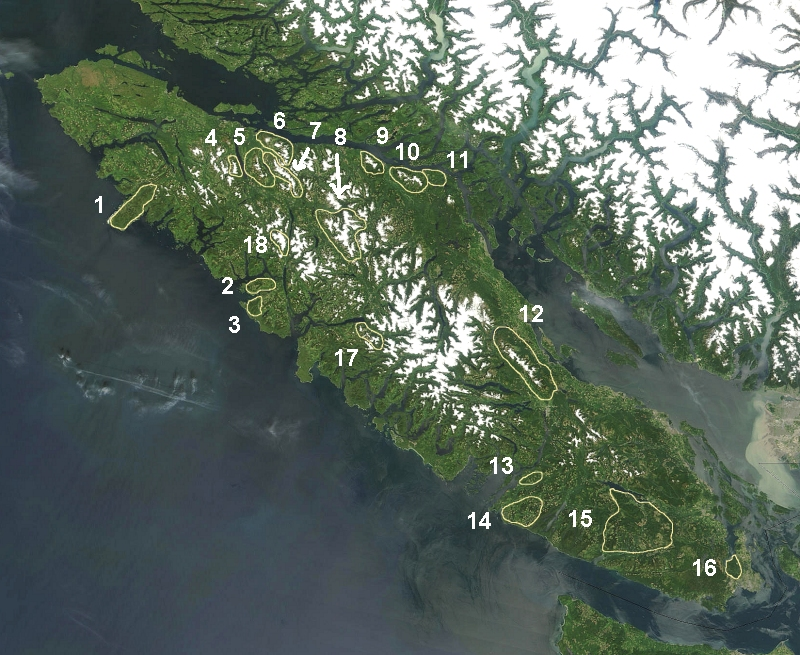
- The Pelham Range is marked 13 on map

Highest point
- Coordinates: 48°56′00″N 124°53′00″W

Dimensions
- Area: 52 km^{2} (20 mi^{2})

Geography
- Location within British Columbia
- Country: Canada
- Region: British Columbia
- Parent range: Vancouver Island Ranges

The Pelham Range is a small mountain range on southern Vancouver Island, British Columbia, Canada, located northeast of Sarita and between the Sarita River and the Alberni Inlet. It has an area of 52 km^{2} and is a subrange of the Vancouver Island Ranges which in turn form part of the Insular Mountains.

== See also ==
- List of mountain ranges
