= Uchuck Lake =

- Location within Vancouver Island
- Location: Vancouver Island, British Columbia
- Coordinates: 49°02′13″N 125°06′22″W
- Lake type: Natural lake
- Basin countries: Canada

Uchuck Lake is a lake located on Vancouver Island north west of head of Uchucklesit Inlet on the north side of lower Alberni Inlet.

== Geography ==
Uchuck Lake is situated within the traditional territory of the Uchucklesaht First Nation on Vancouver Island, British Columbia, Canada. The lake is surrounded by dense coastal temperate rainforests and experiences a humid maritime climate with significant annual precipitation.

== See also ==
- List of lakes of British Columbia
