= Devils Den Lake =

Lake in British Columbia, Canada

- Location within Vancouver Island
- Location: Vancouver Island, British Columbia
- Coordinates: 49°15′00″N 124°52′00″W
- Primary outflows: Heath Creek
- Basin countries: Canada

Devils Den Lake is a small lake located on Vancouver Island four kilometres west of Port Alberni, British Columbia.

== See also ==
- List of lakes of British Columbia
