= List of land districts of British Columbia =

This is a list of land districts of British Columbia, Canada. Land districts are the cadastral system underlying land titles in the province, and used by the provincial gazetteer in descriptions of landforms, administrative areas, and other information. Those on Vancouver Island were established via a Lands Act of the government of the Colony of Vancouver Island, from 1843 onwards; those on the Mainland were established by the Lands Act of 1860 by the Colony of British Columbia.

== List ==
Land District	Location	NTS map	Centre point	References
Alberni	Surrounding Port Alberni	92F Port Alberni	49°15′30″N 124°45′00″W	BC Geographical Names
Barclay	Southwestern side of Vancouver Island	92C Cape Flattery	48°54′00″N 124°58′00″W	BC Geographical Names
Bright	Southeastern side of Vancouver Island	92G Vancouver	49°01′00″N 123°55′00″W	BC Geographical Names
Cameron	Southeastern side of Vancouver Island	92F Port Alberni	49°15′00″N 124°32′00″W	BC Geographical Names
Cariboo	Between Lillooet and Peace River land districts	93H McBride	53°15′00″N 121°15′00″W	BC Geographical Names
Cassiar	Northwestern corner of British Columbia	104H Spatsizi River	57°30′00″N 129°00′00″W	BC Geographical Names
Cedar	Southeastern side of Vancouver Island	92G Vancouver	49°05′30″N 123°49′00″W	BC Geographical Names
Chemainus	Southeastern side of Vancouver Island	92B Victoria	48°54′00″N 123°46′30″W	BC Geographical Names
Clayoquot	Western side of Vancouver Island	92F Port Alberni	49°20′00″N 125°35′00″W	BC Geographical Names
Comiaken	Southeastern side of Vancouver Island	92B Victoria	48°49′30″N 123°37′30″W	BC Geographical Names
Comox	Eastern side of Vancouver Island	92F Port Alberni	49°49′00″N 124°17′00″W	BC Geographical Names
Cowichan Lake	Southeastern side of Vancouver Island	92C Cape Flattery	48°51′00″N 124°06′30″W	BC Geographical Names
Cowichan	Islands and waterways off the southeastern side of Vancouver Island (excluding Saltspring Island)	92B Victoria	48°52′00″N 123°19′00″W	BC Geographical Names
Cranberry	Southeastern side of Vancouver Island	92G Vancouver	49°06′30″N 123°55′00″W	BC Geographical Names
Douglas	Southeastern side of Vancouver Island	92F Port Alberni	49°04′00″N 124°01′30″W	BC Geographical Names
Dunsmuir	Southeastern side of Vancouver Island	92F Port Alberni	49°06′00″N 124°17′00″W	BC Geographical Names
Esquimalt	Southeastern end of Vancouver Island	92B Victoria	48°26′00″N 123°29′00″W	BC Geographical Names
Goldstream	Southeastern end of Vancouver Island	92B Victoria	48°26′00″N 123°35′30″W	BC Geographical Names
Helmcken	Southeastern side of Vancouver Island	92B Victoria	48°41′00″N 123°47′00″W	BC Geographical Names
Highland	Southeastern end of Vancouver Island	92B Victoria	48°30′30″N 123°30′00″W	BC Geographical Names
Kamloops Division Yale	South of Cariboo Land District	82L Vernon	50°40′00″N 119°55′00″W	BC Geographical Names
Kootenay	Southeastern corner of British Columbia	82K Lardeau	50°40′00″N 116°55′00″W	BC Geographical Names
Lake	Southeastern end of Vancouver Island	92B Victoria	48°31′00″N 123°25′00″W	BC Geographical Names
Lillooet	Between New Westminster and Cariboo land districts	92O Taseko Lakes	51°13′00″N 122°40′00″W	BC Geographical Names
Malahat	Southeastern end of Vancouver Island	92B Victoria	48°33′00″N 123°48′00″W	BC Geographical Names
Metchosin	Southeastern end of Vancouver Island	92B Victoria	48°22′30″N 123°33′00″W	BC Geographical Names
Mountain	Southeastern side of Vancouver Island	92F Port Alberni	49°10′00″N 124°01′30″W	BC Geographical Names
Nanaimo	Surrounding Nanaimo as well as islands and waterways off the eastern side of Vancouver Island (excluding Texada Island)	92F Port Alberni	49°29′00″N 124°17′00″W	BC Geographical Names
Nanoose	Southeastern side of Vancouver Island	92F Port Alberni	49°16′00″N 124°16′00″W	BC Geographical Names
Nelson	Southeastern side of Vancouver Island	92F Port Alberni	49°34′00″N 125°06′00″W	BC Geographical Names
New Westminster	Southwestern mainland and offshore islands and waterways	92G Vancouver	49°44′00″N 123°05′00″W	BC Geographical Names
Newcastle	Southeastern side of Vancouver Island	92F Port Alberni	49°27′00″N 124°49′00″W	BC Geographical Names
Nootka	Northwestern side of Vancouver Island	92E Nootka Sound	49°50′00″N 126°16′00″W	BC Geographical Names
North Saanich	Southeastern end of Vancouver Island	92B Victoria	48°39′00″N 123°26′00″W	BC Geographical Names
Osoyoos Division Yale	Between Kootenay and Kamloops Division of Yale land districts	82L Vernon	50°05′00″N 119°10′00″W	BC Geographical Names
Otter	Southern end of Vancouver Island	92B Victoria	48°24′30″N 123°45′00″W	BC Geographical Names
Oyster	Southeastern side of Vancouver Island	92B Victoria	48°59′30″N 123°49′00″W	BC Geographical Names
Peace River	Northeastern corner of British Columbia	94G Trutch	57°25′00″N 122°10′00″W	BC Geographical Names
Quamichan	Southeastern side of Vancouver Island	92B Victoria	48°45′30″N 123°44′00″W	BC Geographical Names
Queen Charlotte	Surrounding Haida Gwaii	103F Graham Island	53°20′00″N 132°10′00″W	BC Geographical Names
Range 1 Coast	Between Lillooet and Rupert land districts	92K Bute Inlet	50°40′00″N 125°35′00″W	BC Geographical Names
Range 2 Coast	West of Lillooet Land District	92M Rivers Inlet	51°25′00″N 126°10′00″W	BC Geographical Names
Range 3 Coast	Between Cariboo and Queen Charlotte land districts	93D Bella Coola	52°25′00″N 126°25′00″W	BC Geographical Names
Range 4 Coast	Between Cariboo and Queen Charlotte land districts	93E Whitesail Lake	53°40′00″N 127°45′00″W	BC Geographical Names
Range 5 Coast	Between Cariboo and Queen Charlotte land districts	93L Smithers	54°35′00″N 127°40′00″W	BC Geographical Names
Renfrew	Southwestern end of Vancouver Island	92C Cape Flattery	48°40′00″N 124°25′00″W	BC Geographical Names
Rupert	Northern end of Vancouver Island	92L Alert Bay	50°20′00″N 127°05′00″W	BC Geographical Names
Sahtlam	Southeastern side of Vancouver Island	92B Victoria	48°45′30″N 123°50′00″W	BC Geographical Names
Saltspring Island	Off the southeastern side of Vancouver Island	92B Victoria	48°48′30″N 123°29′00″W	BC Geographical Names
Sayward	Eastern side of Vancouver Island	92K Bute Inlet	50°11′30″N 125°32′00″W	BC Geographical Names
Seymour	Southeastern side of Vancouver Island	92B Victoria	48°49′30″N 123°50′00″W	BC Geographical Names
Shawnigan	Southeastern end of Vancouver Island	92B Victoria	48°41′00″N 123°37′00″W	BC Geographical Names
Similkameen Division Yale	Between Kootenay and Yale Division of Yale land districts	82E Penticton	49°20′00″N 119°10′00″W	BC Geographical Names
Somenos	Southeastern side of Vancouver Island	92B Victoria	48°49′30″N 123°43′00″W	BC Geographical Names
Sooke	Southern end of Vancouver Island	92B Victoria	48°22′00″N 123°41′00″W	BC Geographical Names
South Saanich	Southeastern end of Vancouver Island	92B Victoria	48°35′00″N 123°25′00″W	BC Geographical Names
Texada Island	In the Strait of Georgia	92F Port Alberni	49°40′00″N 124°23′00″W	BC Geographical Names
Victoria	Southeastern end of Vancouver Island	92B Victoria	48°27′00″N 123°20′00″W	BC Geographical Names
Wellington	Southeastern side of Vancouver Island	92F Port Alberni	49°13′00″N 124°02′00″W	BC Geographical Names
Yale Division Yale	East of New Westminster Land District	92H Hope	49°40′00″N 121°15′00″W	BC Geographical Names

== See also ==
- Land districts of Western Australia

== Notes ==
To see land district boundaries online, consult the province's Online Cadastre System. Land district boundaries can also be viewed in OpenStreetMap.
