= Somass River =

River in British Columbia, Canada

Coordinates: 49°14′46″N 124°49′11″W

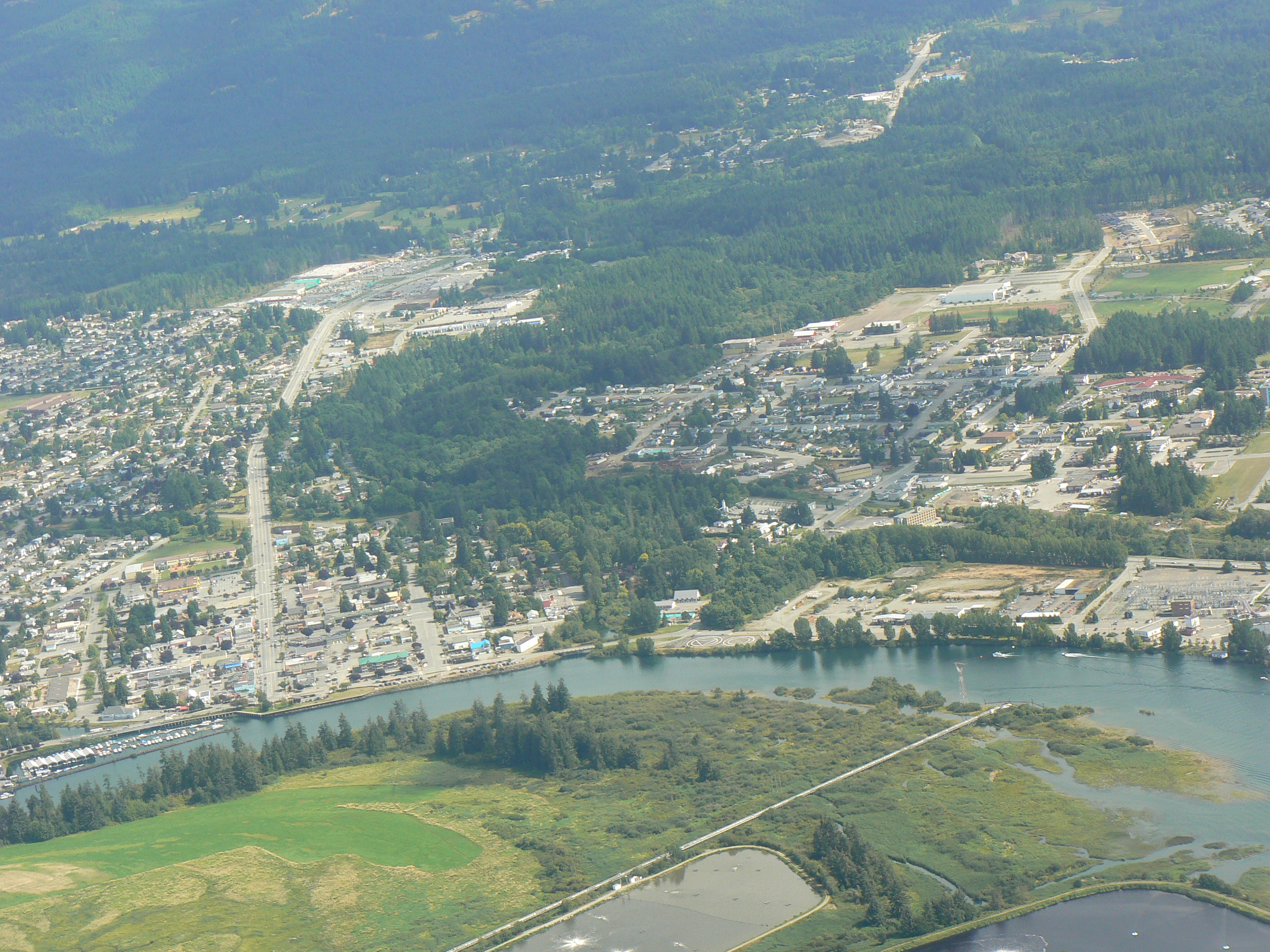
Aerial view of central Port Alberni showing the Somass entering the Alberni Inlet.

Somass River is a river on Vancouver Island, in the Canadian province of British Columbia. Its drainage basin is 1,412 square kilometres (545 sq mi) in size.

The river's name comes from a Nuu-chah-nulth word meaning "washing".

== Course ==
The Stamp River flowing out of Great Central Lake and Sproat River join to form the Somass River, which flows generally southeast and south into Alberni Inlet and the harbour of Port Alberni. The river crosses Highway 4 outside of Port Alberni in Tseshaht First Nation territory. Several kilometres of the lower course of the river are tidal.

== Gallery ==
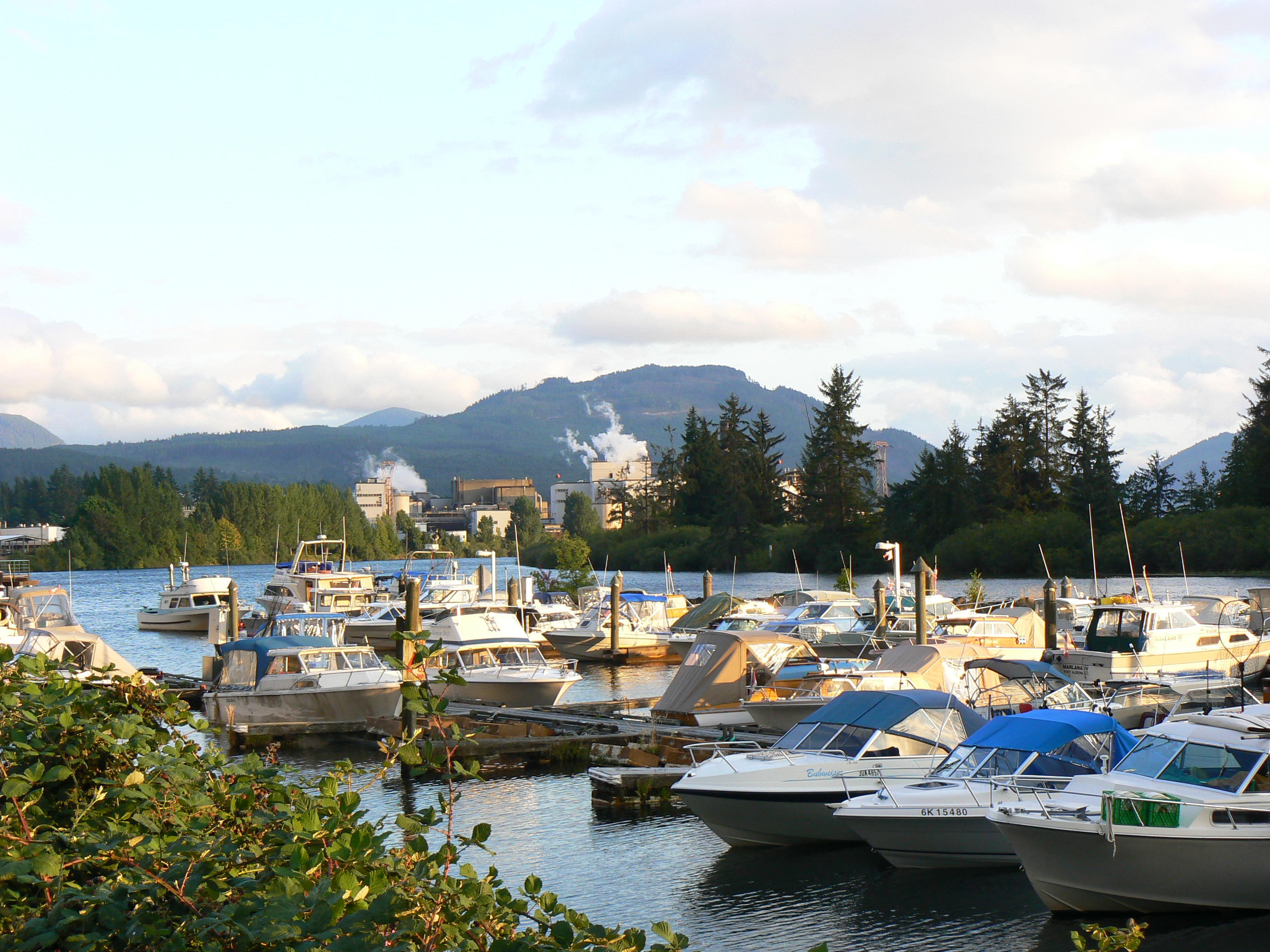
Clutesi Haven Marina in the tidal area of the Somass River

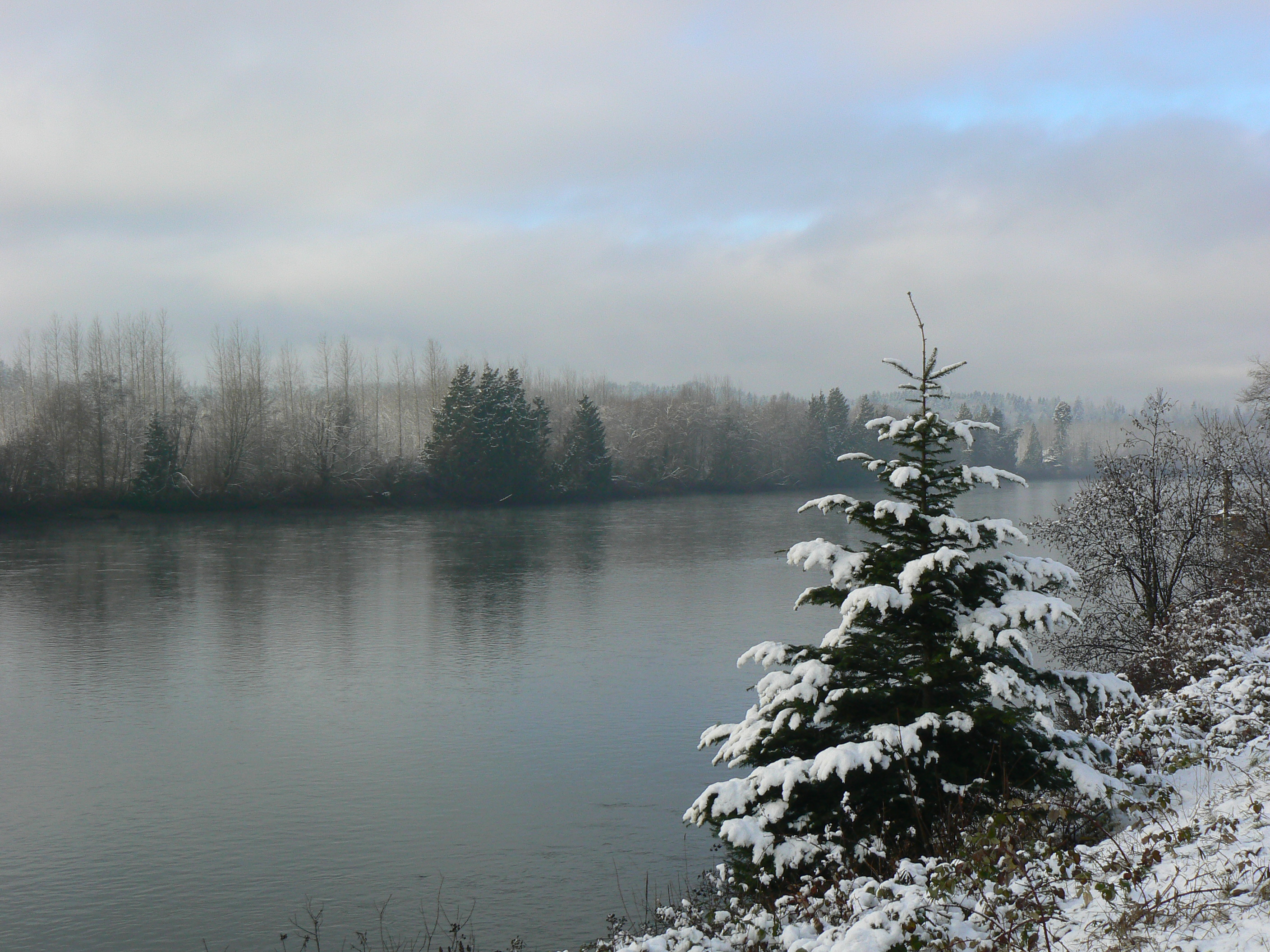
A snowy morning along the Somass

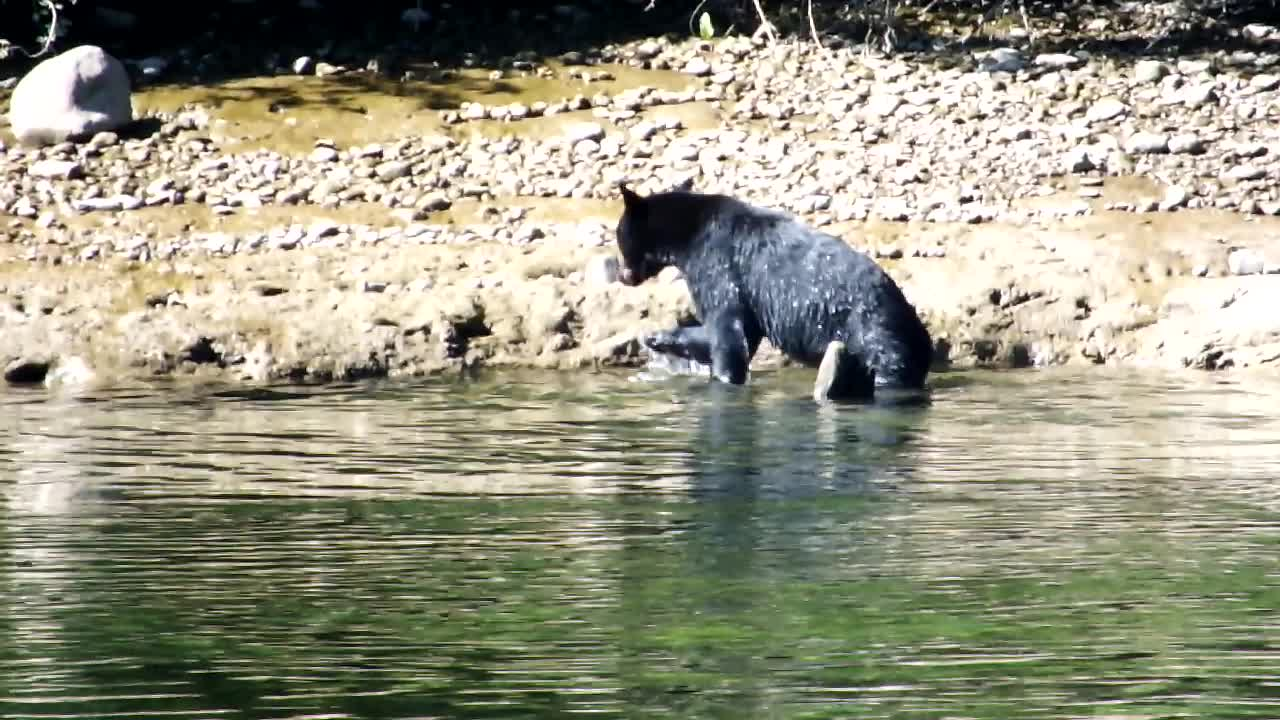
A black bear at low tide

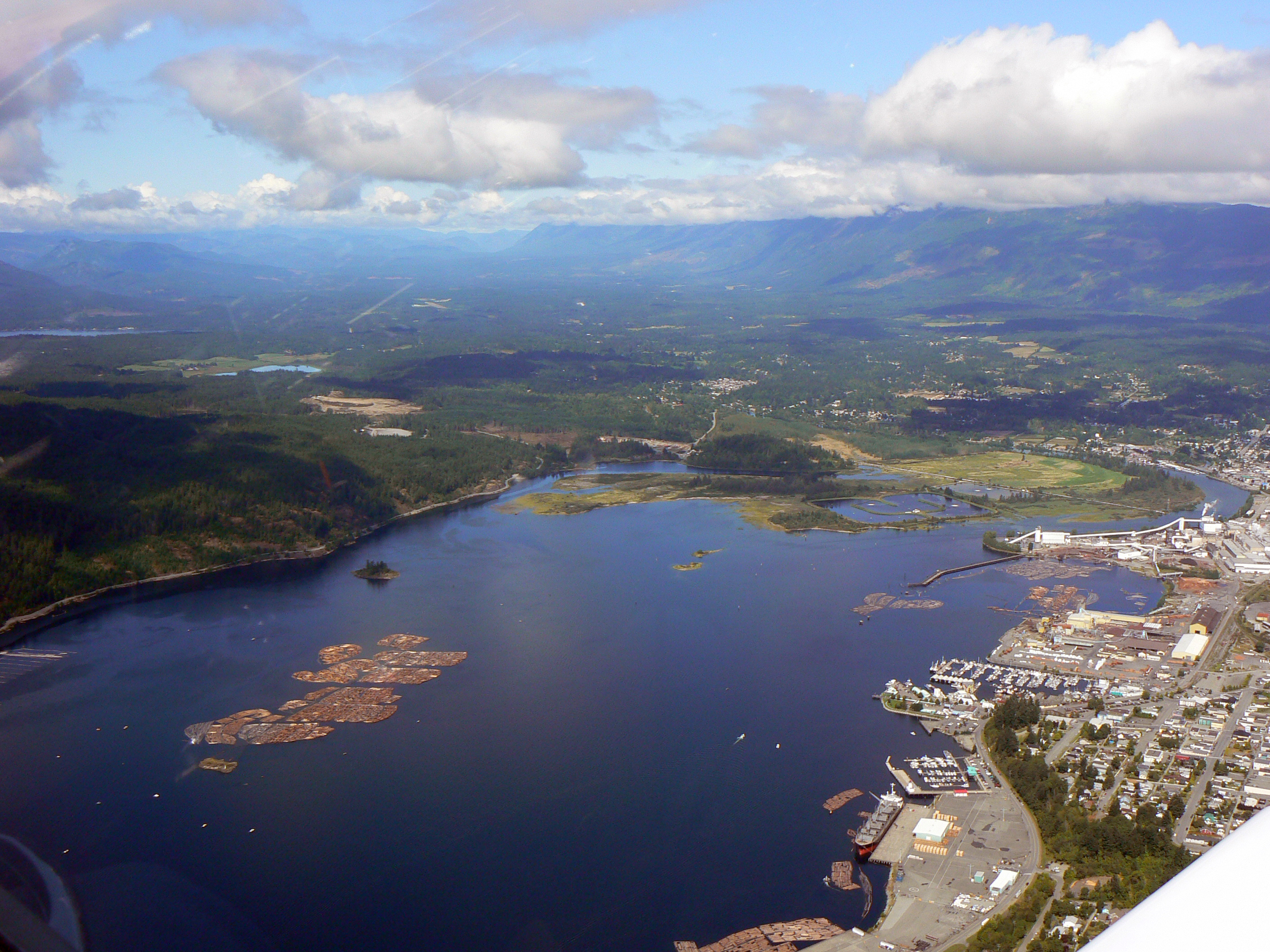
The mouth of the Somass is in the middle-right of this aerial view of Port Alberni harbour

== See also ==
- List of rivers of British Columbia
