= Harold Lake =

Harold Lake may refer to:

- Judge Harold Hamilton, fictional character played by Richard Hamilton (actor)
- H. B. C. Lake, Canadian businessman and politician

== See also ==
- Harry Lake (disambiguation)
