= Esary Lake =

- Location within Vancouver Island
- Location: Vancouver Island, British Columbia
- Coordinates: 49°19′21.1″N 124°46′34.3″W
- Lake type: Natural lake
- Basin countries: Canada

Esary Lake is a small lake located east of Port Alberni, British Columbia, Canada. It lies west of Horne Lake.

== Access ==
Access to the lake is up past horne lake caves left over bridge on the left follow up to logging access gate. 4 kilometers up there is a fork stay to the right Esary lake will be seen on the right. 4x4 required to get to the lake or a short hike from the logging road to the water.

== See also ==
- List of lakes of British Columbia
