= Father and Son Lake =

- Location within Vancouver Island
- Location: Vancouver Island, British Columbia
- Coordinates: 49°06′53″N 124°37′58″W
- Lake type: Natural lake
- Basin countries: Canada

Father and Son Lake is a lake located on Vancouver Island, British Columbia, Canada, at the head of Franklin River.

== See also ==
- List of lakes of British Columbia
