= Henry County =

Henry County is the name of ten counties in the United States of America:

- Henry County, Alabama
- Henry County, Georgia
- Henry County, Illinois
- Henry County, Indiana
- Henry County, Iowa*
- Henry County, Kentucky
- Henry County, Missouri
- Henry County, Ohio
- Henry County, Tennessee
- Henry County, Virginia

All are named in honor of Patrick Henry, of Virginia

- Henry County, Iowa, which is named for General Henry Dodge.
