= Lake Henry (Bon Homme County, South Dakota) =

- Location within South Dakota
- Location: Bon Homme County, South Dakota, United States
- Coordinates: 43.1431319°N 97.7014388°W
- Lake type: Reservoir
- Primary inflows: Dawson Creek
- Primary outflows: Dawson Creek
- Basin countries: United States
- Surface area: 113 acres (46 ha)
- Average depth: 6.6 ft (2.0 m)
- Shore length^{1}: 7 mi (11 km)
- Surface elevation: 1,290 ft (390 m) msl
- References: U.S. Geological Survey Geographic Names Information System: Lake Henry (Bon Homme County, South Dakota)
- ^{1} Shore length is not a well-defined measure.

Lake Henry is a small artificial lake formed by the construction of a dam across Dawson Creek (South Dakota) in Bon Homme County, South Dakota, United States, about 0.75 mi (1.21 km) east of the town of Scotland.

The lake is within the James River watershed. The lake was named in honor of State Senator Henry Brown of Bon Homme County. The original dam was constructed in 1937. By the late 1980s, however, decades of erosion had degraded the lake and use had declined considerably. Plans to renovate the lake began in 1991 after extensive damage to the spillway was discovered. In 1994, the dam was breached and the lake drained to allow spillway repairs and the removal of accumulated sediments. The renovation project quickly ground to a halt when funding was withdrawn and the lake remained dry for nearly a decade. In 2002, funding for the project was restored. It was determined more economical to build a new dam rather than rebuild the old one. A new site was chosen 3/8 mile (0.60 km) downstream and construction began late in 2002. The dam was completed in 2003 and completely filled with water in 2005.

The lake is popular for fishing and recreation in the area. The lake is stocked by the South Dakota Department of Game, Fish, and Parks. Fish species found at Lake Henry include: largemouth bass, yellow perch, channel catfish, black crappie, bluegill, black bullhead, green sunfish, hybrid sunfish, white sucker, and carp. There is a boat ramp with dock on southeast corner with public restrooms. There are two handicapped accessible fishing piers. The entire lake is designated a "no wake zone".

== See also ==
- List of dams and reservoirs in South Dakota
- List of lakes in South Dakota
