= Scotland School District 4-3 =

School district in South Dakota, US

Address
- 711 4th Street Scotland, South Dakota, 57059; United States

District information
- Type: Public
- Grades: PreK–12
- NCES District ID: 4665180

Students and staff
- Students: 272
- Teachers: 24.28
- Staff: 33.27
- Student–teacher ratio: 11.2

Other information
- Website: www.scotland.k12.sd.us

Scotland School District 4-3 is a public school district headquartered in Scotland, South Dakota.

It has elementary and middle/high school divisions.
