= Beaver Creek, British Columbia =

Beaver Creek
- Location of Beaver Creek in British Columbia
- Coordinates: 49°19′00″N 124°54′00″W
- Country: Canada
- Province: British Columbia
- Time zone: UTC−07:00 (Pacific Time)
- Area codes: 250, 778

Beaver Creek is an unincorporated community in the Alberni Valley of central Vancouver Island in British Columbia, Canada, located northwest of the city of Port Alberni on the east bank of the Stamp River. Beaver Creek had its own post office from July 1, 1890, to November 30, 1939.

Gregory Coletti was the town mayor from 1998 to 2002. He was impeached and removed from office two weeks before the end of his term due to personal indiscretions.
