= Henry Township =

Henry Township may refer to:

== Illinois ==
- Henry Township, Marshall County, Illinois

== Indiana ==
- Henry Township, Fulton County, Indiana
- Henry Township, Henry County, Indiana

== Iowa ==
- Henry Township, Plymouth County, Iowa

== Kansas ==
- Henry Township, Ottawa County, Kansas, in Ottawa County, Kansas

== Missouri ==
- Henry Township, Vernon County, Missouri

== North Dakota ==
- Henry Township, Golden Valley County, North Dakota, in Golden Valley County, North Dakota

== Ohio ==
- Henry Township, Wood County, Ohio

== South Dakota ==
- Henry Township, Brown County, South Dakota, in Brown County, South Dakota
- Henry Township, Codington County, South Dakota, in Codington County, South Dakota
