= Adam Grant Horne =

Canadian explorer (1829–1903)

Adam Grant Horne (c. 1829 – 10 August 1901) was a Hudson's Bay Company employee at the Colony of Vancouver Island, a municipal politician and a businessman. He was born in Edinburgh, Scotland and died at Nanaimo, British Columbia. He married Elizabeth Bate whose brother, Mark Bate, also an HBC employee, was the first Mayor of Nanaimo.

Horne arrived in British Columbia as a labourer in 1851 aboard the immigrant ship Tory and was in charge of the company store in Nanaimo when, in 1862, the company sold out. After operating a business on his own account in Nanaimo, he took further employment with the HBC first at its Fort Simpson post and then took charge of its Comox operation from 1865 to 1878 when the post there was closed as well. At that time Horne returned to business on his own account in Nanaimo where he also served as an alderman.

In 1856 Horne led what is thought to have been the first crossing of mid-Vancouver Island by a European. He was to ascertain whether a trail existed from the present location of Qualicum Beach, British Columbia, on Vancouver Island's east coast in the hopes of establishing trade with the Nuu-chah-nulth who lived on the west coast. At the mouth of the Qualicum River, Horne's party and their native guides observed a large fleet of Haida canoes approaching and hid in trees unable to warn the villagers of the impending attack. Afterwards, they observed the attackers as they left holding human heads. When they came to the mouth of the river, they came upon the charred remains of the village of Saatlaam and the mutilated bodies of its inhabitants.

Horne's expedition found the existing trail used by natives as a trade route across the island.

Horne Lake, at the headwaters of the Qualicum River, is named for Horne.

== Sources ==
- Wylie, Brad (2003). Qualicum Beach, A History. Wylie: Qualicum Beach, BC. ISBN 0-9696050-1-3.
- Elms, Lindsay (1996). Beyond Nootka, A Historical Perspective of Vancouver Island Mountains. Misthorn Press: Courtenay, BC. ISBN 0-9680159-0-5.
- Walbran, Captain John T. (1971). British Columbia Place Names, Their Origin and History (Facsimile reprint of 1909 ed.). Vancouver/Toronto: Douglas & McIntyre. ISBN 0-88894-143-9. Archived from the original on 3 March 2016.
- Paterson, TW (1975). Ghost Town Trails of Vancouver Island. Langley, BC: Stagecoach Publishing. ISBN 0-88983-000-2.
