= Labour Day Lake =

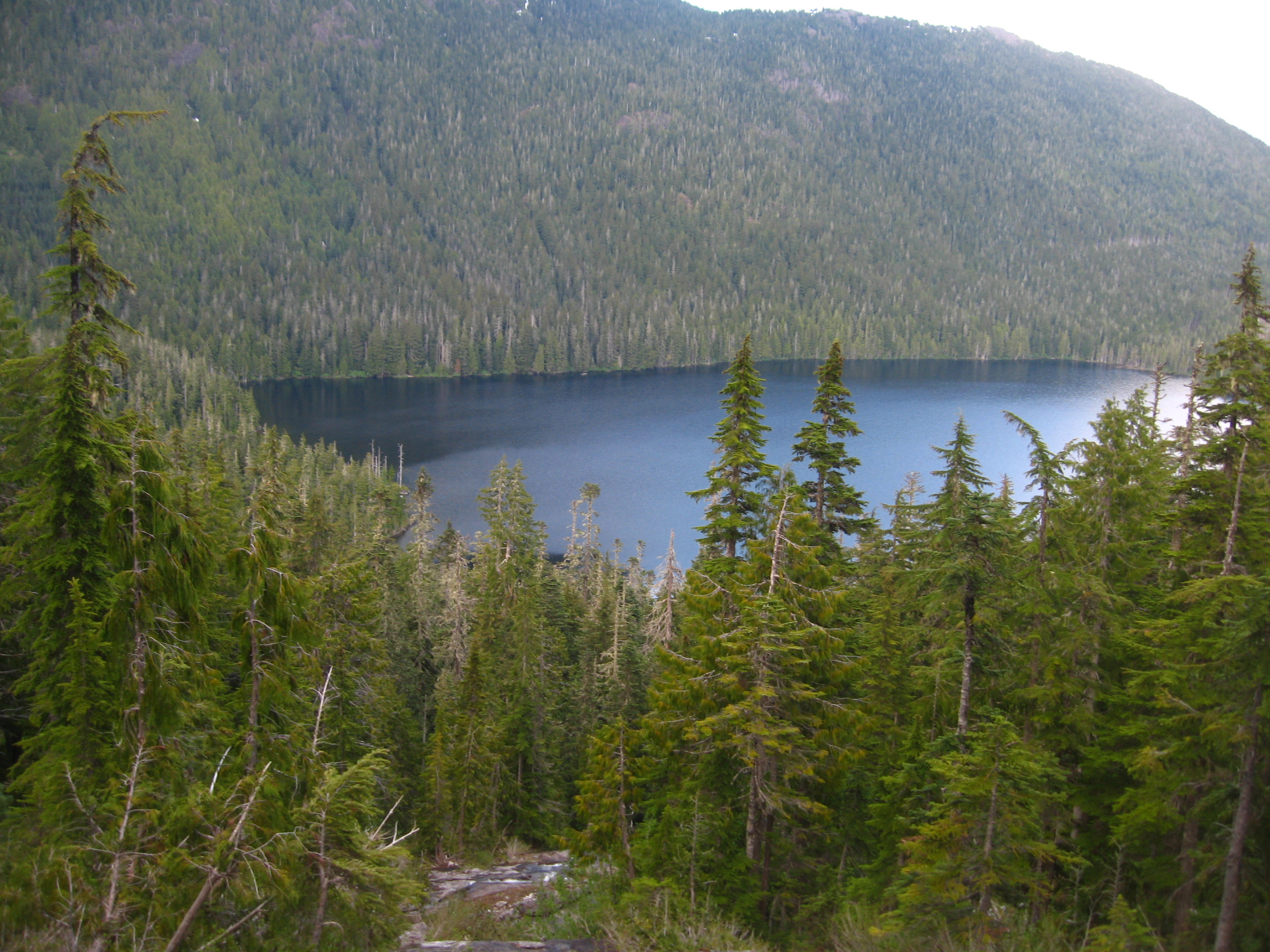
- Labour Day lake from the west

- Location within Vancouver Island
- Location: Vancouver Island, British Columbia
- Coordinates: 49°07′00″N 124°28′00″W
- Lake type: Natural lake
- Primary outflows: Cameron River
- Basin countries: Canada
- Surface elevation: 905 m (2,969 ft)

Labour Day Lake is a lake located on Vancouver Island at the head of the Cameron River.

== See also ==
- List of lakes of British Columbia
