= Henry Bay =

Bay in Antarctica

Henry Bay (66°52′S 120°45′E) is a small bay at the eastern end of the Sabrina Coast, Antarctica, with the Henry Islands lying in its western part. The bay was delineated from aerial photographs taken by U.S. Navy Operation Highjump (1946–47), and named by the Advisory Committee on Antarctic Names for Wilkes Henry, a midshipman on the sloop Vincennes during the United States Exploring Expedition (1838–42) under Lieutenant Charles Wilkes.
