= Cristina Alberini =

Italian neuroscientist

- Education: University of Pavia (BSc); University of Genoa (PhD)
- Known for: Neuroscience
- Awards: Hirschl-Weill Career Scientist Award, NARSAD Independent Investigator Award, Camilo Golgi Medal, Athena Award, MERIT Award
- Scientific career
- Institutions: New York University; University of Brescia; Brown University
- Academic advisors: Eric Kandel
- Website: http://alberinilab.org/

Cristina Maria Alberini is an Italian neuroscientist who studies the biological mechanisms of long-term memory. She is a professor in neuroscience at the Center for Neural Science in New York University, and adjunct professor at the Departments of Neuroscience, Psychiatry, and Structural and Chemical Biology at the Icahn School of Medicine at Mount Sinai in New York.

Her research focuses on understanding the cellular and molecular mechanisms underlying the stabilization, storage, and consolidation of long-term memories. Another part of her research involved the study of memory retrieval and reconsolidation.

In 2017 she was elected to the Dana Alliance for Brain Initiatives and awarded the Lombardy Region Rosa Camuna Award in 2019. In 2022 she was appointed as a Member of the American Academy of Arts and Sciences.

== Biography ==
She studied biology and graduated with honors from the University of Pavia, in Italy. Her undergraduate research focused in the study of antibodies in vitro. She obtained a doctoral degree in immunological sciences from the University of Genoa, where she studied T-cell antigen receptors.

In 1985 she got a post-doctoral research fellowship to work in the Dana–Farber Cancer Institute at Harvard Medical School. Later she obtained a second post-doctoral fellowship to work at Columbia University working in the laboratory of Eric Kandel from 1991 to 1994 where she trained as a neurobiologist. During this time, her research focused in studying the role of gene expression regulation during long-term synaptic plasticity.

In 1997 Cristina joined Brown University as an assistant professor of neuroscience. Years later, in 2001, she moved to the Icahn School of Medicine at Mount Sinai, where she acted as an assistant professor until 2010 when she was promoted to full professor. In 2011 she joined the Center for Neural Science at the New York University as a full professor in neuroscience.

Starting in 2002, she trained as a psychoanalyst at National Association for the Advancement of Psychoanalysis (NPAP) in New York, and became licensed in the same state in 2012. Since then, she became actively involved in the merging of neuroscience and psychoanalysis to promote a comprehensive and multidisciplinary approach to study brain and mind, as well as to facilitate the development of scientifically based psychotherapeutic approaches.

She founded the biotech company Ritrova Therapeutics Inc. in 2020 with the aim of exploring new treatments for neurodegenerative diseases and neurodevelopmental disorders by targeting novel mechanisms of brain protein metabolism regulation.

== Research ==
Her research focusses on the molecular and cellular mechanisms underlying memory and learning processes. Her laboratory studies the stabilization, storage and strengthening of long-term memories, as well as memory retrieval and reconsolidation. Her research team uses mammalian (e.g. mice) and invertebrate systems (e.g. Aplysia californica) to understand these processes. The results of her research may led to therapeutic approaches for memory loss, such as the ones occurring in aging, Alzheimer's disease, or post-traumatic stress disorder (PTSD).

Her early work involved investigations into the impact of the insulin-like growth factor 2 (IGF-II) protein on long-term memory. She showed that the brain produced more IGF-II when it is making memories, and that by increasing the amount of IGF-II it is possible to improve memory function and persistence. Similarly, she demonstrated that blocking the increase of IGF-II stopped the formation of long-term memory. Her research studies on the biological aspects of long-term memory and ways to minimize the fear associated with particular memories, may be an approach to treat people with PTSD.

As a result of her research work, it has been demonstrated that early life experiences impact the biological function and development of the brain. To do so, Cristina's research team has investigated the biological aspects that are related to episodic memories. In one of her publications her and her co-workers conclude:

Memory development is important for thinking, future learning, planning, decision-making, problem solving, reflecting, imagining, and the overall capacity to form a sense of self. We suggest that regulation of infantile learning, especially during learning and memory critical periods, represents an extremely effective tool for preventing numerous psychopathologies.

== Awards and honors ==
Since 2004 she has been an active member of the Council of the Molecular and Cellular Cognition Society. In this society she has acted as treasurer from 2006 to 2009 and as president in the period from 2009 to 2012. She is co-chair of the International Neuropsychoanalysis Society and serves on the Council of The Harvey Society. In 2022 Member of the American Academy of Arts and Sciences.

Throughout her career her research work has been recognized by different institutions with several awards such as:

- NIH MERIT (Method to Extend Research in Time) Award.
- Hirschl-Weill Career Scientist Award.
- Premio ATENEA awarded in 2006.
- Camillo Golgi Medal Award. Awarded in 2011.
- McKnight Foundation Cognitive and Memory Disorders Award. Obtained for the period 2011 - 2013 for her research entitled The Role of Astrocytes in Memory and Cognitive Disorders.
- Prize for American Italian Relations. Obtained in 2016.
- In 2017 she was elected as part of the Council of The Harvey Society.
- In 2017 she was elected a member of the Dana Alliance for Brain Initiatives.
- In 2018 she acted as a Jacob K. Javits visiting professor. Later that year she obtained the NYU Silver professorship.
- Lombardy Region Rosa Camuna Award. Obtained in 2019.
- In 2023 The Neuropsychoanalysis Association awarded her with the Sloan-Menninger-Shevrin Prize as an established researcher.

== Selected publications ==
She is emeritus editor of the scientific journal Hippocampus. According to Scopus, her most important publications are:

- Suzuki, Akinobu; Stern, Sarah A.; Bozdagi, Ozlem; Huntley, George W.; Walker, Ruth H.; Magistretti, Pierre J.; Alberini, Cristina (2011). "Astrocyte-neuron lactate transport is required for long-term memory formation". Cell. 144 (5): 810–823. doi:10.1016/j.cell.2011.02.018. PMC 3073831. PMID 21376239.
- Alberini, Cristina (2009). "Transcription Factors in Long-Term Memory and Synaptic Plasticity". Physiological Reviews. 89 (1): 121–145. doi:10.1152/physrev.00017.2008. PMC 3883056. PMID 19126756.
- Alberini, Cristina (2005). "Mechanisms of memory stabilization: are consolidation and reconsolidation similar or distinct processes?". Trends in Neurosciences. 28 (1): 51–56. doi:10.1016/j.tins.2004.11.001. PMID 15626497. S2CID 18339636.
- Alberini, C.M; Ghirardl, M; Metz, R; Kandel, E.R. (1994). "C/EBP is an immediate-early gene required for the consolidation of long-term facilitation in Aplysia". Cell. 76 (6): 1099–1114. doi:10.1016/0092-8674(94)90386-7. PMID 8137425.
- Milekic, M.H.; Alberini, C.M. (2002). "Temporally graded requirement for protein synthesis following memory reactivation". Neuron. 36 (3): 521–525. doi:10.1016/S0896-6273(02)00976-5. PMID 12408853.
