= Lake Henry (Douglas County, Minnesota) =

Lake in the state of Minnesota, United States

- Location within Minnesota
- Location: Douglas County, Minnesota
- Coordinates: 45°54′8″N 95°22′34″W
- Type: lake

Lake Henry is a lake in Douglas County, in the U.S. state of Minnesota.

Lake Henry was named for the son of a pioneer settler.

== See also ==
- List of lakes in Minnesota
