= Lake Henry (Nova Scotia) =

Lake in Nova Scotia, Canada

- Location within Nova Scotia
- Location: St. Mary's, Nova Scotia
- Coordinates: 45°18′20″N 62°17′14″W
- Basin countries: Canada

Lake Henry is a lake in the municipal district of St. Mary's, in Nova Scotia, Canada.

== See also ==
- List of lakes in Nova Scotia
