= Henry (ship) =

Several ships have been named Henry:

- Henry (1819 ship) was a sailing ship built at Quebec, Canada. She initially sailed between London and Quebec, but then she made two voyages transporting convicts from England to Australia. She was wrecked in the Torres Strait in 1825.
- Henry (1820 ship) was a sloop launched at Plymouth. She sailed to the New South Shetland Islands and returned from there on 12 May 1822. Thereafter she sailed between Plymouth or London and Malaga. She had undergone lengthening in 1824, and conversion to a cutter c.1837. She was last listed in 1843.
- Henry (1826 ship) was a merchant ship built in Buckler's Hard, England. She made one voyage transporting convicts from Mauritius to Australia. She grounded off Fremantle in 1841 and was refloated, only to disappear after leaving Moulmein.
- SS Henry, a Norwegian steam-powered cargo ship best known for being one of the two ships sunk in one of the most controversial incidents in Norway during the Second World War

== See also ==
- HMS Henry (1660)
