= Kammat Lake =

KammatLake
- Location within Vancouver Island
- Location: Vancouver Island, British Columbia
- Coordinates: 49°10′09.4″N 124°35′32.9″W
- Lake type: Natural lake
- Basin countries: Canada

Kammat Lake is a lake located on Vancouver Island at the head of Kammat Creek south of Cameron River.

== See also ==
- List of lakes of British Columbia
