= Henry Creek =

Stream in Kansas, U.S.

Coordinates: 37.985295°N 97.028366°W

Henry Creek is a stream in the U.S. state of Kansas.

Henry Creek was named for Henry Comstock, a pioneer who settled there.

== See also ==
- List of rivers of Kansas
