= Heath Creek =

Stream in Alberta, Canada

Coordinates: 49.76671°N 114.10194°W

Heath Creek is a stream in Alberta, Canada.

Heath Creek has the name of William Heath, a pioneer citizen.

== See also ==
- List of rivers of Alberta
