= Newcastle Land District =

Land district in British Columbia, Canada

Coordinates: 49°27′N 124°49′W

Newcastle Land District is one of 59 land districts of British Columbia, Canada, which are the underlying cadastral divisions of that province. It is located on the southeast side of Vancouver Island.

== See also ==
- List of Land Districts of British Columbia
