= Nahmint Lake =

Lake on Vancouver Island in Canada

- Location within Vancouver Island
- Location: Vancouver Island, British Columbia
- Coordinates: 49°08′00″N 125°00′00″W
- Lake type: Natural lake
- Basin countries: Canada

Nahmint Lake is a lake located on Vancouver Island south of Sproat Lake, north east of Hucuktlis Lake.

== See also ==
- List of lakes of British Columbia
