= Elsie Lake =

- Location within Vancouver Island
- Location: Vancouver Island, British Columbia
- Coordinates: 49°27′00″N 125°08′00″W
- Lake type: Natural lake
- Primary inflows: Upper Ash River
- Primary outflows: Ash River
- Basin countries: Canada
- Max. length: 3.95 miles (6.36 km)
- Max. width: 1.14 miles (1.83 km)
- Islands: 1 island (length 2,665 feet (812 m), width 1,165 feet (355 m)), several islets

Elsie Lake is a lake on Vancouver Island located south east of Comox Lake.

== See also ==
- List of lakes of British Columbia
