= Lake Henry (New Zealand) =

Spring-fed lake in Te Anau, New Zealand

- Location within New Zealand
- Coordinates: 45°25′51.9″S 167°43′02.5″E
- Max. width: 230 m (750 ft)

Lake Henry is a spring-fed lake of approximately 230m in diameter located in Te Anau, New Zealand. It is located south-east of the main township in Ivon Wilson Park.

Fish and Game Southland release trout into the lake on occasions to enhance it as a fishery for younger anglers.
