= Henry Lake (Vancouver Island) =

- Location within Vancouver Island
- Location: Vancouver Island, British Columbia
- Coordinates: 49°10′34.7″N 124°36′55.4″W
- Lake type: Natural lake
- Basin countries: Canada
- Max. length: 4 miles (6.4 km)
- Max. width: 2 miles (3.2 km)

Henry Lake is a lake located on Vancouver Island south of Cameron Lake.

== See also ==
- List of lakes of British Columbia
