= Alberni Inlet =

Fjord in British Columbia, Canada

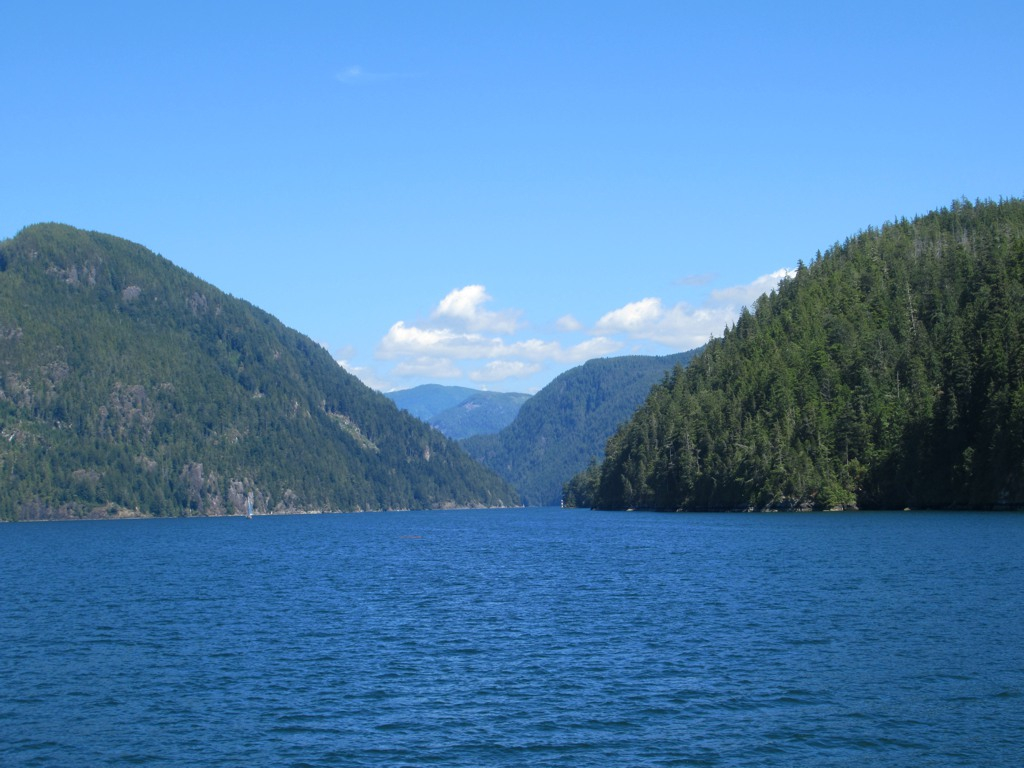
- Alberni Inlet seen from south of Port Alberni in 2020.

- Alberni Inlet on Vancouver Island.
- Location: Vancouver Island, British Columbia, Canada
- Coordinates: 49°03′34″N 124°50′57″W
- Etymology: Pedro de Alberní y Teixidor
- River sources: Somass River
- Primary outflows: Barkley Sound
- Ocean/sea sources: Pacific Ocean
- Max. length: 54.3 km (33.7 mi)
- Max. width: 1 to 2 km (0.62 to 1.24 mi)
- Surface area: 54.9 km^{2} (21.2 mi^{2})
- Max. depth: 300 m (980 ft)
- Settlements: Port Alberni

Alberni Inlet (formerly known as Alberni Canal) is a long, narrow inlet in Vancouver Island, British Columbia, Canada, that stretches from the Pacific Ocean at Barkley Sound about 54.3 km (34 mi) inland terminating at Port Alberni. It was named by the Spanish explorer Francisco de Eliza after Pedro de Alberní y Teixidor, Captain of the Free Company of Volunteers of Catalonia who was appointed in the Spanish fort in Nootka Sound from 1790 to 1792. The inlet includes traditional territories of the Ucluelet, Uchucklesaht, Huu-ay-aht, Hupacasath, and Tseshaht peoples, who are part of the Nuu-chah-nulth Tribal Council people.

== History ==
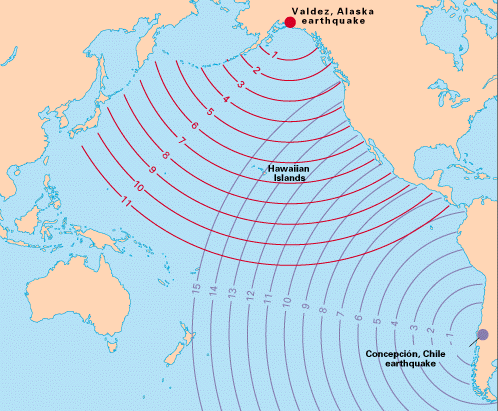
Good Friday Tsunami

Exposed to the open Pacific, Alberni Inlet has been subject to tsunamis. The largest in historic times was the result of the Good Friday earthquake in Alaska in 1964, and destroyed part of downtown Port Alberni.

The narrow inlet amplified the size and intensity of the wave, and when it struck the two towns it had a height of 2.4 metres (8 ft). One hour later, a second, larger wave of 3.0 metres (10 ft) hit. It was the second wave that caused most of the damage, lifting houses off their foundations and sweeping log booms onto the shore. The second wave was followed by four more waves ranging in height from 1.5 to 1.8 metres (5–6 ft) and occurring at roughly 90-minute intervals. In total, the tsunami washed away 55 homes and damaged 375 others.

Tsunamis repeatedly hit the First Nations village Huu-ay-aht of Sarita, which is on a low sand beach about halfway along the inlet's eastern shore.

=== Name Change ===
In 1931 there was a recommendation that the name be changed from canal to inlet so that foreign shippers would not mistake it for a canal. As described by the BC Geographical Names Information System:

First labelled Canal de Alberni on Spanish charts. In 1931 H.D.Parizeau, Hydrographic Service recommended that the ambiguous term 'canal' be changed to 'inlet', "...it is most important for the foreign trade existing between Port Alberni and the outside world, that this word canal, which is greatly mistaken, should be changed for the proper word of inlet. It is needless to tell you that a great difficulty of this word canal comes in with the foreign shipping in general, who figure themselves the extra expense and the danger attached to sending their ships through a canal; for they figure that Alberni Canal is something similar to Manchester Canal, Panama Canal and Suez Canal, where extra fees for pilotage, canal dues, extra insurance and so forth come into the question."

The name change was officially approved in 1945.

Other inlets on the Northwest Coast continue to use "canal" names including Lynn Canal, Portland Canal and Hood Canal.

== Geography ==
Alberni Inlet extends into Vancouver Island from Barkley Sound, an inlet of the Pacific Ocean on the west coast of the island. The inlet is narrow for its entire length, generally reaching a width of 1 to 2 km (0.6 to 1 mi). Shallow areas separate the waters into two basins, one near the entrance from Barkley Sound reaching a depth of 40 m (130 ft) and another near Sproat Narrows that is 37 m (121 ft) deep. The outer basin is the larger of the two.

The outer bar is cut by an 88 m (289 ft) deep channel allowing for water exchange between the sound and the outer basin. Despite the shallow depth of the sill midway up the inlet, deep water in both basins is renewed annually, a process driven by upwelling in the ocean to the west of Vancouver Island.

The Somass River enters at Port Alberni near the inlet's terminus. Numerous small streams enter it on both sides along the length of the inlet. The inlet splits the Pelham Range.

== Geology ==
Alberni Inlet is a fjord cut by an outlet glacier draining from Pleistocene-age ice caps in the mountainous interior of Vancouver Island and later flooded during the sea level rise at the end of the Last Glacial Maximum. The surrounding land is composed of Wrangellia Terrane, constituting the remnants of an island volcanic arc that started forming approximately 300 million years ago and seafloor flood basalts from about 230 million years ago. Periods of dormancy created layers of sediment embedded between lava flows.

After these events, Wrangellia accreted to the North American Plate along the west coast of the continent from Vancouver Island to what is now Alaska. Rocks from this and the remnants of the Bonanza Island Arc which overlays Wrangellia are exposed along Alberni Inlet. Today, the inlet lies near where the Juan de Fuca Plate, Explorer Plate, and North American Plate meet along the Cascadia subduction zone.
