= Horne Lake =

Lake in British Columbia, Canada

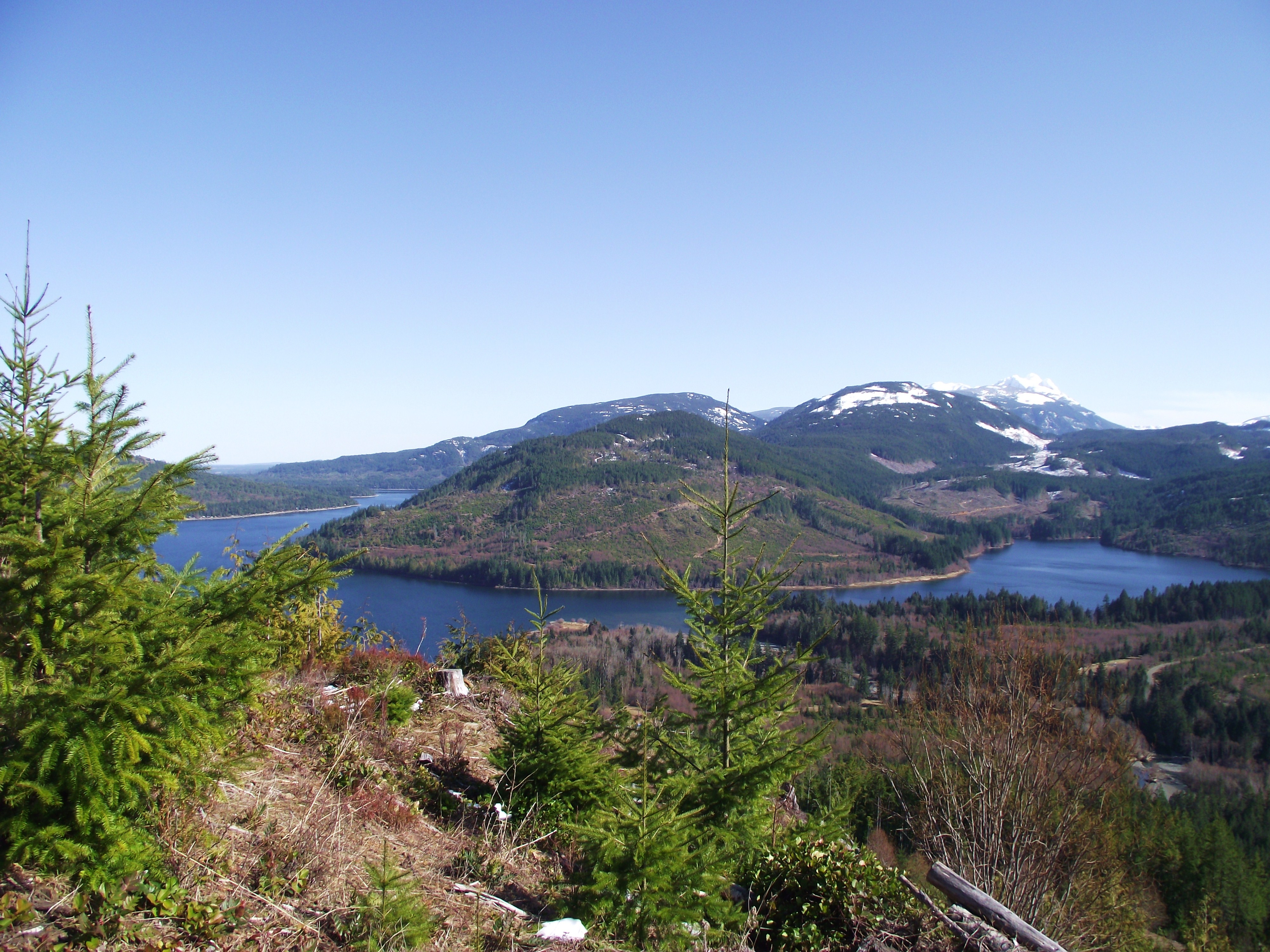
- Horne Lake viewed from Mt. Mark, looking southeast

- Location within Vancouver Island
- Location: Vancouver Island, British Columbia
- Coordinates: 49°20′00″N 124°42′00″W
- Lake type: Natural lake
- Basin countries: Canada

Horne Lake is a lake in Canada's central Vancouver Island, situated between Mount Mark to the north and Mount Horne and Mount Wesley to the south. Its size is approximately 815 hectares (2,010 acres).

It is both fed and drained by the Qualicum River or Big Qualicum River, which flows to the northeast to Qualicum Bay. Its outflow is controlled by a dam for the purpose of salmon habitat enhancement. Horne Lake is part of the Big Qualicum water region within the traditional territories of the Qualicum First Nation and the Kʼómoks First Nation.

Horne Lake is principally accessed by Horne Lake Road from Highway 19.

At the west end of Horne Lake sits Horne Lake Caves Provincial Park and Horne Lake Regional Park, a 105-hectare park and campground. Recreation facilities at the regional park include boating, camping, trails, and paddling.

Originally known as Enoksasant, Horne Lake is named after Adam Grant Horne, Hudson's Bay Company storekeeper at Nanaimo, who made the first recorded sighting of this lake in 1856.

== See also ==
- List of lakes of British Columbia
