= Great Central Lake =

Lake on Vancouver Island in British Columbia, Canada

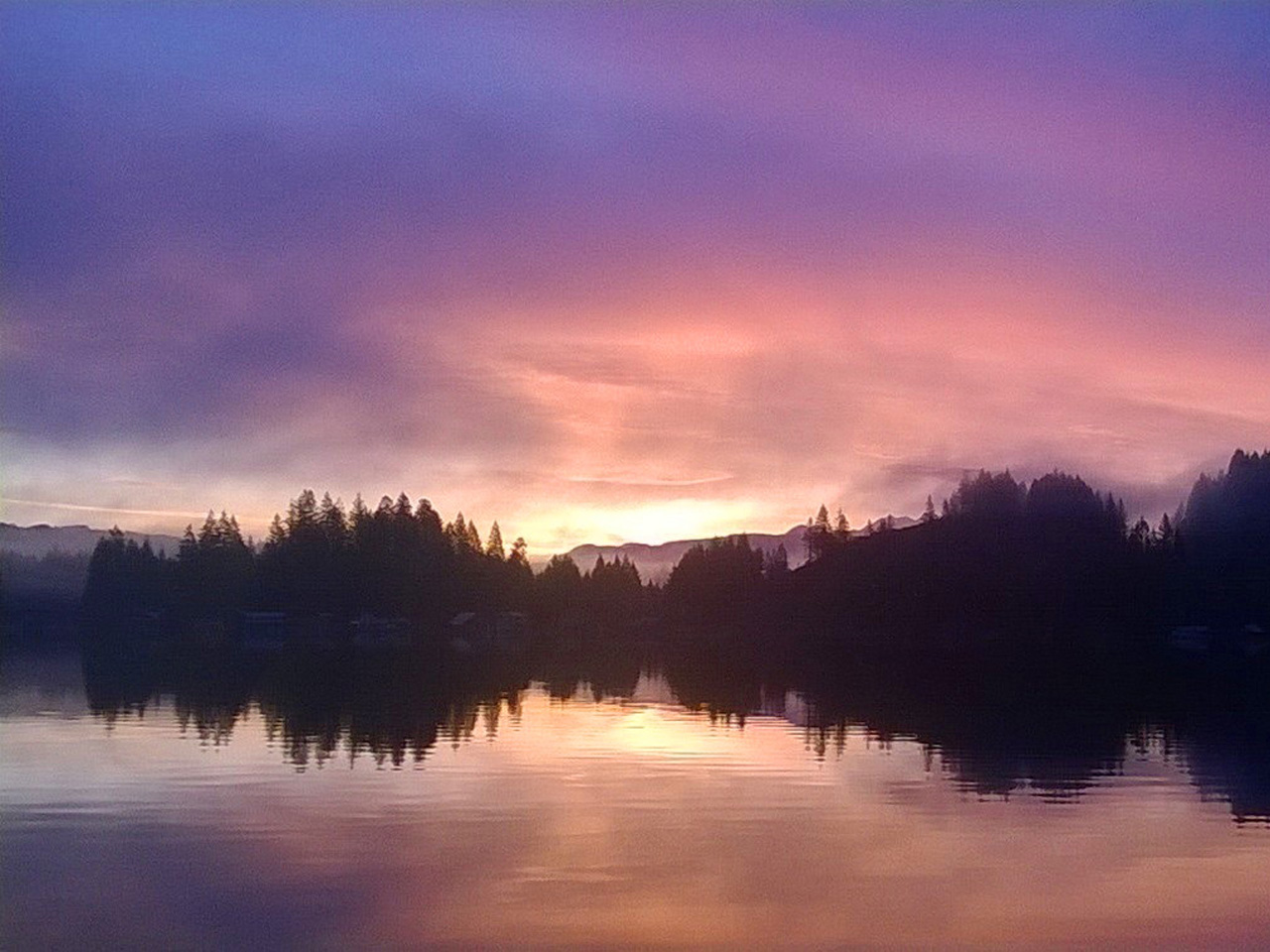
- Sunset at Great Central Lake

- Location within Vancouver Island
- Location: Vancouver Island, British Columbia
- Coordinates: 49°22′05″N 125°11′45″W
- Type: Natural lake, Reservoir
- Primary outflows: Stamp River, Somass River
- Basin countries: Canada
- Max. length: 45 km (28 mi)
- Max. width: 2.45 km (1.52 mi)
- Surface area: 50.85 km^{2} (19.63 sq mi)
- Average depth: 124 m (407 ft)
- Max. depth: 250 m (820 ft)
- Water volume: 6.31 km^{3} (1.51 cu mi)
- Shore length^{1}: 82.3 km (51.1 mi)
- Surface elevation: 85 m (279 ft)
- Islands: One island and numerous islets
- ^{1} Shore length is not a well-defined measure.

Great Central Lake is a lake on Vancouver Island, British Columbia, Canada. It is located north of Sproat Lake and to the northwest of the city of Port Alberni. It is 45 kilometres (28 mi) long, with an area of 50.85 square kilometres (19.63 sq mi) and mean depth of 124 metres (407 ft), to a maximum of 250 metres (820 ft), making it the second deepest lake on Vancouver Island. The lake is long and narrow, with the exception of Trestle Bay located on the east end of the lake. It is nestled beneath low mountains, with second-growth forest surrounding most of the lake. The water level is controlled by a dam on the east side.

There are approximately 70 residents that live in float houses along the shoreline. Fishing, boating, skiing, wakeboarding, swimming, hiking, camping, and ATVing are common activities on and around the lake.

== Geography ==
Great Central Lake is an oligotrophic lake on Vancouver Island. Located north of Sproat Lake and to the northwest of the city of Port Alberni, it is 45 kilometres (28 mi) long, with an area of 50.85 square kilometres (19.63 sq mi) and mean depth of 124 metres (407 ft), to a maximum of 250 metres (820 ft), making it the second deepest lake on Vancouver Island. The lake is long and narrow, with the exception of Trestle Bay located on the east end of the lake. It is nestled beneath low mountains, with second-growth forest surrounding most of the lake. The relatively steep shoreline has kept Great Central Lake mostly undeveloped, but there are approximately 70 residents that live in float houses along the shoreline. The water level is controlled by a dam on the east side.

Fishing, boating, skiing, wakeboarding, swimming, hiking, camping, and ATVing are common activities carried out on and around the lake. Notable features of Great Central Lake and the immediate surroundings include the natural waterslides at Dorothy Creek and Della Falls, as well as the city of Port Alberni. The waters of the lake are clear with a typical Secchi depth of 15.5 metres (51 ft). Great Central Lake is the headwaters of the Stamp River, a popular location for steelhead salmon fishing.

== History ==
The name "Central Lake" appeared in the Vancouver Island Exploring Expedition route plan in 1864. A map of British Columbia from 1871 first referred to it as "Great Central" lake and the name was officially adopted in 1948.

From 1970 to 1974 the lake was fertilized annually in an experiment to enhance the production of sockeye salmon.

== Della Falls Trail ==
Della Falls is one of the highest waterfalls in Canada at 440 metres (1,440 ft). The Della falls trail is a 7-hour hike to the base of Della Falls in Strathcona Provincial Park and is only accessible by boat or water taxi. There are multiple campsites along the trail.

== Nearby Urban Centres ==
Port Alberni is Great Central Lake's closest urban center, approximately 16 kilometers away from the Great Central Lake RV Resort campsite. Port Alberni offers various services including kayak rentals, paddle board rentals, grocery stores, and fishing charters and equipment suppliers.

== See also ==
- List of lakes of British Columbia
