= Muriel =

Muriel may refer to:

== Places ==
- Muriel de Zapardiel, a municipality in the province of Valladolid, Spain
- Muriel, Guadalajara, Spain, a hamlet
- Muriel, Zimbabwe, a settlement
- Muriel Lake, British Columbia, Canada
- Muriel Lake (Alberta), Canada
- Muriel Peak, a summit in California
- 2982 Muriel, an asteroid

== People and fictional characters ==
- Muriel (given name), including a list of people and fictional characters with this name
- Muriel (surname), a list of people
- Muriel (footballer), Brazilian football goalkeeper Muriel Gustavo Becker (born 1987)

== Other uses ==
- Muriel (angel), a Western Christian Domination or Dominion
- Muriel (film), a 1963 French film
- "Muriel", a song on the Tom Waits 1977 album Foreign Affairs
- Muriel (fishing trawler), a New Zealand trawler built in 1907
- Cyclone Maggie/Muriel (1971), in the Indian Ocean
- Muriel Cigars, an American brand of machine-rolled cigars

== See also ==
- Marial (disambiguation)
- Mariel (disambiguation)
- Morial, a surname
