= List of storms named Ginette =

The name Ginette has been used for two tropical cyclones in the South-West Indian Ocean:

- Moderate Tropical Storm Ginette (1965) – a weak and short-lived tropical cyclone which formed in the Mozambique Channel and struck southwestern Madagascar shortly thereafter.
- Tropical Cyclone Myrtle–Ginette (1971) – a strong tropical cyclone that originated from the Australian region and crossed to the South-West Indian Ocean, eventually brushing the southern portions of Réunion and Rodrigues.
