= Almiruete =

- Village
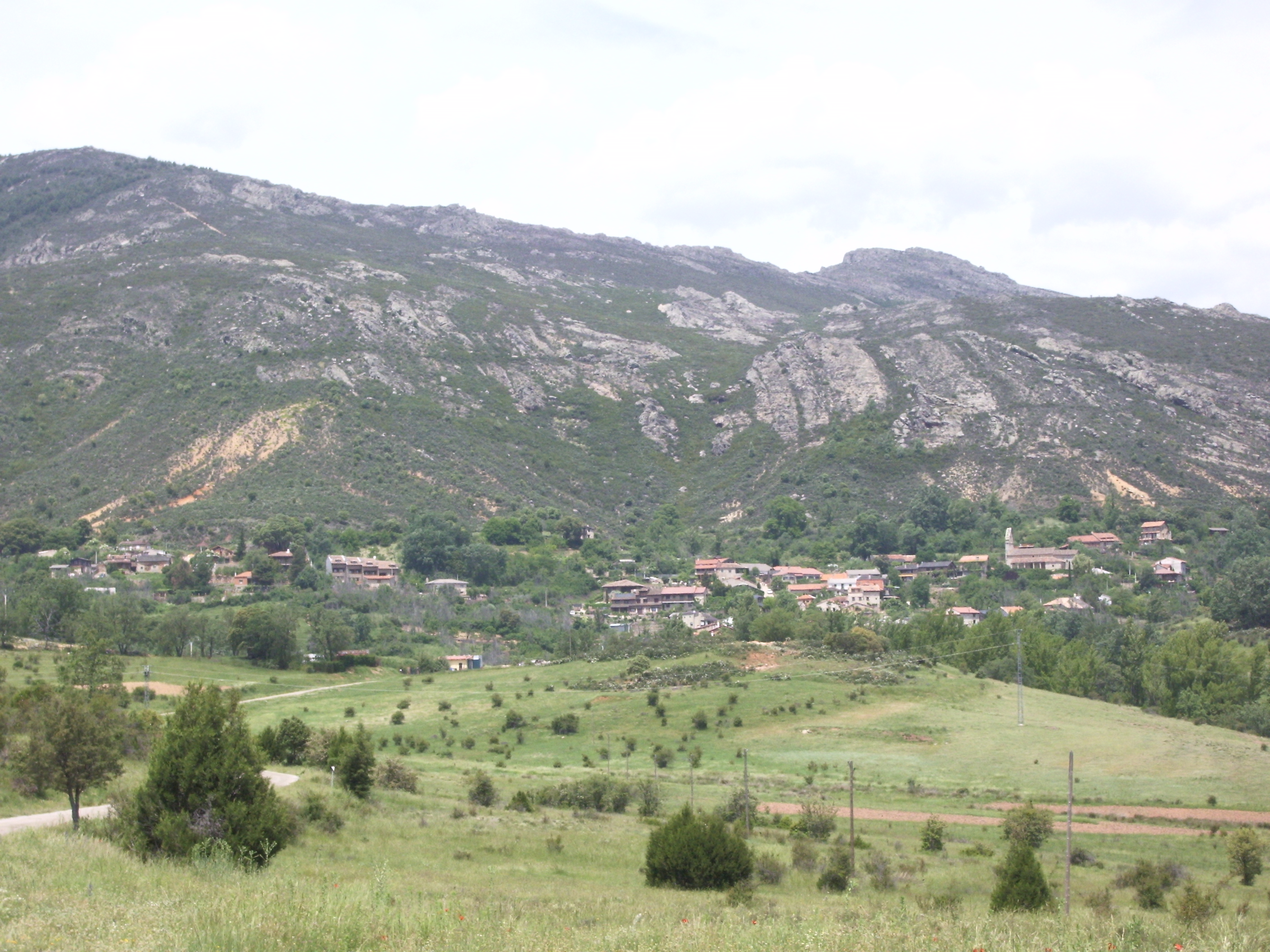

- Location within Province of Guadalajara Location within Spain
- Coordinates: 41°2′52″N 3°13′34″W
- Country: Spain
- Autonomous community: Castilla–La Mancha
- Province: Province of Guadalajara
- Municipality: Tamajón
- Elevation: 1,085 m (3,560 ft)

Population
  - Total: 13

Almiruete is a hamlet located in the municipality of Tamajón, in Guadalajara province, Castilla–La Mancha, Spain. As of 2020, it has a population of 13.

== Geography ==
Almiruete is located 54 km north of Guadalajara, Spain.
