= Tamajón =

Tamajón, Spain
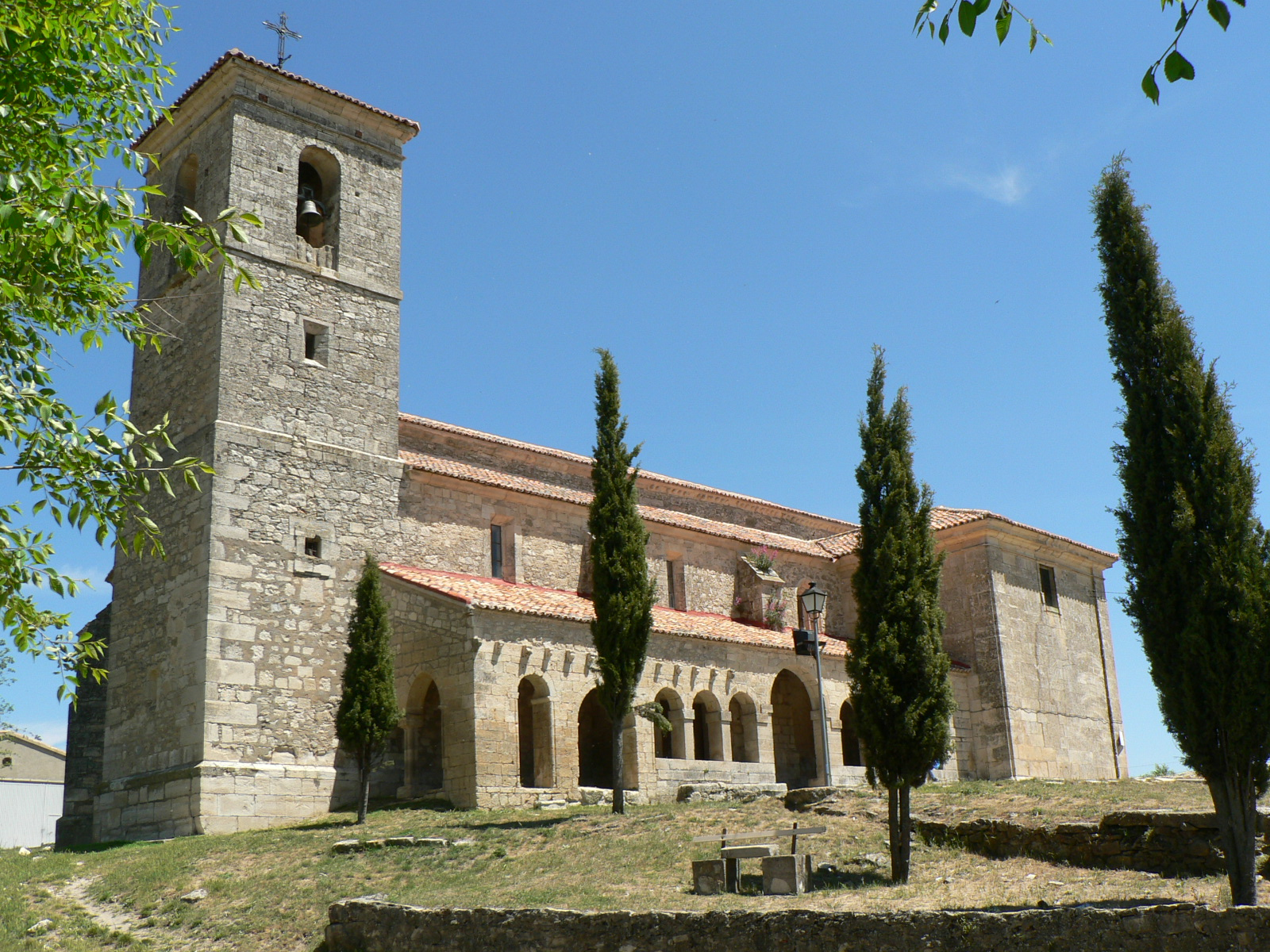

- Coat of arms

- In Giadalajara Province

- Location within Province of Guadalajara Location within Castilla-La Mancha Location within Spain
- Country: Spain
- Autonomous community: Castile-La Mancha
- Province: Guadalajara
- Municipality: Tamajón

Government
  - Mayor: Eugenio Esteban de la Morena

Area
  - Total: 116.28 km^{2} (44.90 sq mi)
- Elevation: 1,030 m (3,380 ft)

Population (2025-01-01)
  - Total: 153
  - Density: 1.32/km^{2} (3.41/sq mi)
- Time zone: UTC+1 (CET)
  - Summer (DST): UTC+2 (CEST)

Tamajón is a municipality located in the province of Guadalajara, Castile-La Mancha, Spain. According to the 2006 census (INE), the municipality had a population of 205 inhabitants and has a surface area of 116.28 km^{2}.The inhabitants are called Agallonero-a. It comprises the town of Tamajón and the villages of Almiruete, Palancares and Muriel. A 16th-century church, dedicated to the Asunción de Nuestra Señora, overlooks the entrance to the town.

Two kilometres to the north is the Hermitage of the Virgen de los Enebrales, the local Patron saint. Built in the 16th century, it was extended in the 18th century.

The "Enchanted City of Tamajón" is also close by, an area where the local limestone has been eroded and forms fanciful shapes and caves.
