= Palancares =

- Village
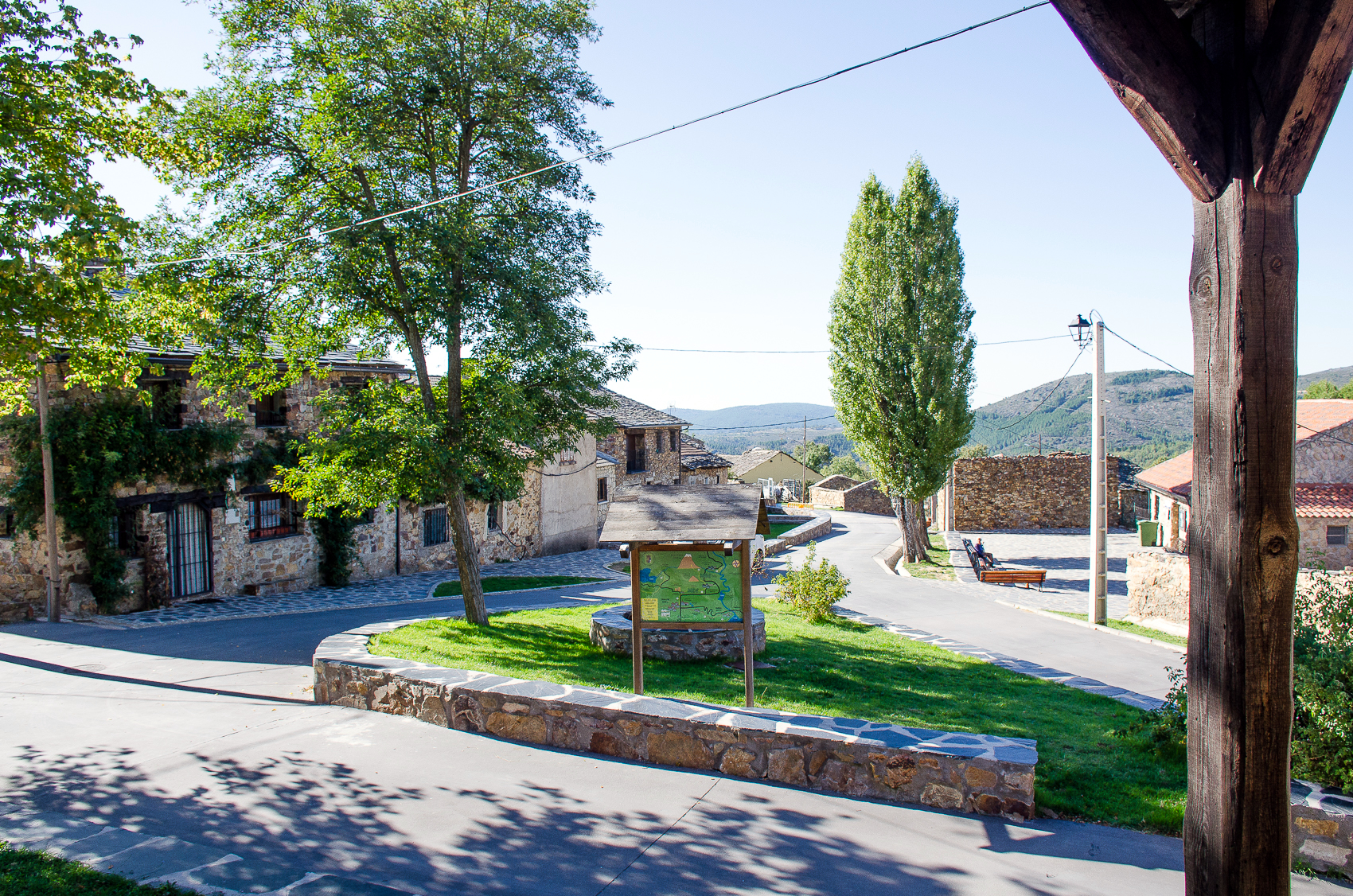

- Location within Province of Guadalajara Location within Spain
- Coordinates: 41°4′47″N 3°12′14″W
- Country: Spain
- Autonomous community: Castilla–La Mancha
- Province: Province of Guadalajara
- Municipality: Tamajón
- Elevation: 1,204 m (3,950 ft)

Population
  - Total: 12

Palancares is a hamlet located in the municipality of Tamajón, in Guadalajara province, Castilla–La Mancha, Spain. As of 2020, it has a population of 12.

== Geography ==
Palancares is located 63 km north of Guadalajara, Spain.
