= 1970–71 South Pacific cyclone season =

Tropical cyclone season

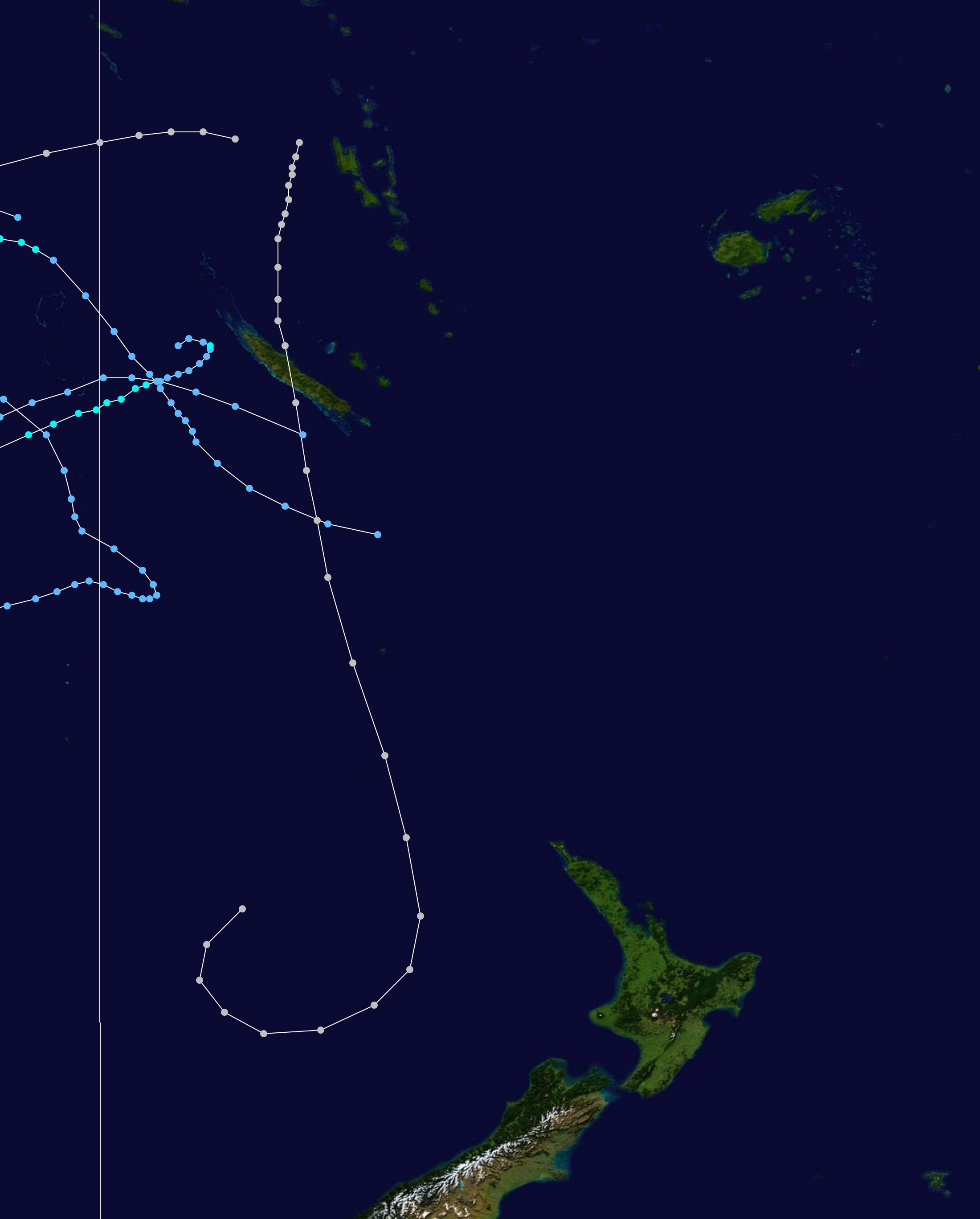
- Season summary map

Seasonal boundaries
- First system formed: December 15, 1970
- Last system dissipated: April 19, 1971

Strongest storm
- Name: Lena
  - Maximum winds: 95 km/h (60 mph) (10-minute sustained)
  - Lowest pressure: 980 hPa (mbar)

Seasonal statistics
- Total disturbances: 6
- Tropical cyclones: 5
- Severe tropical cyclones: 0
- Total fatalities: Unknown
- Total damage: Unknown

Related articles
- 1970–71 Australian region cyclone season; 1970–71 South-West Indian Ocean cyclone season

The 1970–71 South Pacific cyclone season, in terms of severe tropical cyclones, was the least active season on record, with none of its six storms strengthening above Category 2 tropical cyclone intensity. It was a below average season, beginning late and ending early. The season officially began on November 15 and ended on April 30, but the first storm formed a month after that, on December 15.

== Systems ==
=== Tropical Cyclone Priscilla ===
- Category 1 tropical cyclone (Australian scale)
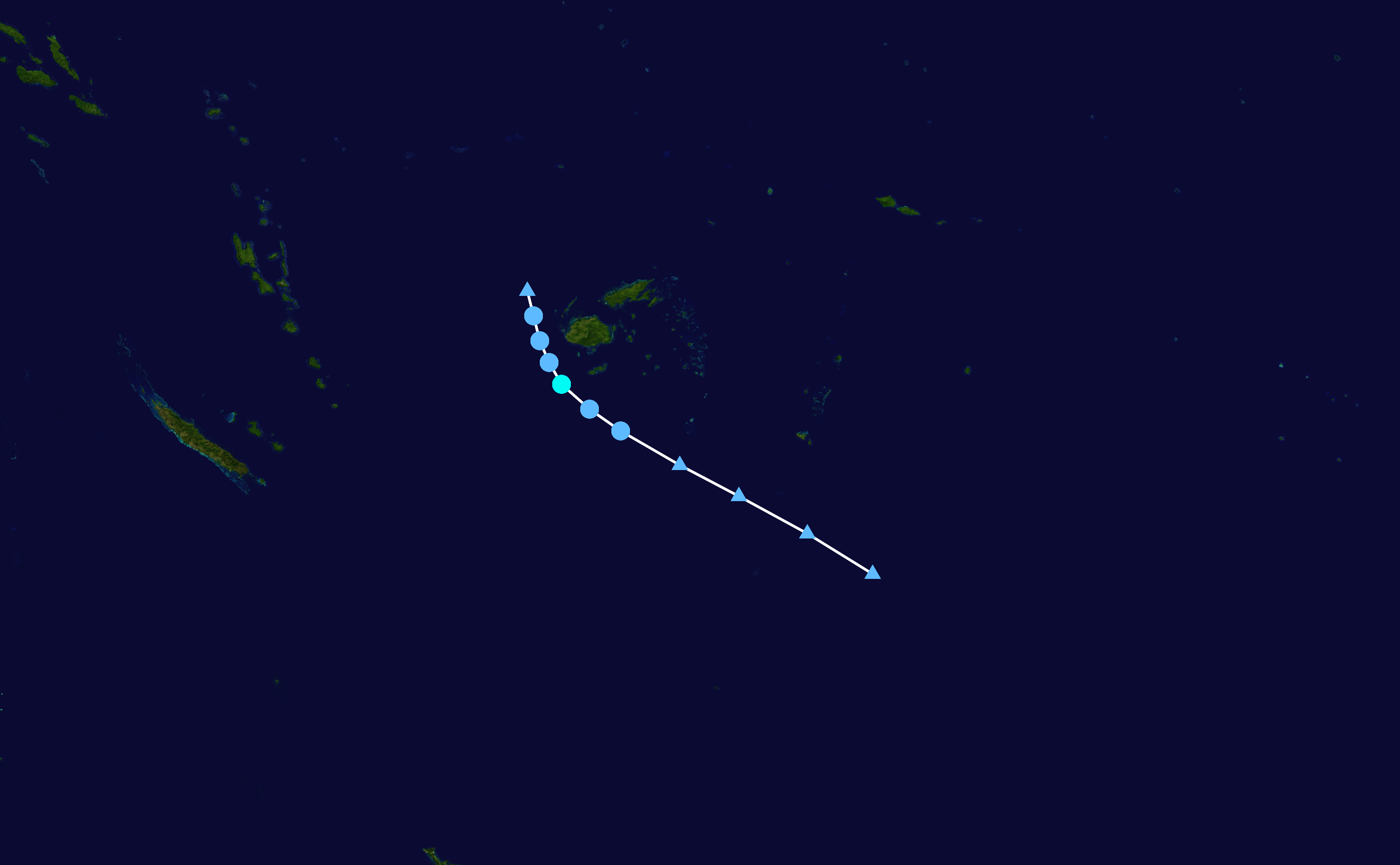
- Duration: December 15 – December 19
- Peak intensity: 75 km/h (45 mph) (10-min); 990 hPa (mbar)

During December 15, a small tropical depression developed about 278 km (175 mi) to the north of Yasawa-i-Rara in Fiji's Yasawa Islands. Over the next day, the system drifted westwards, before it started to move southwards and intensify further. The system subsequently became equivalent to a modern-day category 1 tropical cyclone, with 10-minute sustained wind speeds of 75 km/h (45 mph) during December 17. During that day, the system passed about 95 km (60 mi) to the west of Nadi and started to move south-eastwards and passed well to the south of Ono-I-Lau during December 18. The system was last noted during the next day, after it had moved below 25S and out of the tropics. It was thought that the system caused gale-force winds in parts of Viti Levu, Vatulele, Kandavu and the Yasawa and Mamanutha group of islands.

=== Tropical Cyclone Rosie ===
- Category 1 tropical cyclone (Australian scale)
- Tropical storm (SSHWS)
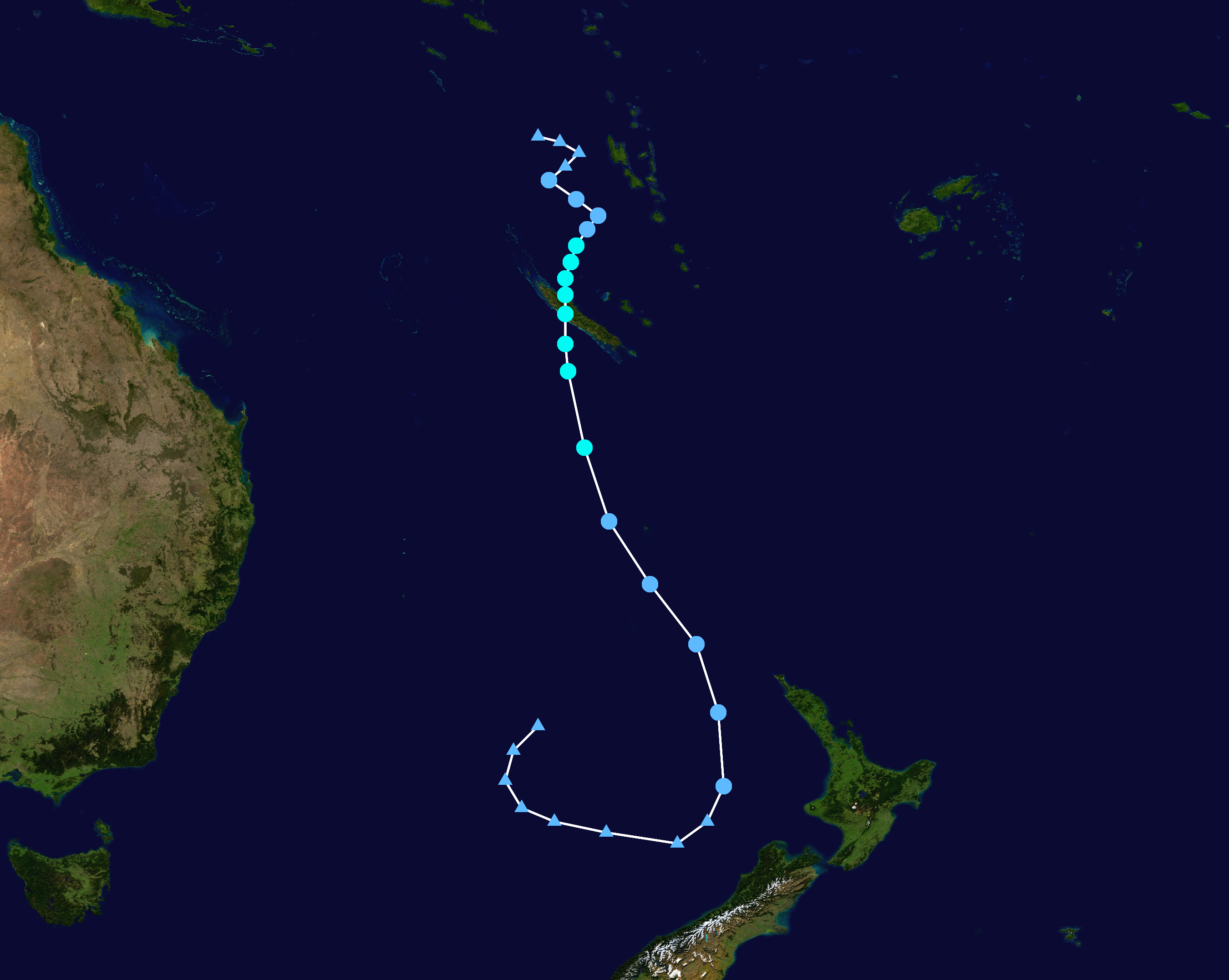
- Duration: December 30 – January 6
- Peak intensity: 85 km/h (50 mph) (10-min); 980 hPa (mbar)

Cyclone Rosie was a weak cyclone which existed in late December 1970 near New Caledonia.

=== Tropical Cyclone Ida ===
- Category 1 tropical cyclone (Australian scale)
- Tropical storm (SSHWS)
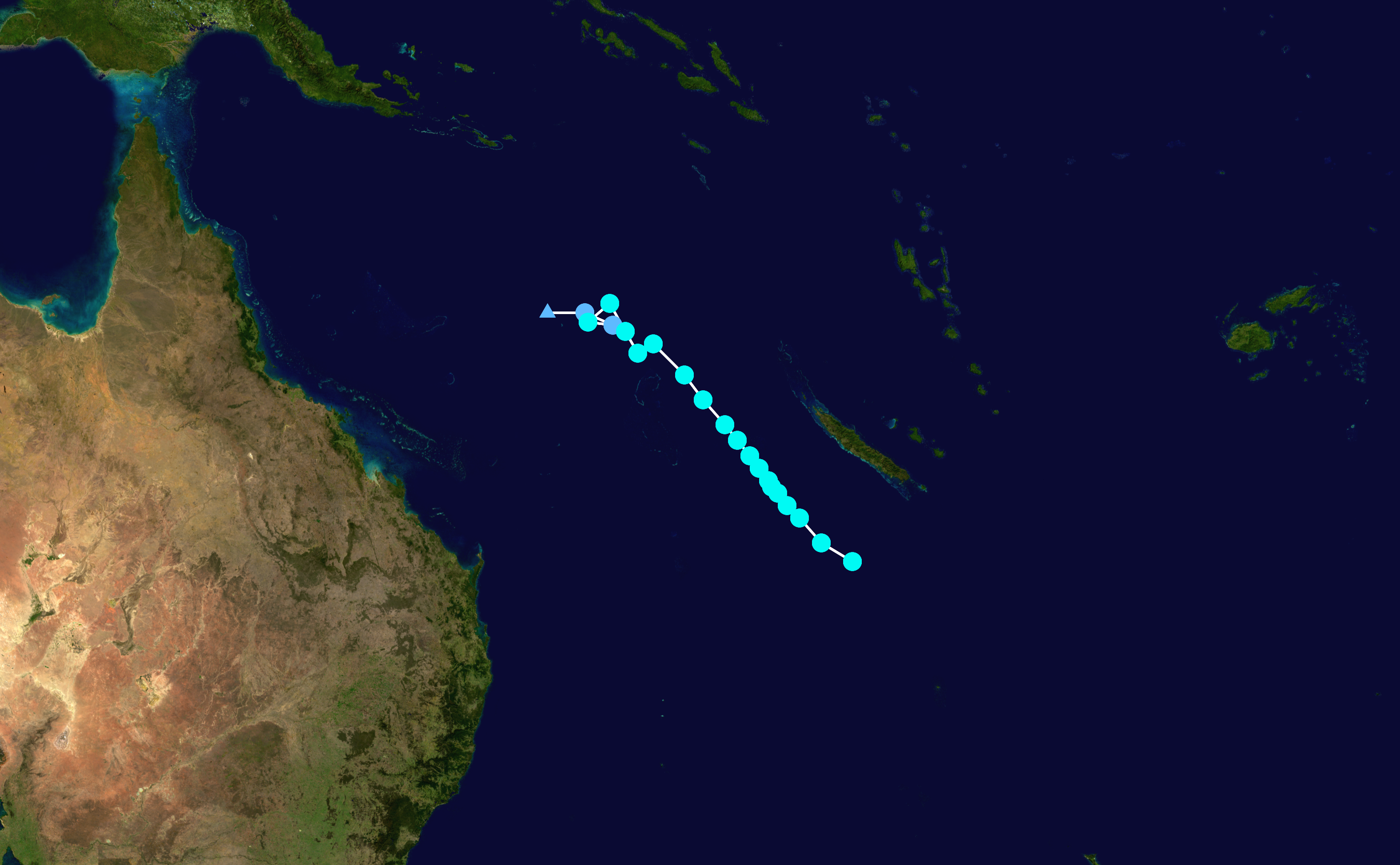
- Duration: February 15 – February 23
- Peak intensity: 85 km/h (55 mph) (10-min); 980 hPa (mbar)

Cyclone Ida existed from 16 to 22 February 1971 in the Coral Sea.

=== Tropical Cyclone Fiona ===
- Category 1 tropical cyclone (Australian scale)
- Tropical storm (SSHWS)
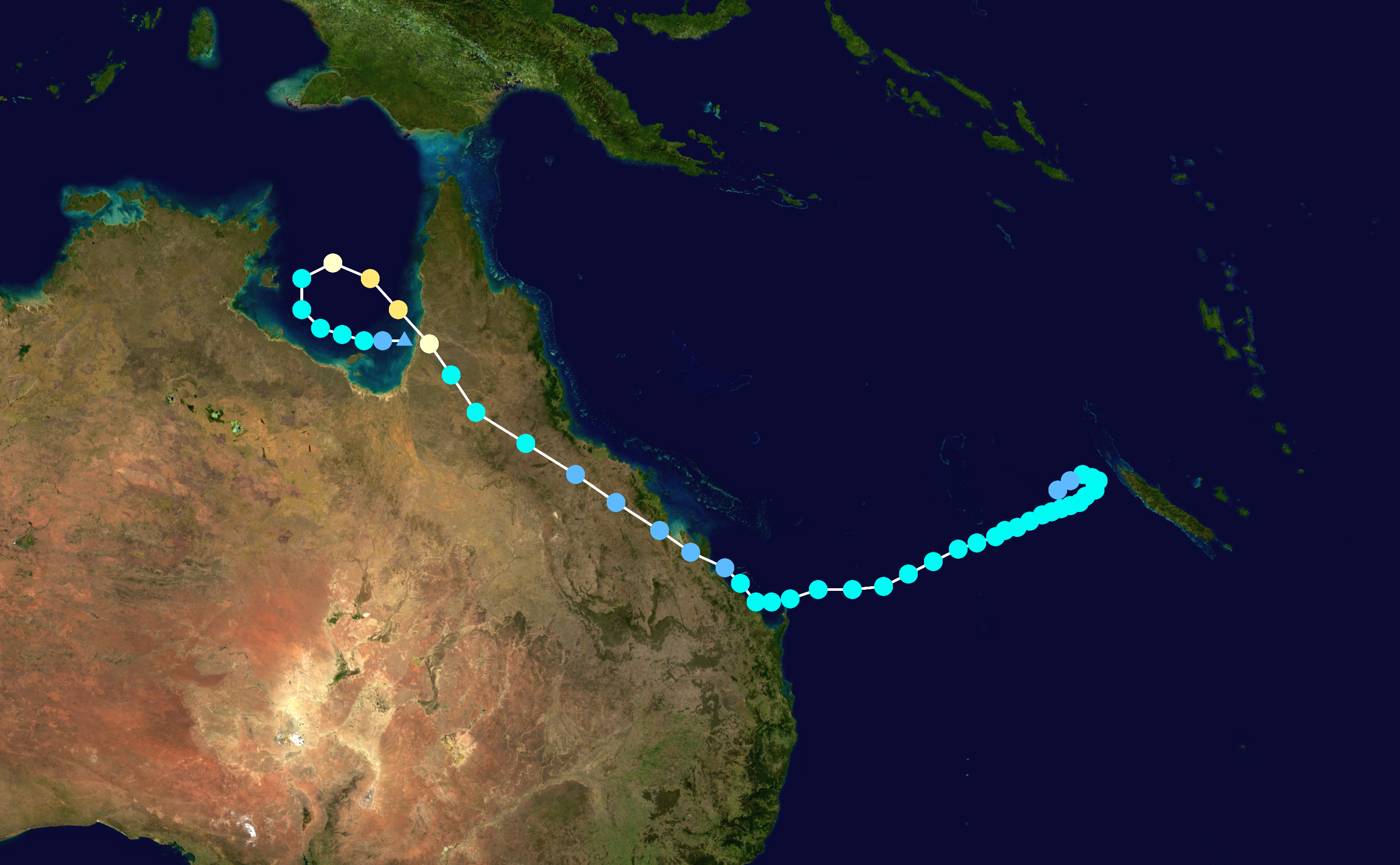
- Duration: February 24 – March 1
- Peak intensity: 70 km/h (45 mph) (10-min); 991 hPa (mbar)

Cyclone Fiona existed from 16 to 28 February 1971. It developed from remains of Cyclone Gertie, which was located in the Gulf of Carpentaria.

=== Tropical Cyclone Lena ===
- Category 2 tropical cyclone (Australian scale)
- Tropical storm (SSHWS)
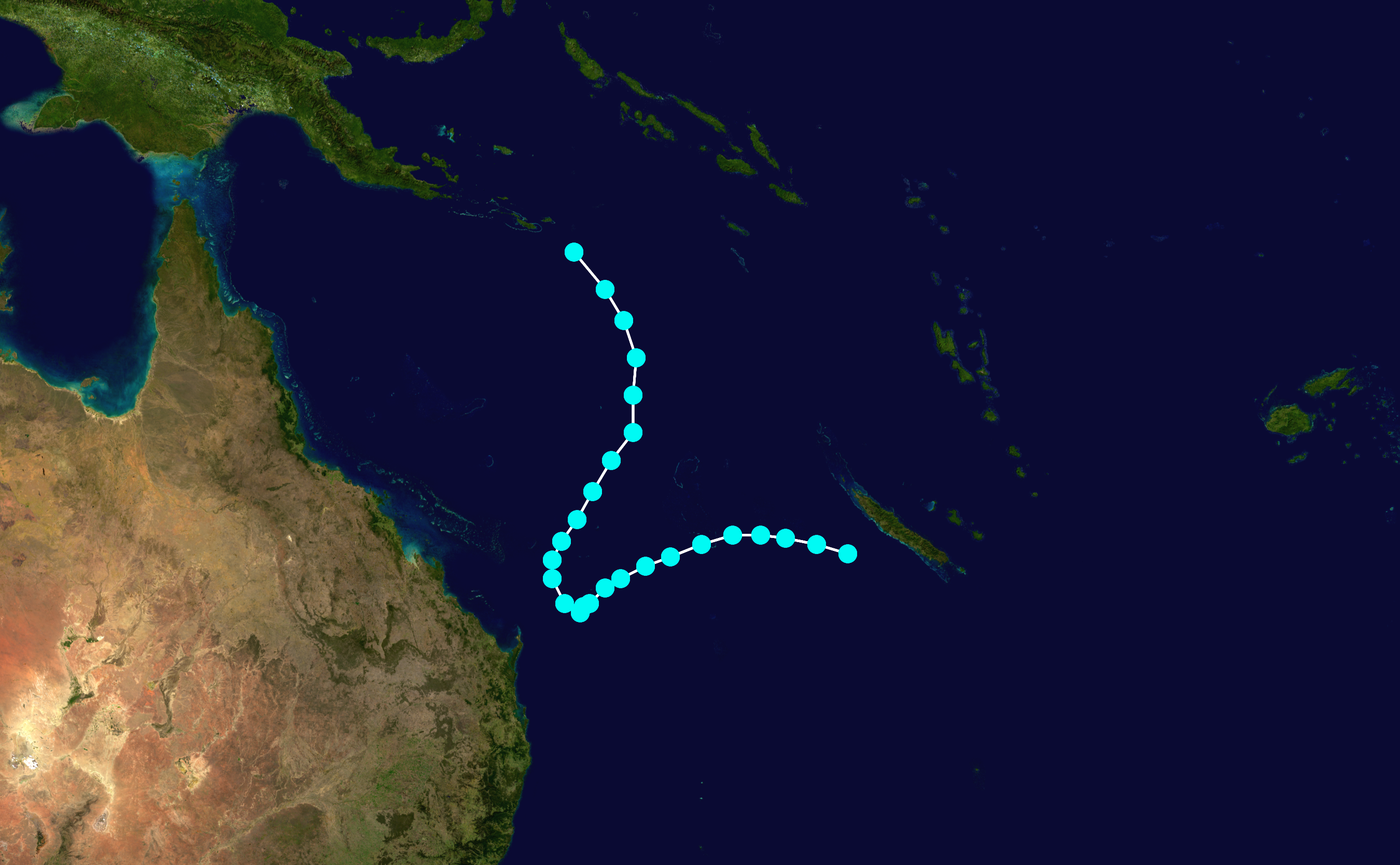
- Duration: March 13 – March 23
- Peak intensity: 95 km/h (60 mph) (10-min); 980 hPa (mbar)

Cyclone Lena existed from 13 to 20 March 1971 near New Caledonia.

=== Other systems ===
Tropical Depression Nora caused minor damage and gale-force winds over the Yasawa and Mamanuca islands, Viti-Levu as well as the Lomaiviti Islands, when it impacted Fiji between October 29–30.

Cyclone Dora formed in the Coral Sea east of Proserpine on February 10, 1971. It took a southeasterly track over the next four days, away from the Queensland coast, turning into a low pressure system well east of the Queensland/New South Wales border. On February 17, the system reintensified into a cyclone east of the Gold Coast, and it crossed the Queensland coast north of Brisbane at Redcliffe. Widespread structural damage was reported, with numerous power lines falling and roofs being uproofed.

During March 8, Tropical Cyclone Thelma impacted Western and Southwestern Fiji and caused flooding in Ba.

== Seasonal effects ==
1970–71 South Pacific cyclone season
| Name | Dates active | Peak intensity | | | Areas affected | Damage (US$) | Deaths | Refs |
| Name | Dates active | Category | Wind speed | Pressure | Areas affected | Damage (US$) | Deaths | Refs |
|---|---|---|---|---|---|---|---|---|
| Nora | October 29 – 30 | Tropical depression | Not Specified | Not Specified | Fiji | Minor | Unknown | |
| Priscilla | December 15 – 19 | Category 1 tropical cyclone | 75 km/h (45 mph) | 990 hPa (29.23 inHg) | Fiji | Minor | Unknown | |
| Rosie | December 30, 1970 – January 4, 1971 | Category 2 tropical cyclone | 100 km/h (65 mph) | 980 hPa (28.94 inHg) | Vanuatu, New Caledonia, New Zealand | Minor | Unknown | |
Season aggregates
| 3 systems | October 29, 1970 – January 4, 1971 | | 100 km/h (65 mph) | 980 hPa (28.94 inHg) | | | | |

== See also ==
- Atlantic hurricane seasons: 1970, 1971
- Eastern Pacific hurricane seasons: 1970, 1971
- Western Pacific typhoon seasons: 1970, 1971
- North Indian Ocean cyclone seasons: 1970, 1971
