= Muriel (surname) =

Muriel is a surname. Notable people with the surname include:

- Adriana Muriel (fl. 1990), Colombian former racing cyclist
- Alma Muriel (1951–2014), Mexican actress
- John Muriel (1909–1975), British countryman, teacher, novelist, and biographer
- Josefina Muriel (1918–2008), Mexican writer, historian, researcher, bibliophile, and academic
- Luis Muriel (born 1991), Colombian footballer
