= Mariel =

Mariel may refer to:

- Mariel (given name)
- Mariel, Cuba, a municipality and city
- Mariel boatlift, a 1980 exodus of Cubans to the United States
- Mariel of Redwall, a book in the Redwall series by Brian Jacques
- Mari-El, an autonomous republic of Russia
- El Mariel, second studio album by Cuban-American rapper Pitbull

== See also ==
- Marial (disambiguation)
