= Muriel, Guadalajara =

Muriel
- Village
- Location within Province of Guadalajara Location within Spain
- Coordinates: 40°59′1″N 3°11′41″W
- Country: Spain
- Autonomous community: Castilla–La Mancha
- Province: Province of Guadalajara
- Municipality: Tamajón
- Elevation: 866 m (2,841 ft)

Population
  - Total: 11

Muriel is a hamlet located in the municipality of Tamajón, in Guadalajara province, Castilla–La Mancha, Spain. As of 2020, it has a population of 11.

== Geography ==
Muriel is located 54 km north of Guadalajara, Spain.
