= Morial =

Morial is a surname. Notable people with the surname include:

- Ernest Nathan Morial (1929–1989), American politician and civic leader
  - New Orleans Morial Convention Center
- Marc Morial (born 1958), American politician and civic leader, son of Ernest
- Sybil Haydel Morial (1932–2024), American civil rights activist and educator
