= Marial =

Marial may refer to:

- Marial, Oregon, an unincorporated community in Curry County, Oregon, United States
- Marial Shayok (born 1995), South Sudanese-Canadian basketball player in the Israeli Premier Basketball League
- Marial (surname)

== See also ==
- Mariel (disambiguation)
