= 1970–71 South-West Indian Ocean cyclone season =

Cyclone season in the Southwest Indian Ocean

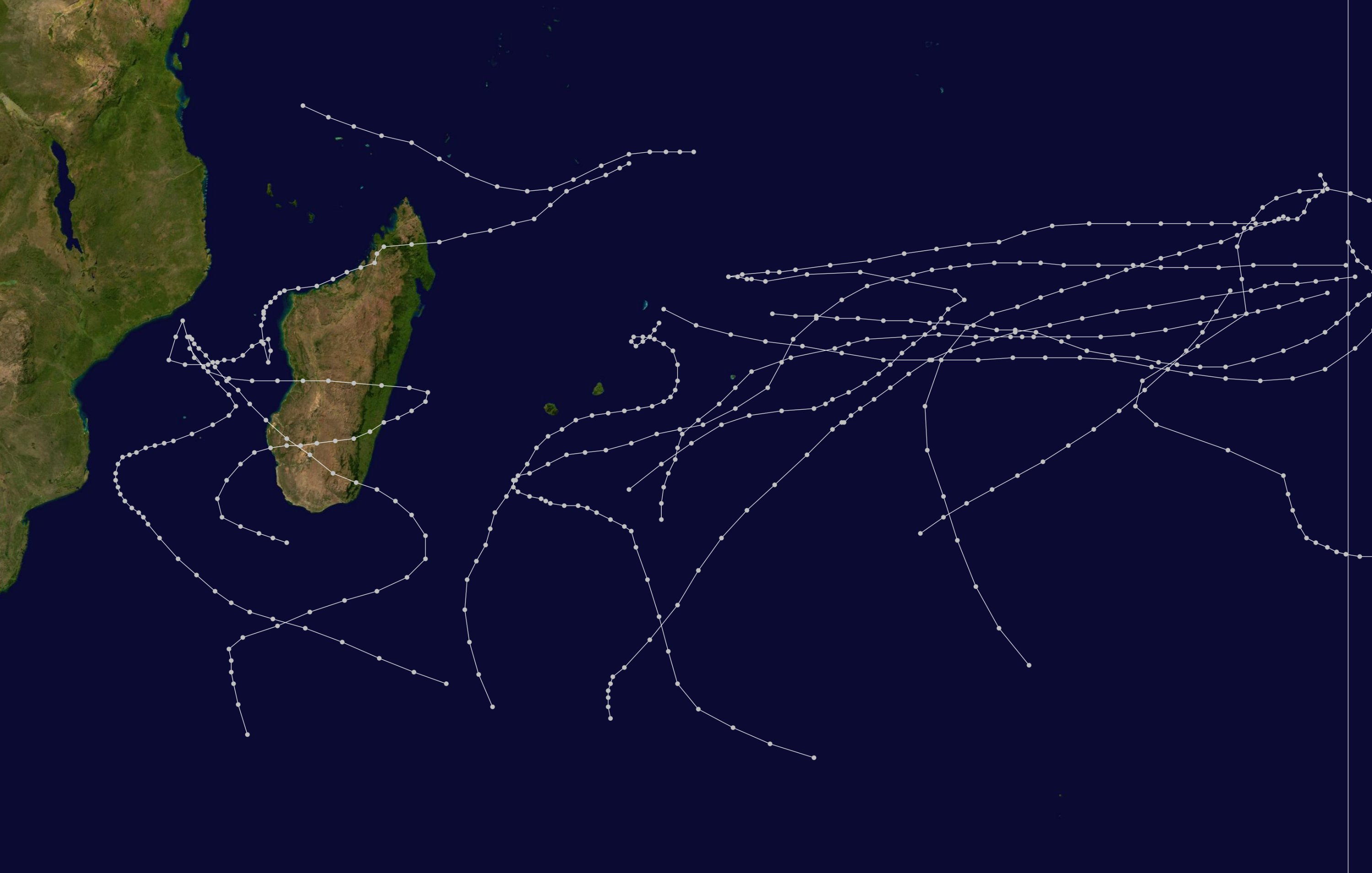
- Season summary map

Seasonal boundaries
- First system formed: 16 September 1970
- Last system dissipated: 21 March 1971

Strongest storm
- Name: Maggie-Muriel
  - Maximum winds: 195 km/h (120 mph) (10-minute sustained)
  - Lowest pressure: 951 hPa (mbar)

Seasonal statistics
- Total disturbances: 16
- Total depressions: 15
- Total storms: 15
- Tropical cyclones: 10
- Intense tropical cyclones: 4
- Very intense tropical cyclones: 0
- Total fatalities: 32
- Total damage: Unknown

Related articles
- 1970–71 Australian region cyclone season; 1970–71 South Pacific cyclone season

The 1970–71 South-West Indian Ocean cyclone season was an above-average cyclone season. The season officially ran from November 1, 1970, to April 30, 1971.

== Systems ==
=== Tropical Disturbance Andree ===
- Tropical disturbance (MFR)
- Tropical depression (SSHWS)
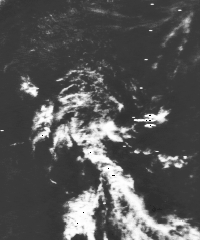
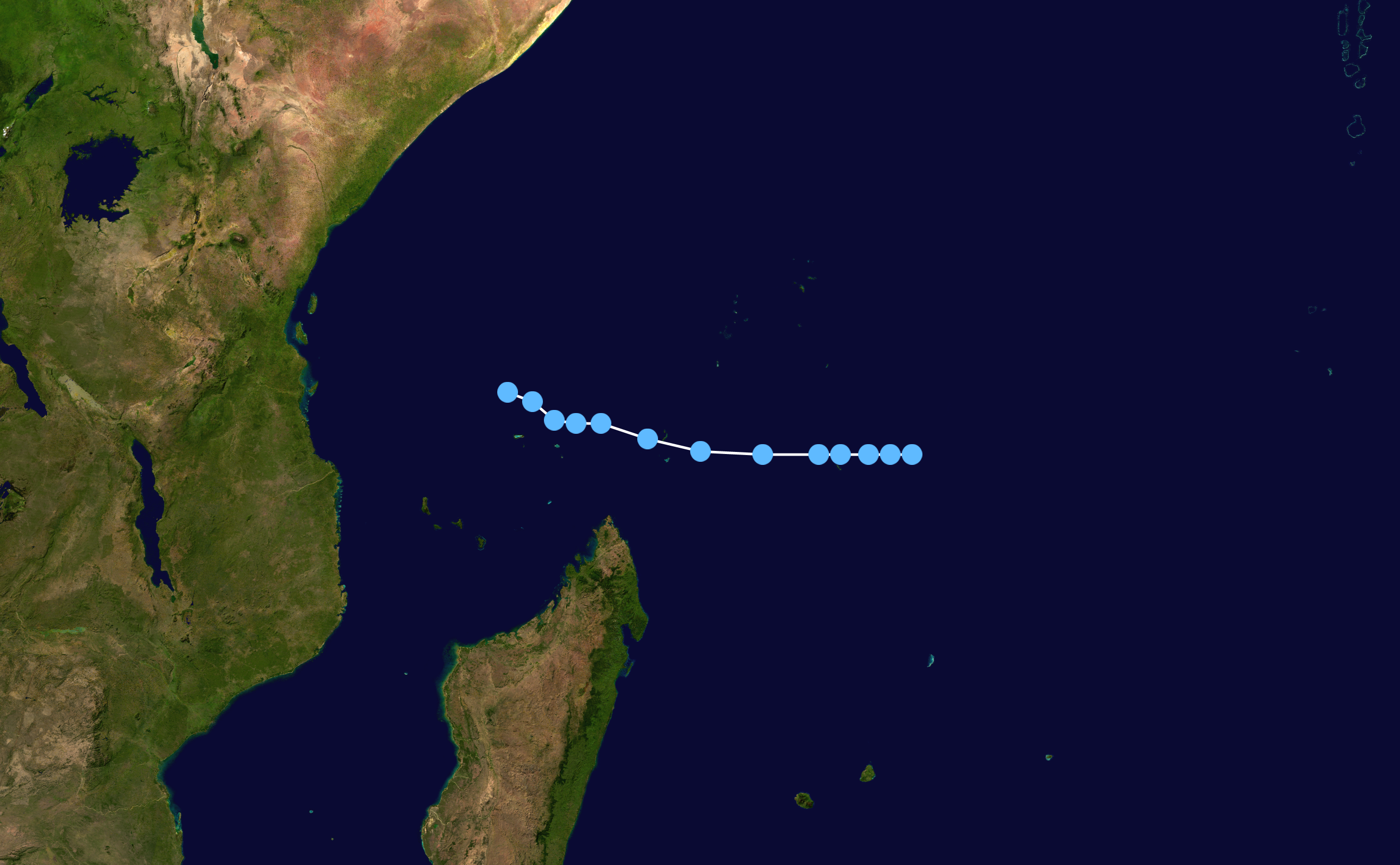
- Duration: September 16 – September 19
- Peak intensity: 45 km/h (30 mph) (10-min);

=== Moderate Tropical Storm Betsy ===
- Moderate tropical storm (MFR)
- Tropical storm (SSHWS)
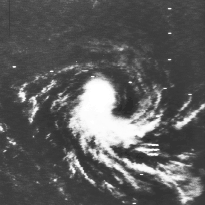
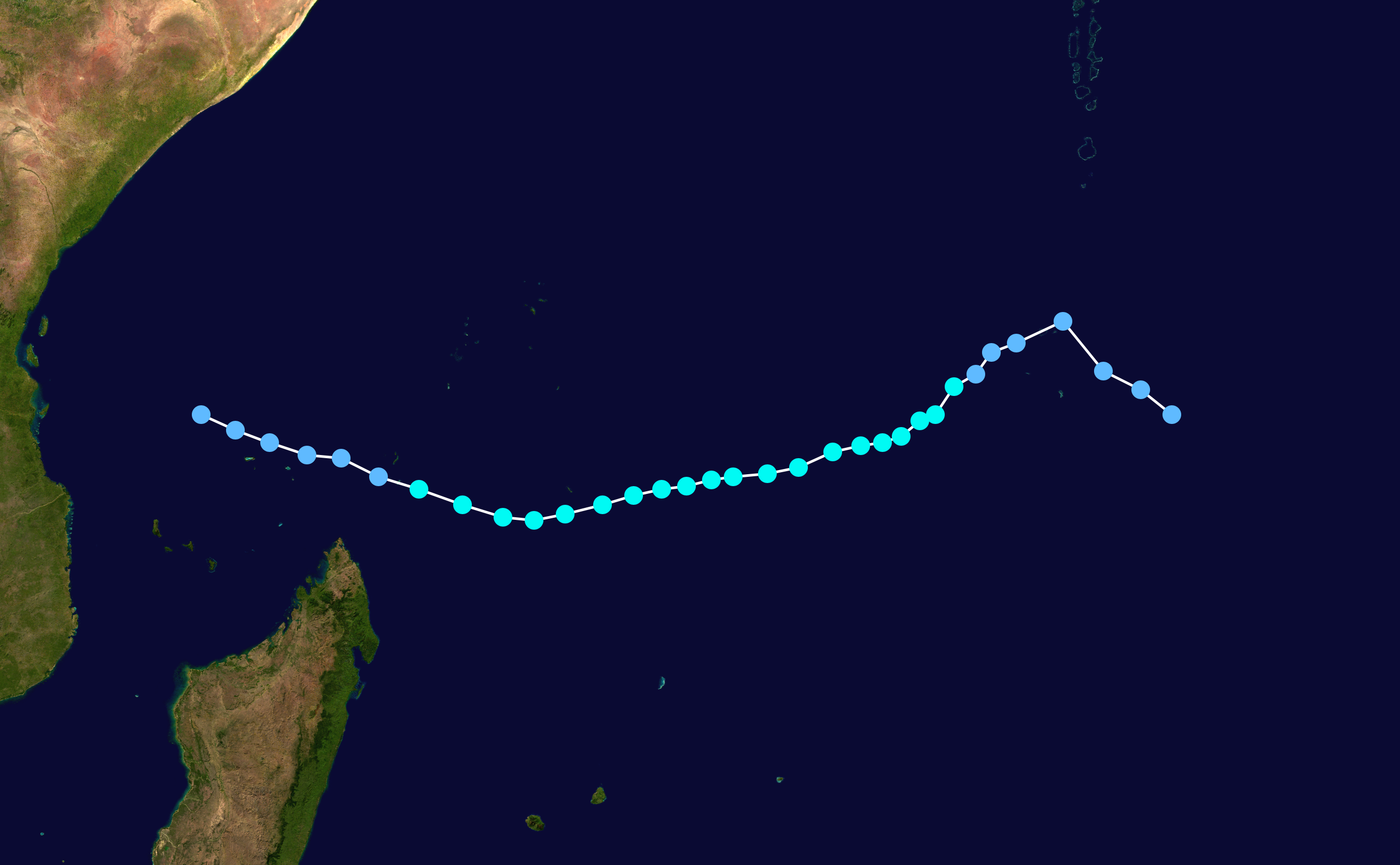
- Duration: October 1 – October 8
- Peak intensity: 65 km/h (40 mph) (10-min);

=== Moderate Tropical Storm Andrea–Claudine ===
- Moderate tropical storm (MFR)
- Tropical storm (SSHWS)
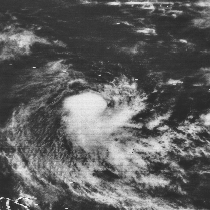
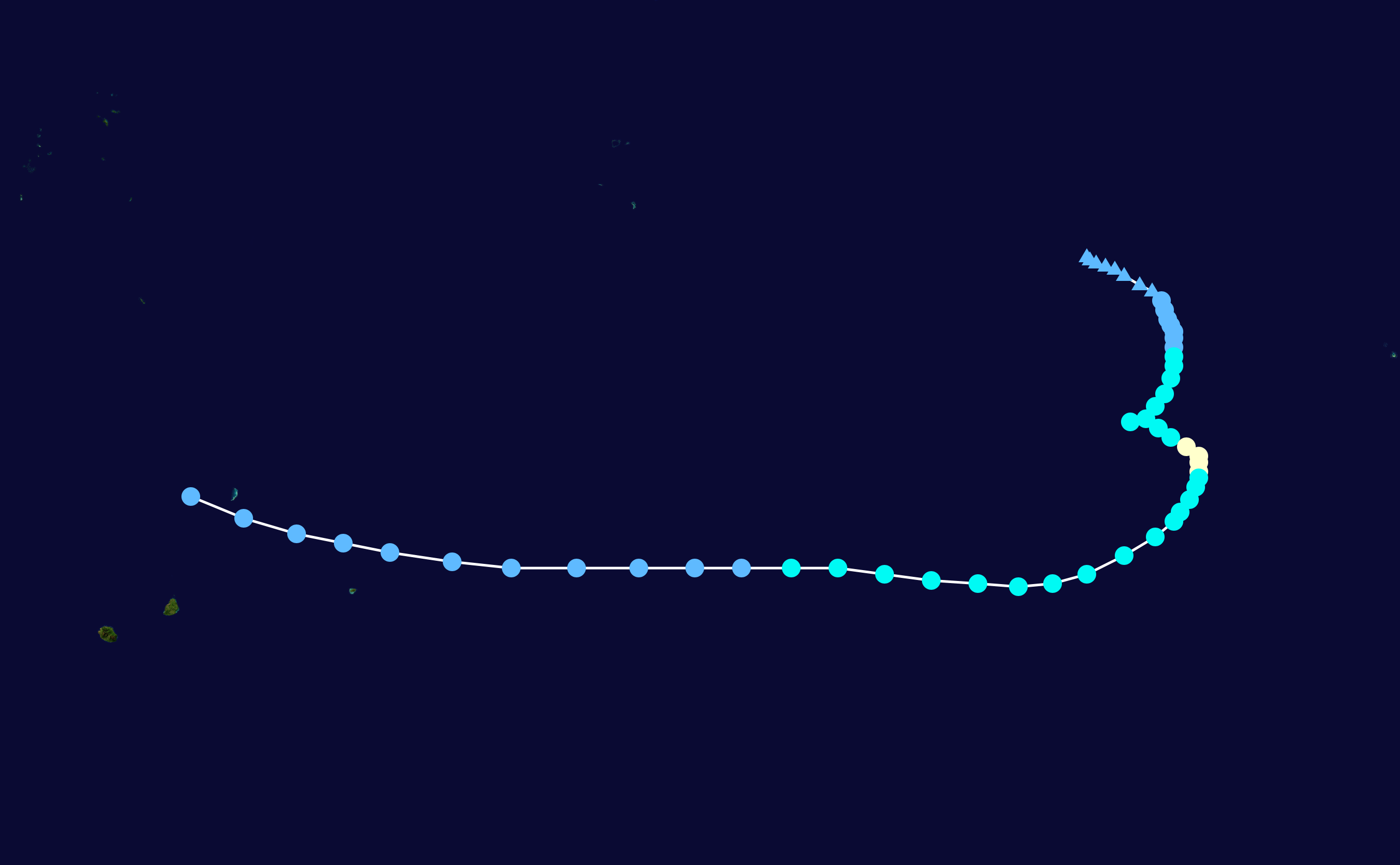
- Duration: November 10 (Crossed 80°E) – November 13
- Peak intensity: 65 km/h (40 mph) (10-min); 970 hPa (mbar)

- Andrea-Claudine, 10 November to 13 November 1970 in central Indian Ocean

=== Intense Tropical Cyclone Hilary–Dominique ===
- Intense tropical cyclone (MFR)
- Category 3 tropical cyclone (SSHWS)
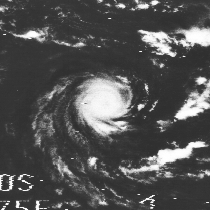
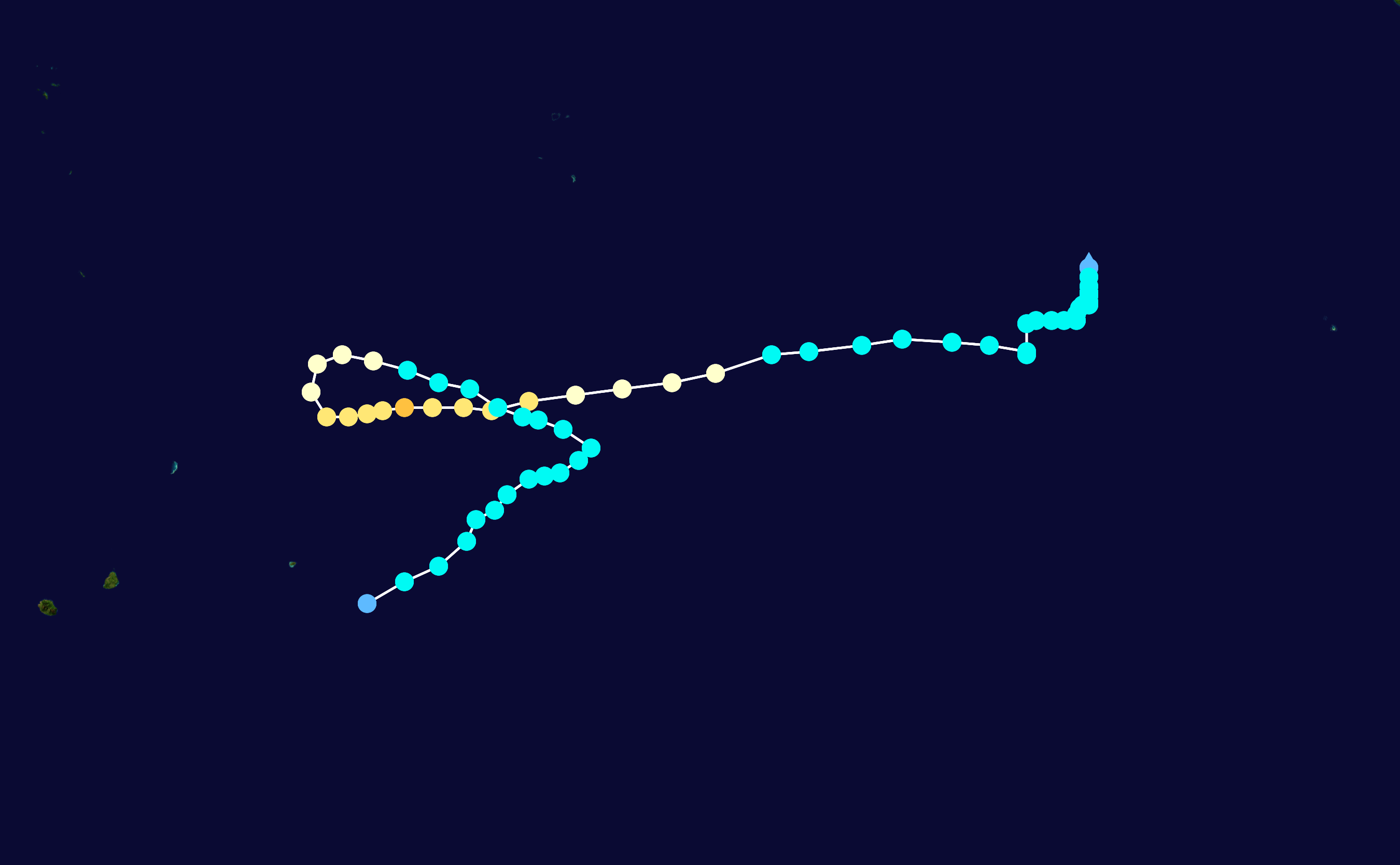
- Duration: December 12 – December 28
- Peak intensity: 165 km/h (105 mph) (10-min);

- Hilary, 11 to 18 December 1970 in central Indian Ocean

=== Moderate Tropical Storm Edith ===
- Moderate tropical storm (MFR)
- Tropical storm (SSHWS)
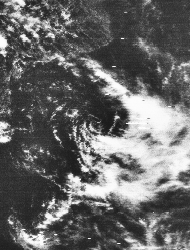
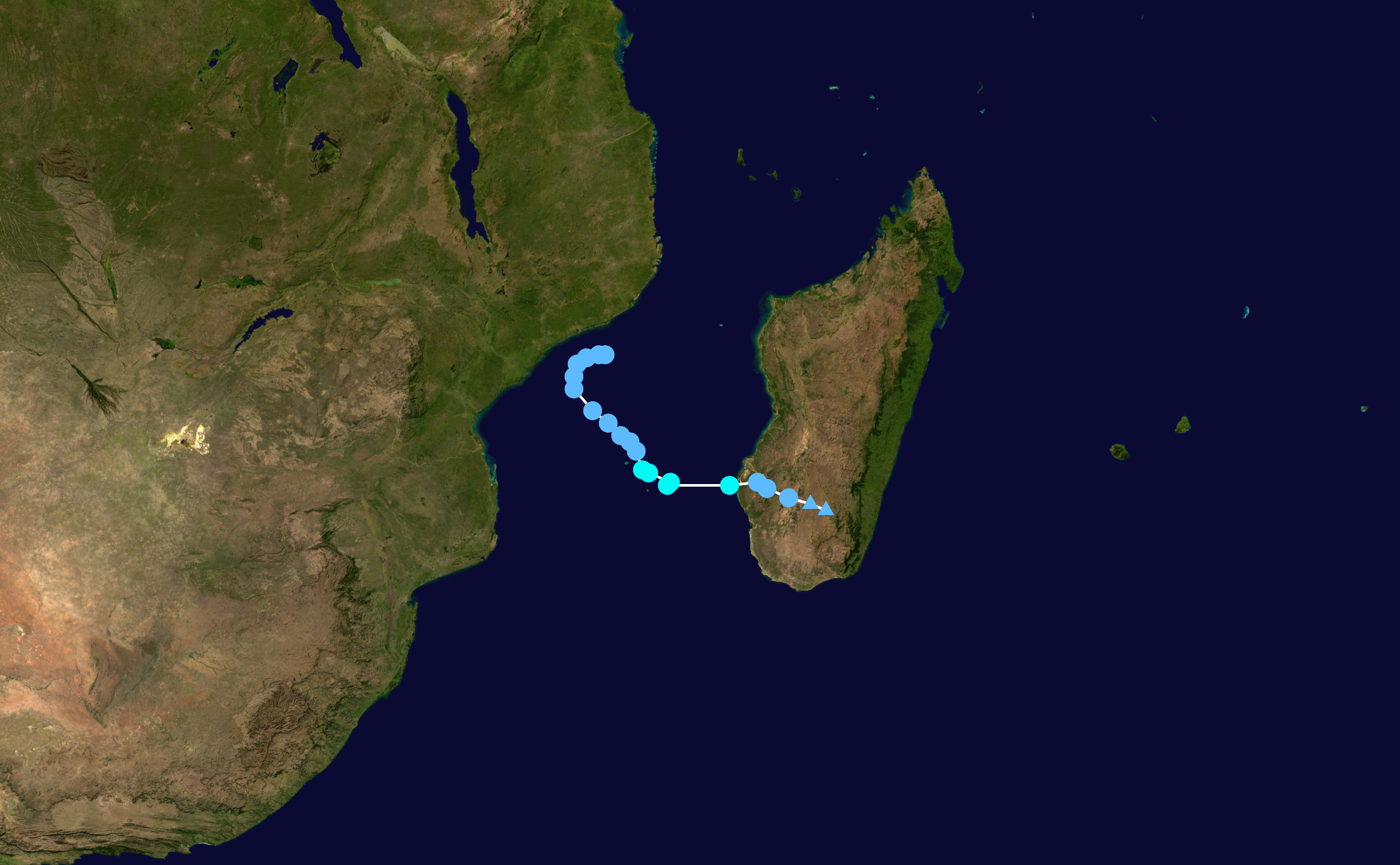
- Duration: January 5 – January 10
- Peak intensity: 65 km/h (40 mph) (10-min);

=== Tropical Cyclone Felicie ===
- Tropical cyclone (MFR)
- Category 1 tropical cyclone (SSHWS)
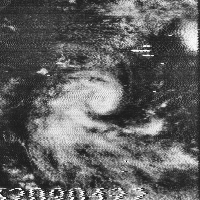
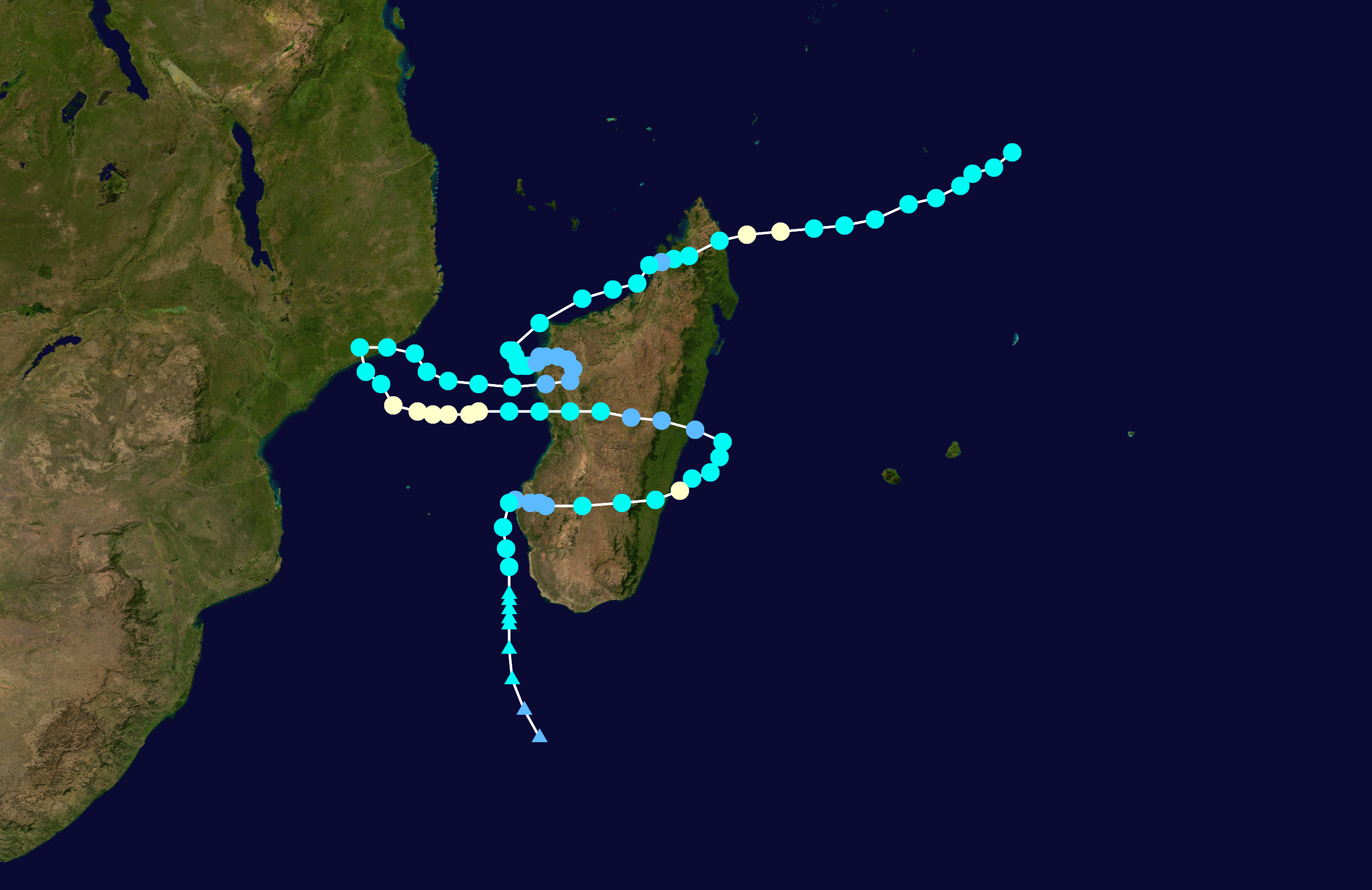
- Duration: January 17 – February 6
- Peak intensity: 120 km/h (75 mph) (10-min);

Cyclone Felicie was a slow moving cyclone that made a large number of landfalls in Madagascar, 4, in addition to a single landfall in Mozambique, which reportedly killed 30 people. The storm followed a very erratic track due to unusual steering patterns, and went through many cycles of strengthening and weakening as it slowly trudged to the south. Felicie reached Tropical Cyclone status three separate times, before finally becoming extratropical southwest of Madagascar.

=== Tropical Cyclone Myrtle–Ginette ===
- Tropical cyclone (MFR)
- Category 2 tropical cyclone (SSHWS)
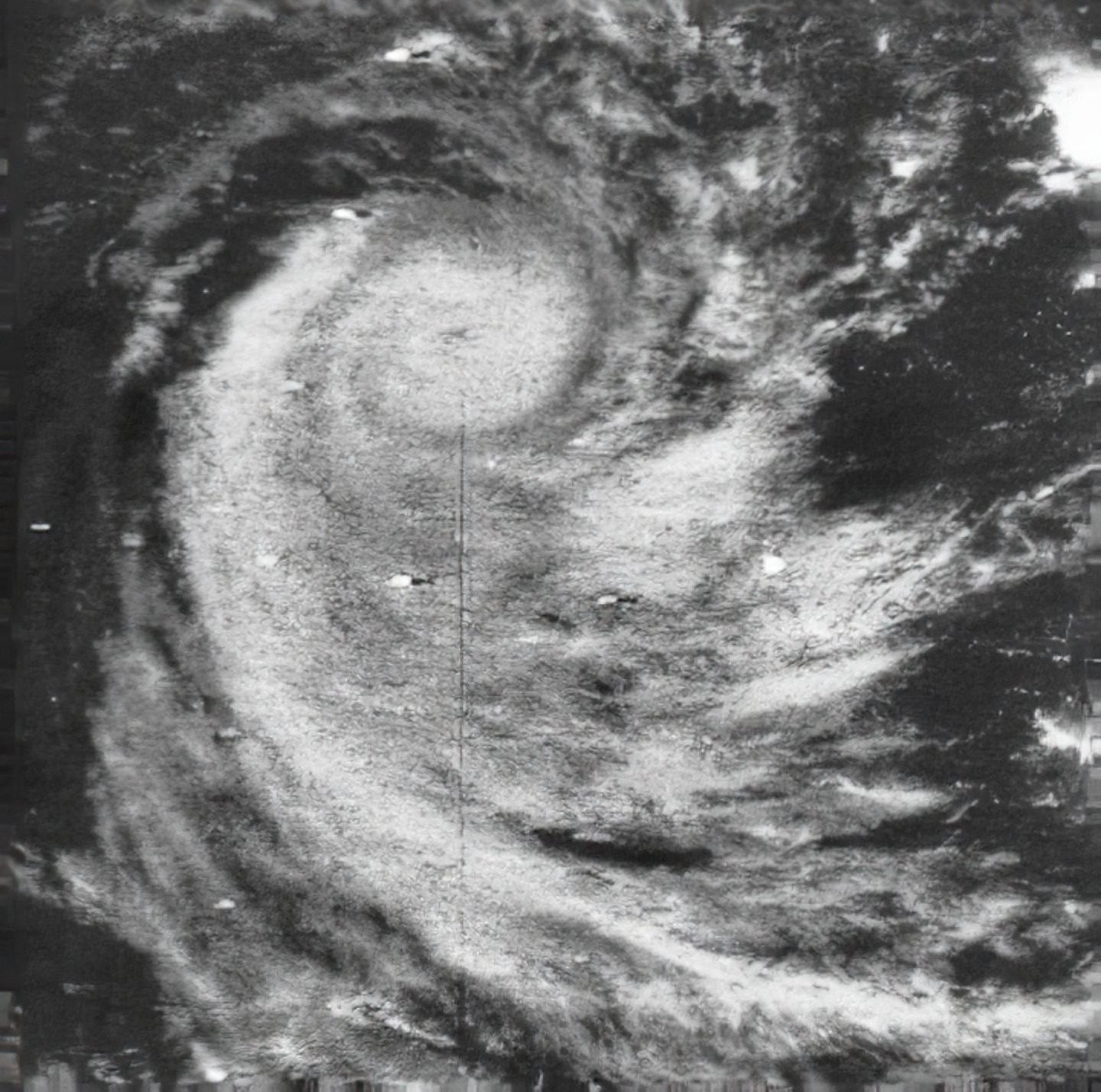
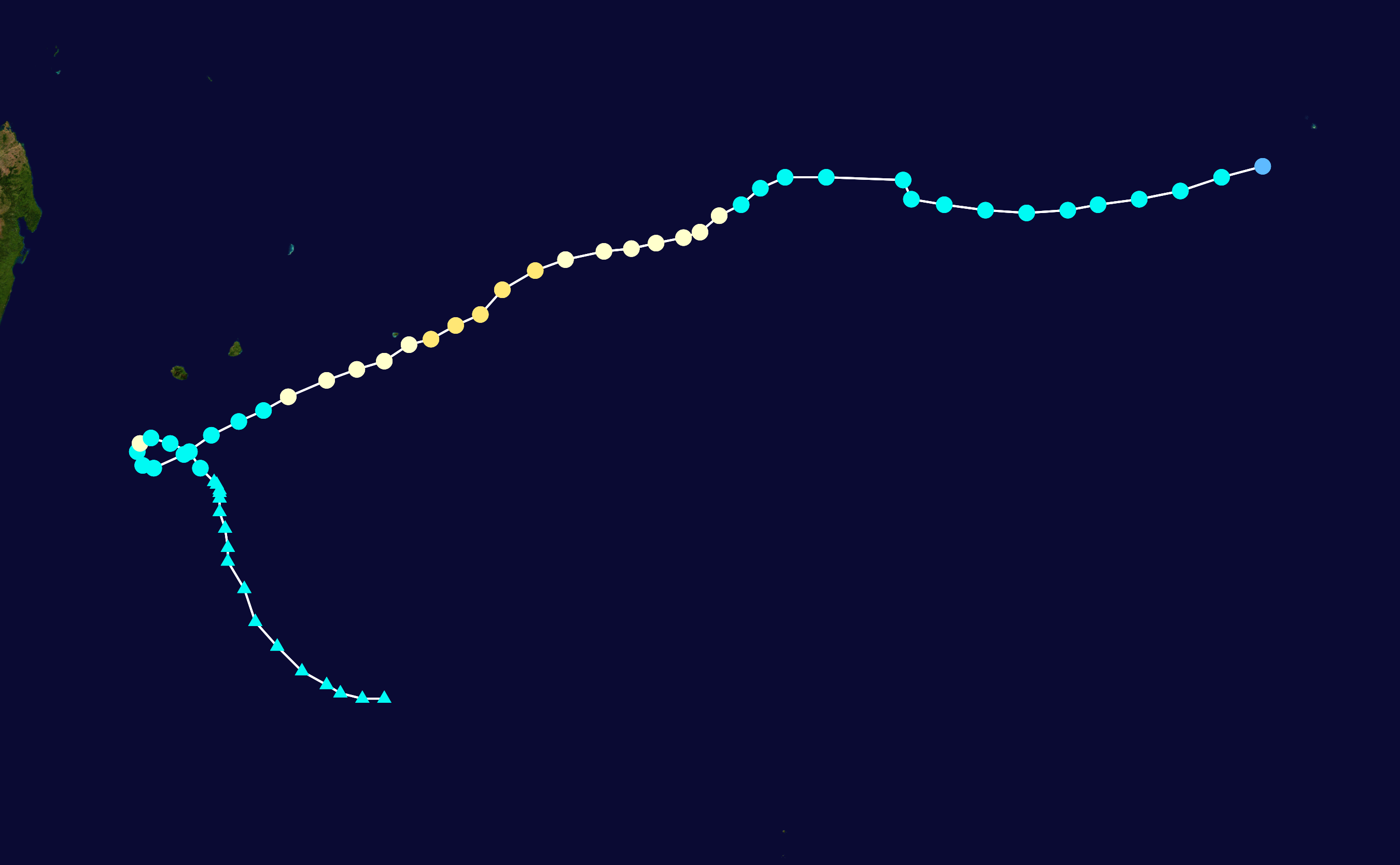
- Duration: January 15 – January 31
- Peak intensity: 150 km/h (90 mph) (10-min);

On January 19, Severe Tropical Cyclone Myrtle entered the South-West Indian Ocean; therefore, it was assigned a second name, Ginette. The next day, Ginette reached hurricane status and developed a clear eye as it traveled generally west-southwestward. On January 22, Ginette curved southwestward and came within 72 kilometers (45 miles) of the island of Rodrigues. On Rodrigues, winds as high as 150 km/h (93 mph) were recorded along with a minimum barometric pressure of 989 mbar (29.2 inHg). Throughout the next two days, Ginette approached the island of Reunion, causing stormy weather that lasted until January 29. In Reunion, swells associated with Ginette reached 6 meters (20 feet) at times. On January 25, Ginette became stationary while located south of Reunion. The next day, Ginette encountered a ridge which caused it to execute a small clockwise loop. After completing the loop, Ginette accelerated southeastward and gradually weakened. By January 31, Ginette had transitioned into an extratropical cyclone.

=== Tropical Cyclone Helga ===
- Tropical cyclone (MFR)
- Category 2 tropical cyclone (SSHWS)
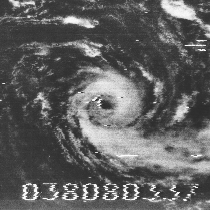
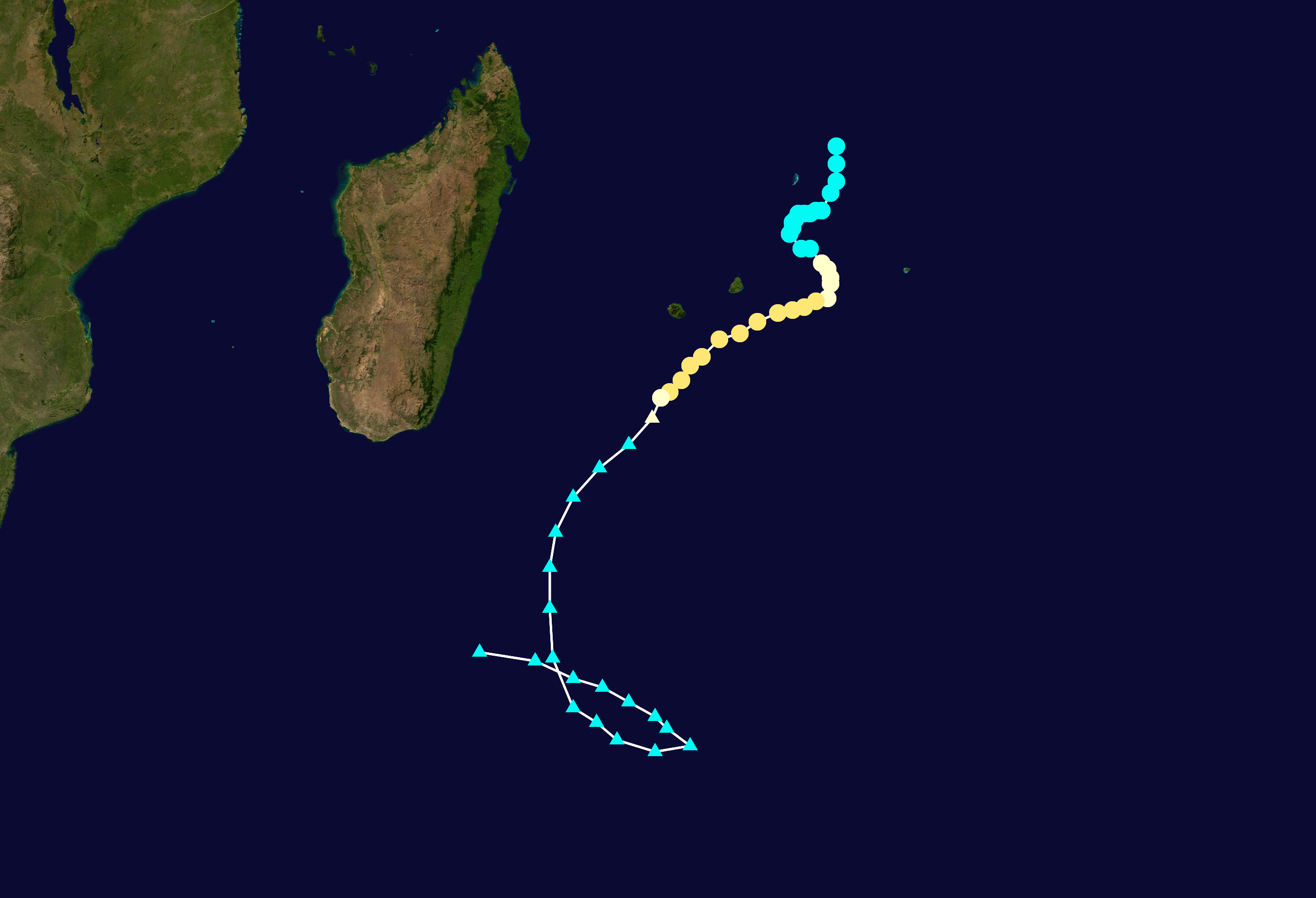
- Duration: February 2 – February 15
- Peak intensity: 150 km/h (90 mph) (10-min);

On February 8, Helga passed southeast of Réunion and Mauritius, bringing heavy rainfall to the former island, reaching 926 mm (36.5 in) at Commerson. Two people died on the island due to drowning.

=== Tropical Cyclone Tilly-Iphigenie ===
- Tropical cyclone (MFR)
- Category 1 tropical cyclone (SSHWS)
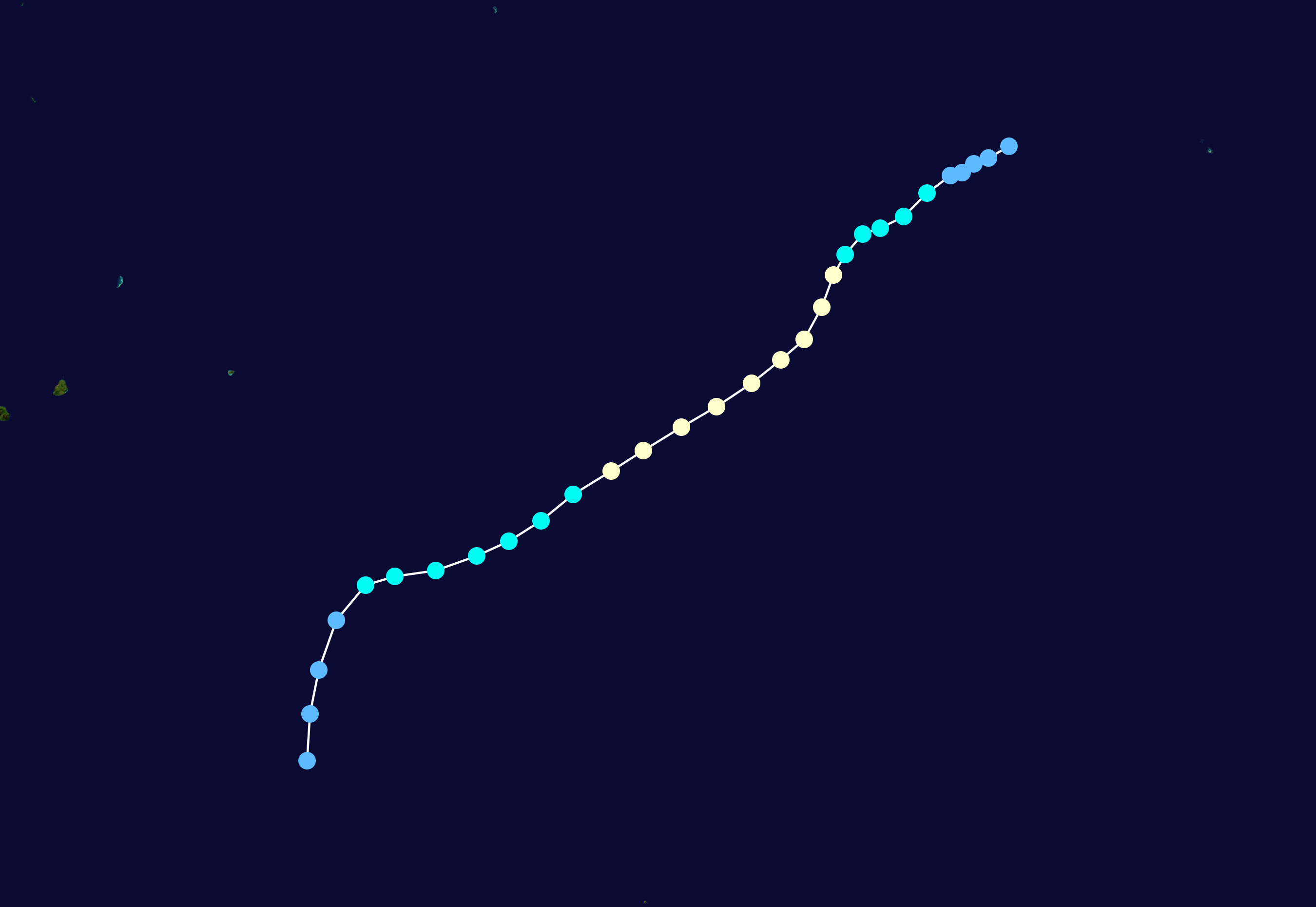
- Duration: February 14 (entered basin) – February 17
- Peak intensity: 120 km/h (75 mph) (10-min); 970 hPa (mbar)

=== Tropical Cyclone Joelle ===
- Tropical cyclone (MFR)
- Category 1 tropical cyclone (SSHWS)
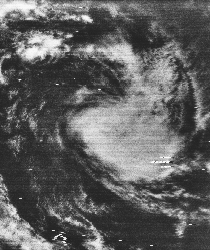
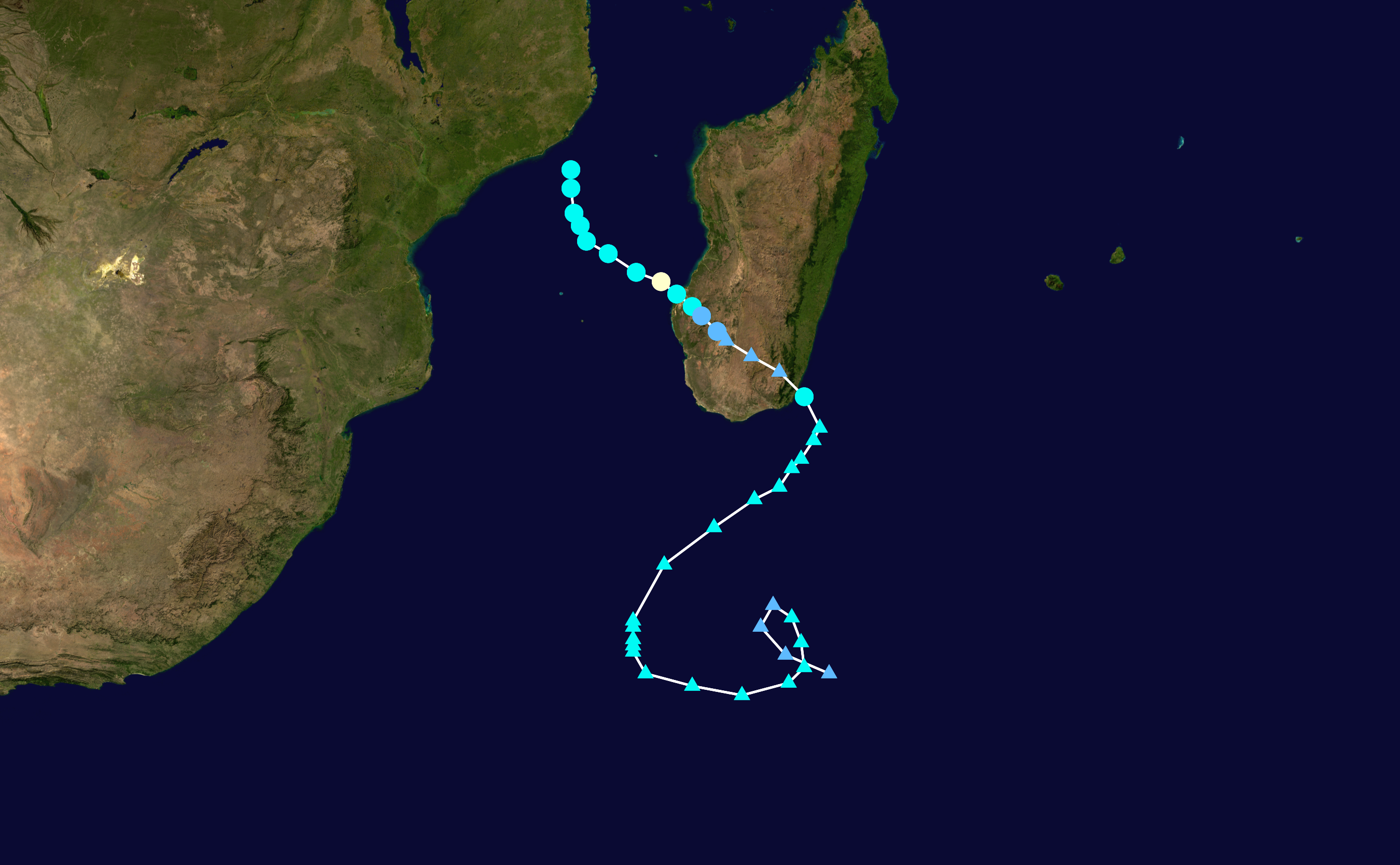
- Duration: February 15 – February 25
- Peak intensity: 120 km/h (75 mph) (10-min);

=== Tropical Cyclone Kalinka ===
- Tropical cyclone (MFR)
- Category 2 tropical cyclone (SSHWS)
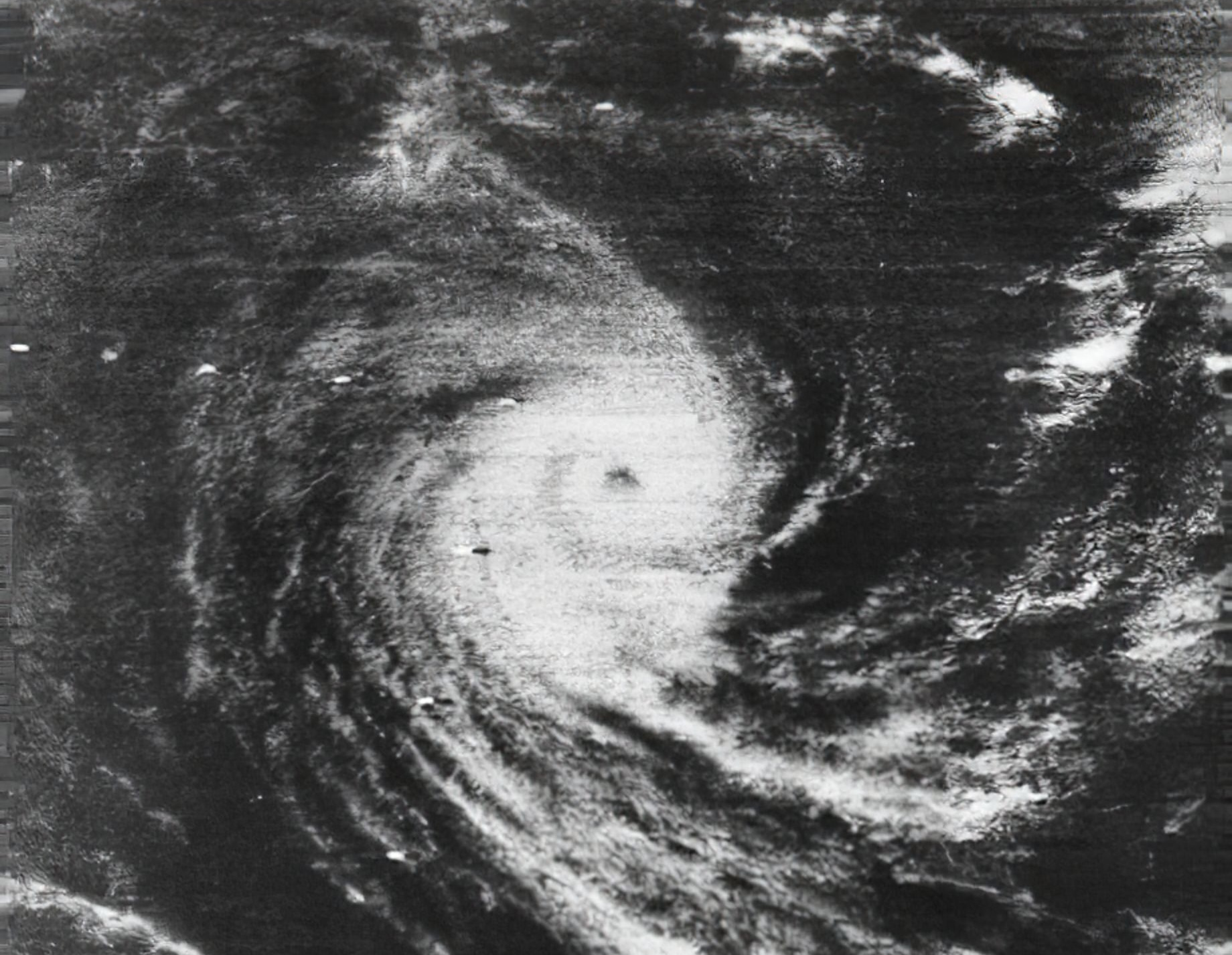
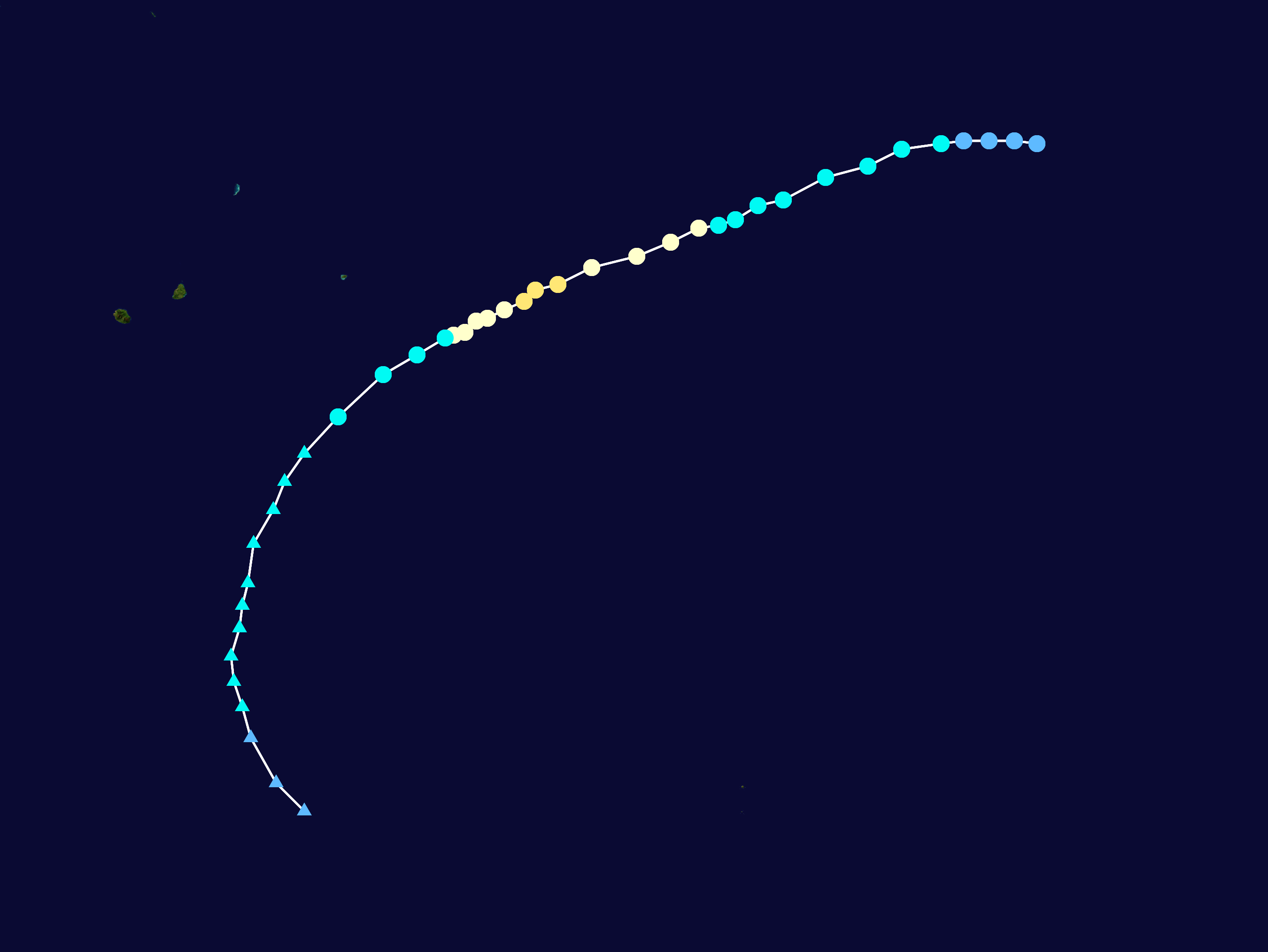
- Duration: February 16 – February 26
- Peak intensity: 140 km/h (85 mph) (10-min);

=== Tropical Cyclone Yvonne–Lise ===
- Tropical cyclone (MFR)
- Category 1 tropical cyclone (SSHWS)
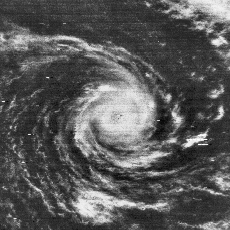
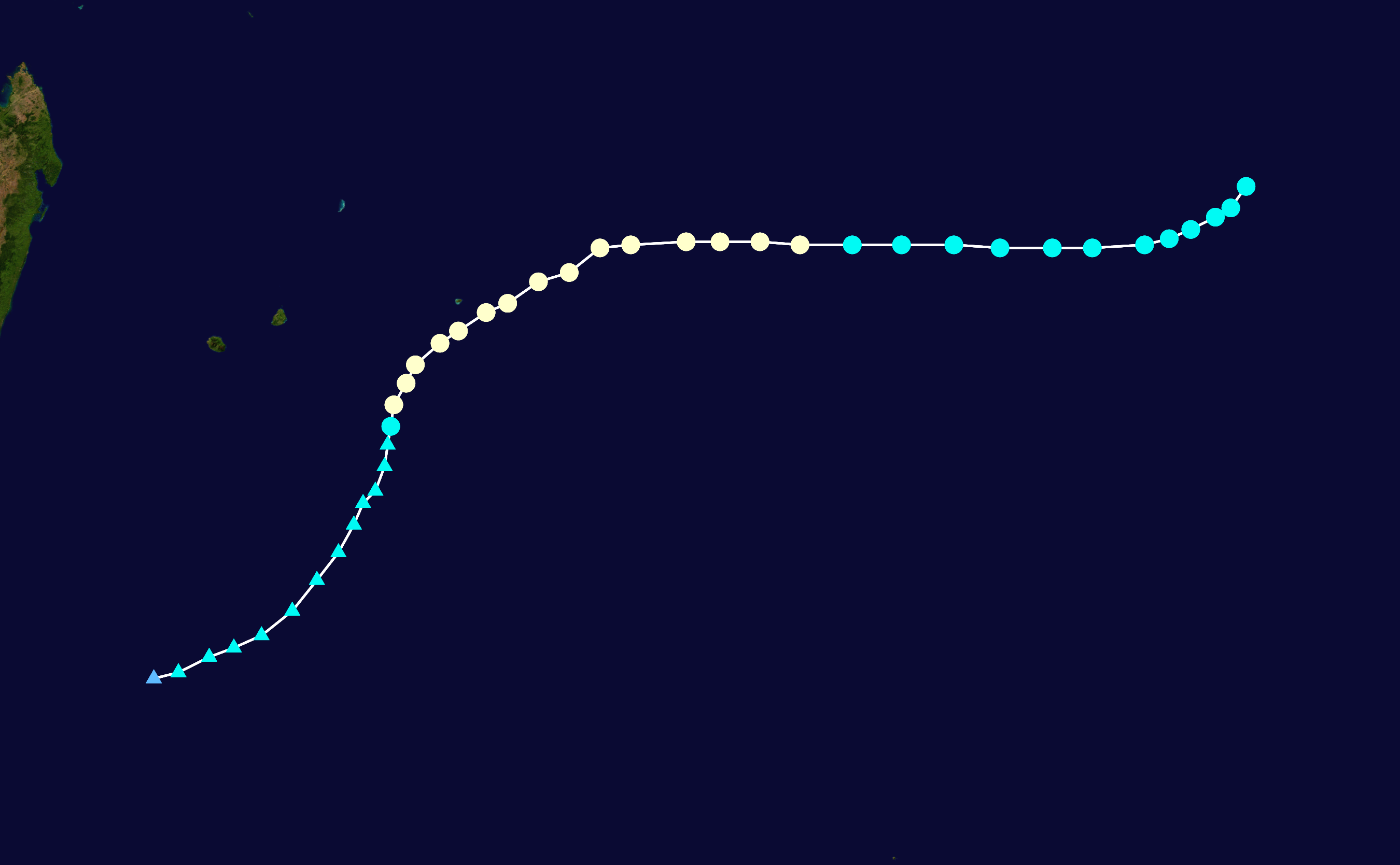
- Duration: February 21 – March 3
- Peak intensity: 130 km/h (80 mph) (10-min);

=== Intense Tropical Cyclone Maggie–Muriel ===
- Intense tropical cyclone (MFR)
- Category 3 tropical cyclone (SSHWS)
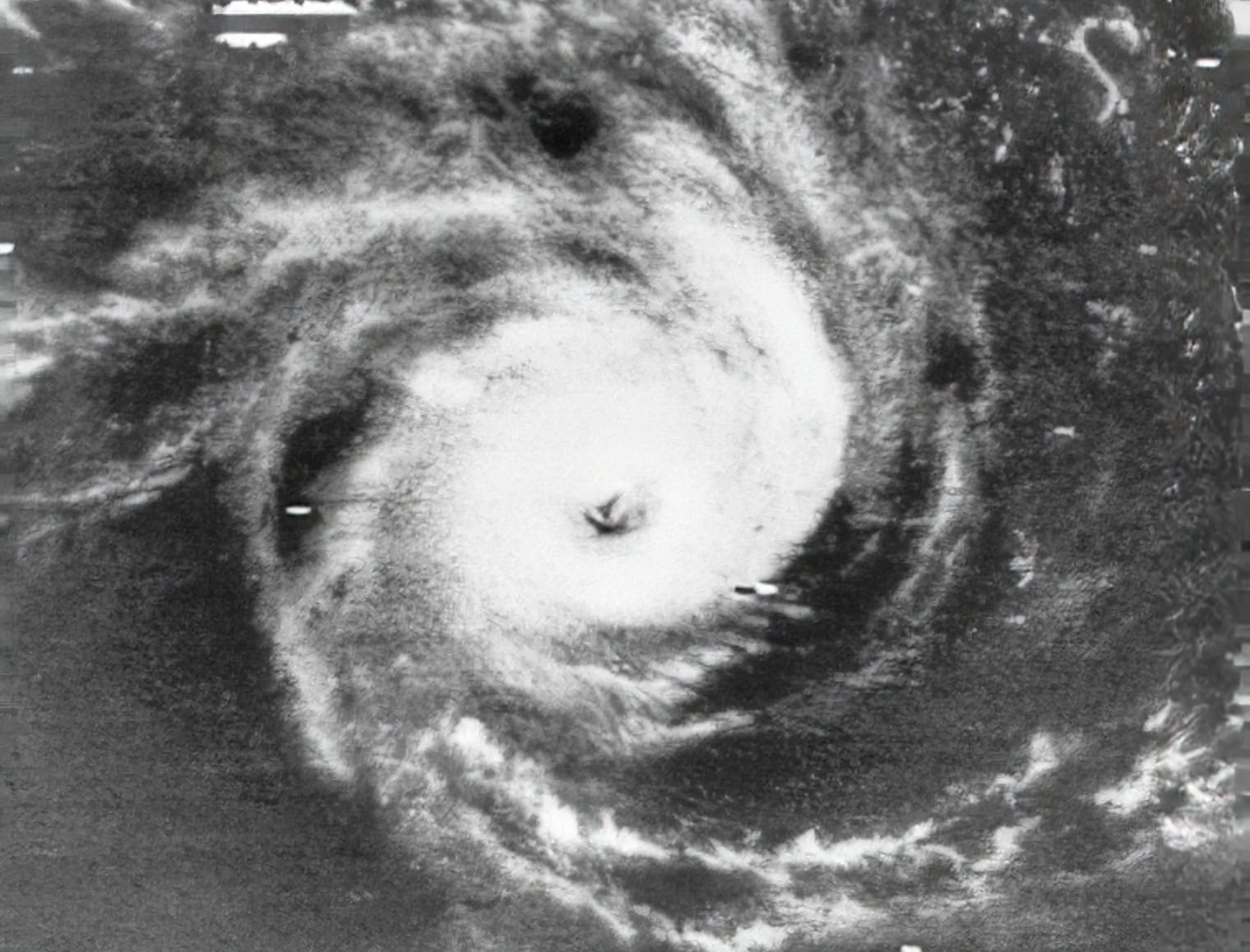
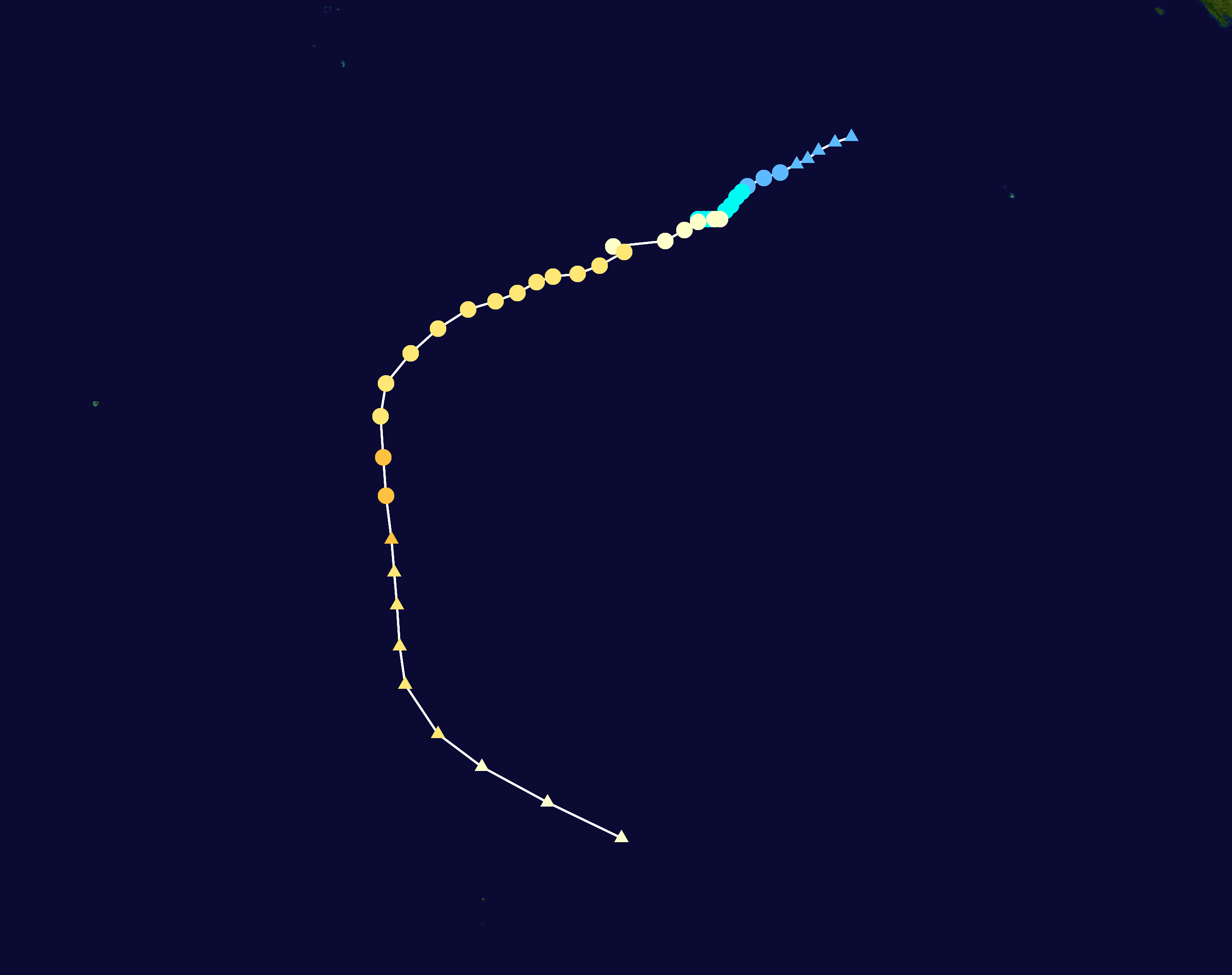
- Duration: March 7 – March 18
- Peak intensity: 165 km/h (105 mph) (10-min); 951 hPa (mbar)

- Maggie/Muriel, 7 to 20 March 1971 in central Indian Ocean

=== Tropical Cyclone Nelly ===
- Tropical cyclone (MFR)
- Category 1 tropical cyclone (SSHWS)
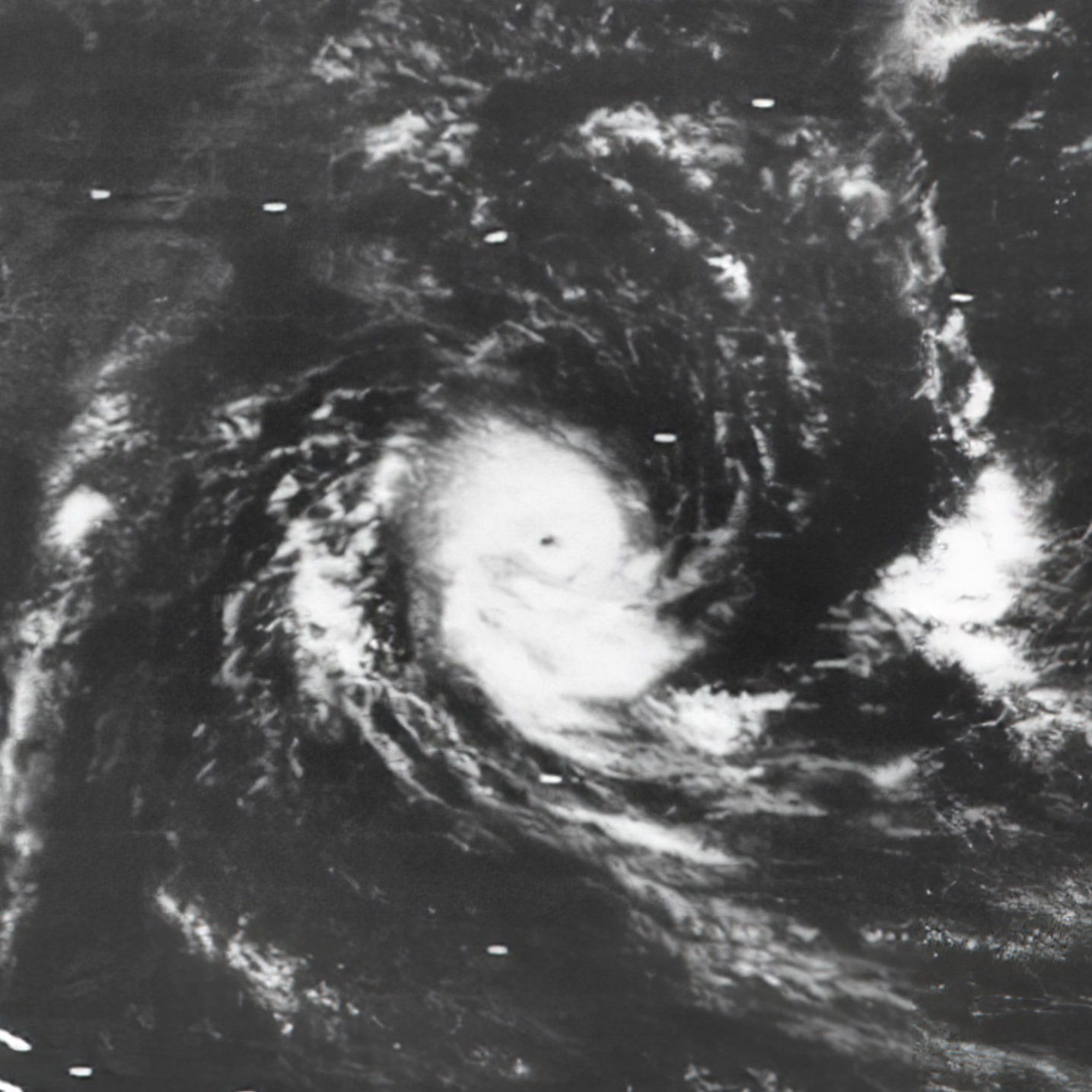
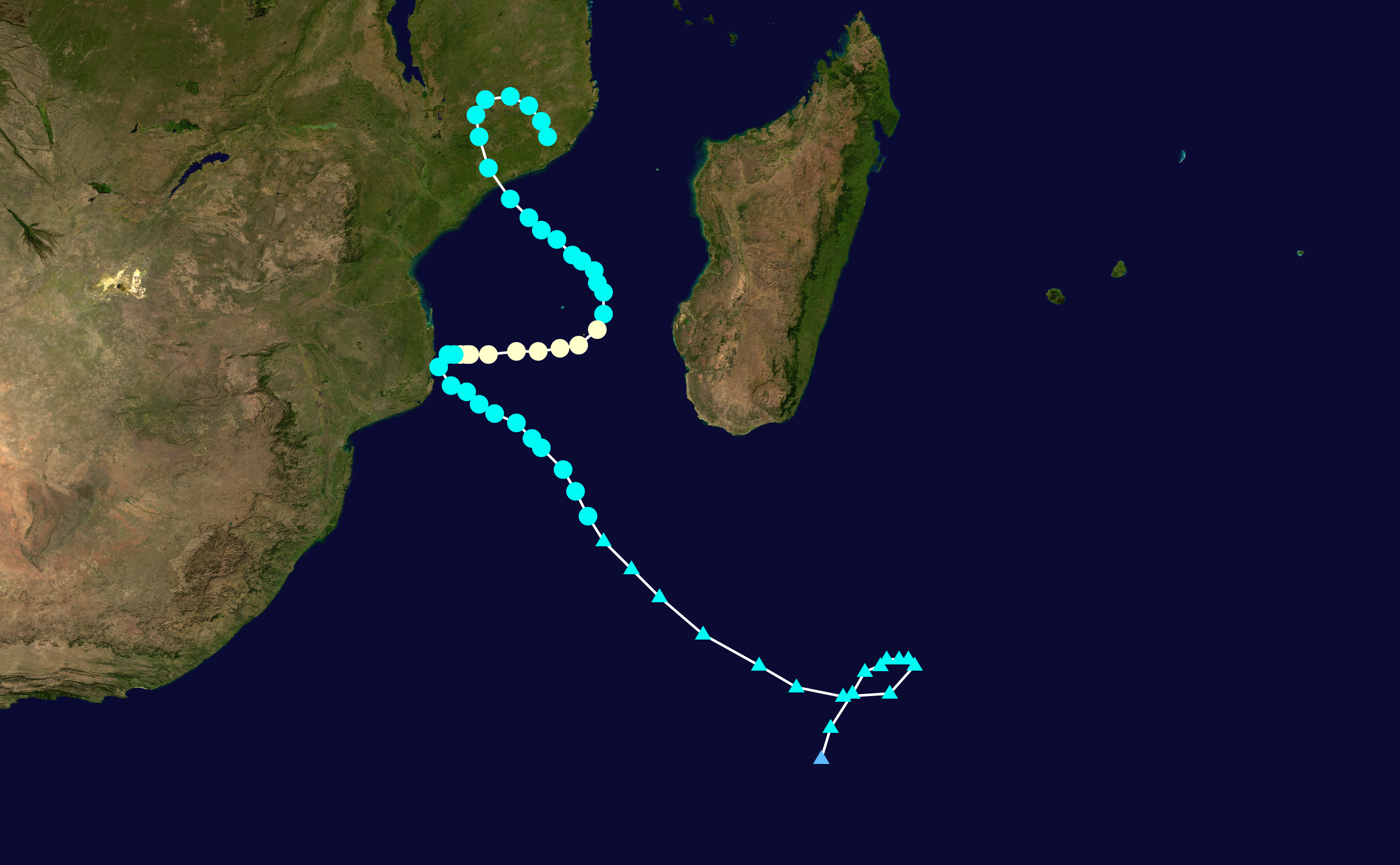
- Duration: March 12 – March 22
- Peak intensity: 120 km/h (75 mph) (10-min);

== See also ==
- Atlantic hurricane seasons: 1970, 1971
- Eastern Pacific hurricane seasons: 1970, 1971
- Western Pacific typhoon seasons: 1970, 1971
- North Indian Ocean cyclone seasons: 1970, 1971
