= Sproat =

Sproat is a surname and given name. Notable people with the name include:

== Surname ==
- Alexander Sproat (1834–1890), Ontario land surveyor, businessman and political figure
- Ann McKay Sproat (born 1936), American artist, illustrator and writer of children's books
- Brandon Sproat (born 2000), American professional baseball pitcher
- Clyde Sproat (1930–2008), Hawaiian falsetto musician
- Ebenezer Sproat (1752–1805), colonel in the Continental Army during the American Revolutionary War, and a pioneer to the Ohio Country
- Gilbert Malcolm Sproat (1834–1913), Scottish-born Canadian businessman, office holder, and author
- Hugh Sproat (born 1952), Scottish footballer who played as a goalkeeper
- Iain Sproat (born 1938), retired British Conservative politician and former Member of Parliament
- Matt Sproat, award-winning Hawaiian musician, singer, producer and story-teller
- Richard Sproat, computational linguist, researcher on text normalization and speech recognition
- Ron Sproat (1932–2009), screenwriter and playwright known for his work on Dark Shadows
- Steven Sproat (born 1960), English singer-songwriter, guitarist and ukulele player

== Given name ==
- James Sproat Brown (1824–1878), American lawyer and politician
- James Sproat Green (1792–1862), American lawyer
- Noble Sproat Heaney (1880–1955), American gynecologist
- David Sproat Kennedy (1791–1853), Scottish-American merchant and banker
- Jesse Sproat Miller (1865–1935), American politician and lawyer
- Eliza Sproat Turner (1826–1903), American writer, women's club founder and leader, abolitionist, suffragette

== Other uses ==
- Sproat Lake, lake in central Vancouver Island
- Sproat Lake Provincial Park, lake in central Vancouver Island
- Sproat Street/Adelaide Street station, QLine streetcar stops in Detroit, Michigan

== See also ==
- Sproatley
- Sprot (disambiguation)
- Sprout (disambiguation)
