= Spratt =

Spratt or Sprat may refer to:

== Arts, entertainment and media ==
- "Jack Sprat", a nursery rhyme
- Jack Spratt (fictional detective), a character in novels by Jasper Fforde
- Septimus Spratt, a character in British television series Downton Abbey
- Dylan Spratt, US born Entrepreneur
- Thomas Abel Brimage Spratt, English hydrographer

== Places ==
- Spratt, Michigan, United States
- Spratt, Ohio, United States

== Other uses ==
- Sprat, group of forage fish belonging to the genus Sprattus in the family Clupeidae
- Spratt (surname)
- Spratt Cemetery, near Fort Mill, York County, South Carolina, United States
- Spratt Model 107, an American seaplane
- Spratt Stadium, St. Joseph, Missouri, United States
- Spratt's, an American pet food manufacturer
- Spratt's Complex, a mixed-use development in Poplar, London

== See also ==
- Sea Spurge Remote Area Teams (SPRATS)
- Sproat
- Sprot (surname)
