= Port Alberni Bombers =

Junior ice hockey team

- City: Port Alberni
- League: VIJHL
- Division: North
- Founded: 2021
- Home arena: Alberni Valley Multiplex
- Colours: Red and black
- Owners: Olithan Sports & Entertainment
- General manager: Mike Doucette
- Head coach: Troy Newans
- Website: portalbernibombers.ca

The Port Alberni Bombers are a Junior ice hockey team in the Vancouver Island Junior Hockey League based in Port Alberni, British Columbia. The team debuted as an expansion franchise in the 2021–22 VIJHL season.

== Team identity ==
The team name, logo and colours allude to the red-and-white Martin JRM Mars water bomber aircraft associated with the Alberni Valley. The team has the same owners as the BCHL Alberni Valley Bulldogs.

Port Alberni Bombers

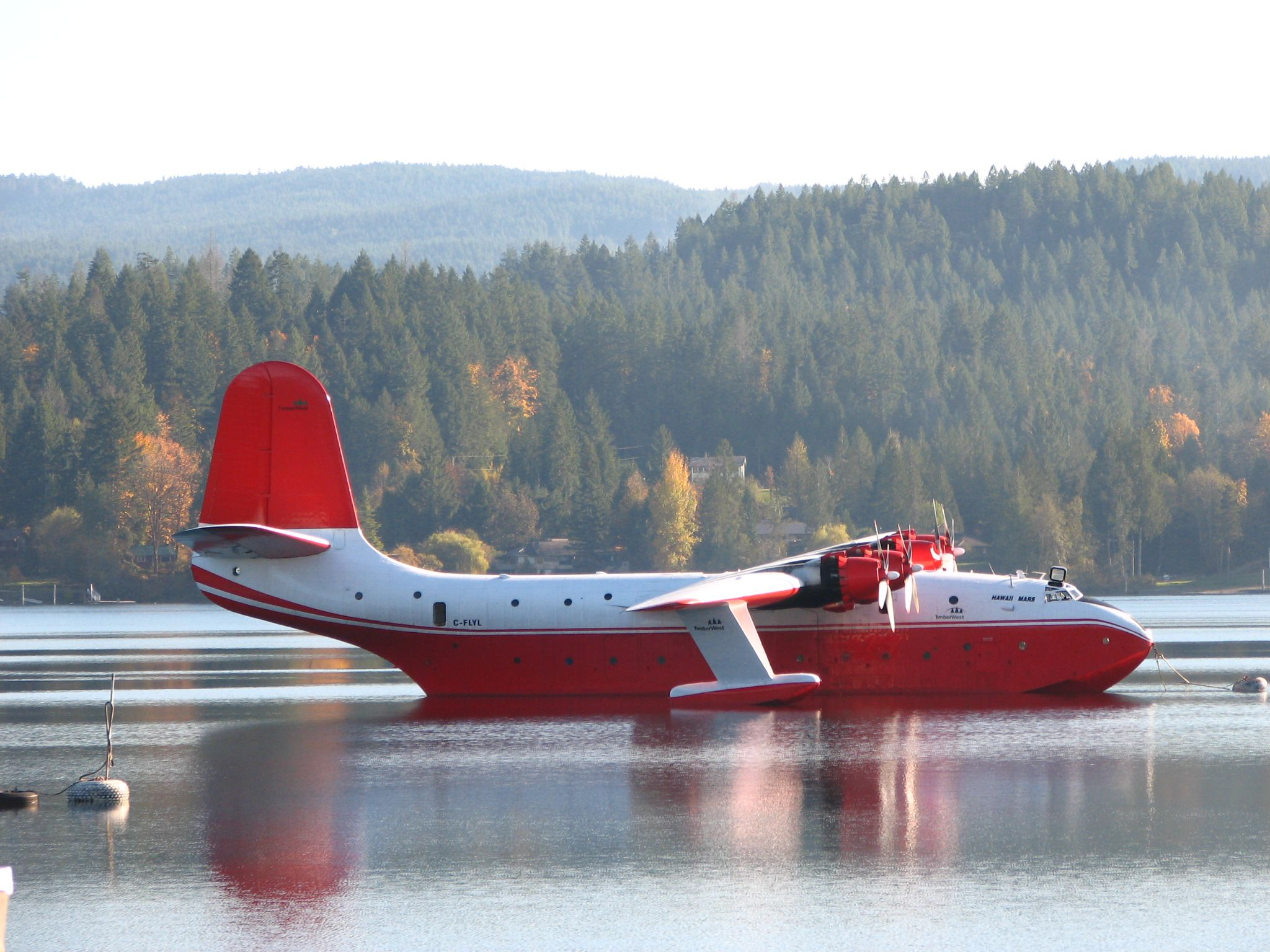
Moored on Sproat Lake, Vancouver Island. October 2006

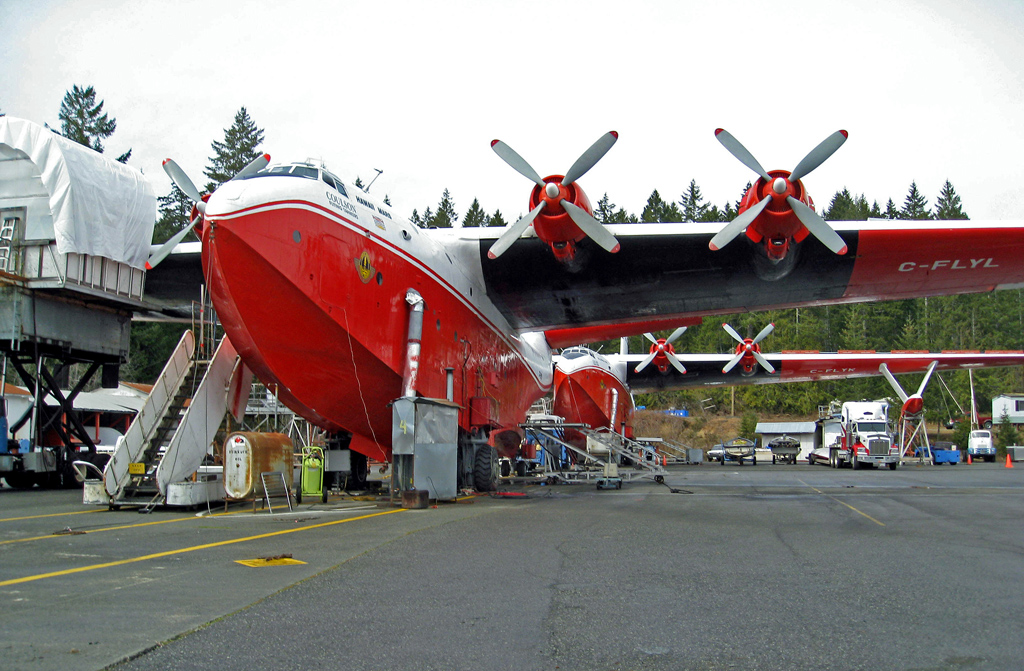
Undergoing winter maintenance in 2008 with Philippine Mars in the background

Martin JRM Mars C-FLYL, Hawaii Mars

== Arena ==
The team plays its home games in the 1,854-seat Alberni Valley Multiplex.

== History ==
The team finished its inaugural regular season in 4th place in the North division before being eliminated from competition after the first round of playoffs. They finished their second year in the same way. The team failed to qualify for the 2023–24 post-season after dropping to 5th place in the division. In 2024–25, the Bombers finished the regular season in second place in their division. After sweeping the Comox Valley Glacier Kings in the first round of the playoffs, they were eliminated by the Campbell River Storm in six games in the semifinal.

Season-by-season record
Season	GP	W	L	OTL	SOL	T	Pts	Finish	Playoffs
2021–22	50	19	28	2	1	0	41	4th in division 8th overall	Lost in 1st round against Campbell River (4:3)
2022–23	48	17	27	1	3	0	38	4th in division 8th overall	Lost in 1st round against Oceanside (4:0)
2023–24	48	8	37	1	2	0	19	5th in division 10th overall	Did not qualify
2024–25	48	31	13	4	0	0	66	2nd in division 4th overall	Won 1st round against Glacier Kings (4:0); Lost in semifinal against Campbell River (4:2)
2025–26	48	17	28	3	0	0	37	5th in division 8th overall	Did not qualify

Source: "2025–26 VIJHL standings". vijhl.com. Vancouver Island Junior Hockey League.
