= 2018 Port Alberni municipal election =

Port Alberni 2018 municipal election

- October 20, 2018

1 mayor; 6 seats on council
- Registered: 13678
- Turnout: 45.6%
- Mayoral Race

1 person elected by popular at large vote.; All candidates ran as independent.
Candidate	Sharie Marie Minions	Denis Sauvé	Mike Ruttan
Popular vote	2003	1472	1181
Candidate	John Douglas	Kevin Wright	Gary Robertson
Popular vote	872	523	155
Mayor before election
Mike Ruttan
Independent
Elected mayor
Sharie Minions
Independent
- City Council

Top 6 vote getters win seats.; Full list of candidates and results in main article.
Candidate	Debbie Haggard	Cindy Solda	Dan Washington
Popular vote	3369	3153	2637
Candidate	Helen Poon	Ron Paulson	Ron Corbeil
Popular vote	2277	2158	2122

The 2018 Port Alberni municipal election was held on October 20, 2018, on the same day as the municipal elections in British Columbia, Canada. Voters elected the mayor of Port Alberni, 6 city councillors and 6 SD70 school district trustees through plurality-at-large voting.

Previous councillor Sharie Minions was elected mayor over incumbent Mike Ruttan who came in third and councillor Denis Sauvé who was second. Debbie Haggard, Cindy Solda, Dan Washington, Helen Poon, Ron Corbeil, and Ron Paulson were elected councillors. Incumbent Chris Alemany was unsuccessful in his bid for re-election.

The City of Port Alberni is part of the Alberni-Clayoquot Regional District which is responsible for the SD70 School District trustee election as well as the election of directors in the electoral areas surrounding the City of Port Alberni. They include Cherry Creek (Area "F"), Beaver Creek (Area "E"), Sproat Lake (Area "D") and Beaufort (Area "B"), as well as the West Coast of Vancouver Island electoral areas of Long Beach (Area "C") and Bamfield (Area "A").

== Background ==
Mike Ruttan ran for a second term as Mayor. He was first elected mayor in 2014. Sharie Minions, a mortgage broker and Denis Sauvé, a former RCMP officer, were councillors elected in 2014 and serving with Mike Ruttan in his time as mayor.

== Retiring and Returning to Council ==
Jack McLeman did not run for re-election after serving three consecutive terms on council. Ron Paulson, Chris Alemany and Dan Washington ran as incumbents.

== Main Issues ==
This election focused heavily on the mayoral race with two councillors challenging the incumbent mayor. Major issues were rising homelessness and substance abuse in the city, development, and attraction of new industrial projects as traditional forestry related industries continued to decline. Competing visions included public safety focused platform from Sauvé, a progressive industrial focus from Ruttan, and a progressive re-development focus from Minions.

Costs and managerial staffing were top issues in the City and public discourse as well as climate change related issues.

First Nations issues including reconciliation and the renaming of schools and streets were key issues during the previous term and leading into the election.

A major point in the campaign for councillor positions was a controversy surrounding incumbent Chris Alemany actions as an anonymous user on a local Facebook group. Successful candidate Helen Poon was also notable as a newcomer and business owner in the community.

== Mayoral election ==
=== Results ===
Unofficial and Official results are published by the City of Port Alberni

Results for Mayor of Port Alberni
Party	Candidate	Votes	Percent	2014 Election	Elected
Independent	Sharie Minions	2003	32.1%	-	✓
Independent	Denis Sauvé	1472	23.6%	-	
Independent	Mike Ruttan	1181	18.9%	-	
Independent	John Douglas	872	14.0%	-	
Independent	Kevin Wright	523	8.4%	-	
Independent	Gary Robertson	155	2.5%	-	
Eligible Voters		13678			
Total Ballots Cast		6240			
Turnout		45.6%			

== City council elections ==
=== Results ===
Results for City Council of Port Alberni
Party	Candidate	Votes	Percent	2014 Election	Elected
Independent	Debbie Haggard	3369	53.9%	-	✓
Independent	Cindy Solda	3153	50.5%	-	✓
Independent	Dan Washington	2637	42.3%	-	✓
Independent	Helen Poon	2277	36.5%	-	✓
Independent	Ron Paulson	2158	34.6%	-	✓
Independent	Ron Corbeil	2122	34.0%	-	✓
Independent	Hira Chopra	1946	31.2%	-	
Independent	Seva Dhaliwal	1626	26.1%	-	
Independent	Char Patterson	1538	24.6%	-	
Independent	Kris Patterson	1337	21.4%	-	
Independent	Michael Moore	1180	18.9%	-	
Independent	Christopher Alemany	1113	17.8%	-	
Independent	Helen Robertson	944	15.1	-	
Independent	Todd Patola	939	15.0%	-	
Independent	Aaron Brevick	697	11.2%	-	
Independent	Blain Pouliot	689	11.0%	-	
Independent	Matthew Pearson	601	9.6%	-	
Independent	Rick Ethier	517	8.3%	-	
Independent	Karl Hamagishi	320	5.1%	-	
Independent	Jerome Luchka	94	1.5%	-	
Total valid votes		6240			
Total rejected ballots		5			
Turnout		45.6%			

== Voter Turnout Comparison ==
The City of Port Alberni at the time included in its official declaration of results, a comparison of turnout over the previous 8 voting opportunities in the City. Their table is reproduced below:

Year and Occasion	General Voting	Advance and Special Voting	New Registrations	Voter Turnout
1998 Arena Referendum (City Voting Only)	5324	300	500	44.0%
1999 Municipal Election	6307	974	519	57.5%
2001 By-Election (1 Mayor & 2 Council)	4164	509	169	42.5%
2002 Municipal Election	4599	367	215	45.6%
2005 Municipal Election	3316	321	116	27.8%
2008 Municipal Election	3193	685	189	29.3%
2011 Municipal Election	3972	798	246	35.5%
2014 Municipal Election	4462	1557	380	46.4%
2018 Municipal Election	4416	1824	NA	45.6%
