= Sprout =

Sprout or Sprouts may refer to:

== Botany ==
- Brussels sprout, an edible vegetable of the brassica genus
- Shoot, the early growth of a plant
- Sprouting, the practice of germinating seeds, often for food purposes
  - Alfalfa sprouts
  - bean sprouts:
    - Soybean sprout
    - Mung bean sprout
  - Broccoli sprouts

== Places ==
- Sprout, Kentucky
- Sprout Creek, in Dutchess County, New York
- Sprouts of the Mohawk River, a section of the Mohawk River

== People ==
- Sprout (surname)
- Sprout, a pseudonym of the Irish author Michael Carroll (born 1966)
- Sprouts Elder (1904–1957), international motorcycle speedway rider

== Arts, entertainment, and media ==
- Sprout (2012 TV series), a series of Japanese drama aired on Nippon Television
- Sprout (block), a program block on Universal Kids, previously an American television network
- Sprout (novel), a 2009 young adult novel by Dale Peck
- Sprouts (game), a pencil-and-paper game
- Little Green Sprout, the sidekick to the Jolly Green Giant advertising mascot
- Sprout, a former name of Universal Kids, an American pay television channel

== Brands and enterprises ==
- Sprout (computer), a Hewlett-Packard computer introduced in 2014
- Sprout World, a maker of pencils
- Sprouts Farmers Market, an Arizona-based chain of specialty grocery stores

== Other uses ==
- Sprouts of capitalism, features of the economy of the late Ming and early Qing dynasties
