= Matt Sproat =

- Born: Matthew Kawaiola Sproat; 1972 (age 53–54)
- Genres: Hawaiian
- Instruments: Vocals, Guitar, Ukulele, Bass

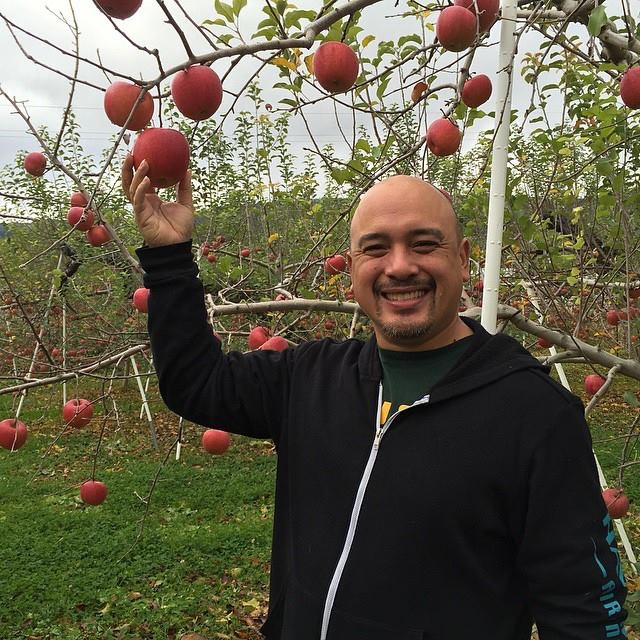
Matt Sproat, taken in Japan

Matt Sproat is a Nā Hōkū Hanohano Award-winning Hawaiian musician, singer, producer, and story-teller. He is a guitarist and singer with the Hawaiian music trio, Waipuna. He is the great-grandnephew of the legendary musician and story-teller Kindy Sproat, who was a 1988 NEA National Heritage Fellow.

== Early life ==
Sproat was born on the island of O‘ahu and grew up in the North Shore town of Hau‘ula. He is a 1990 graduate of Kamehameha Schools.

== Personal life ==
Sproat is married to business executive, author, and political commentator Trisha Kehaulani Watson-Sproat.

== Career ==
In 2008, he and fellow musician Kale Hannahs formed the Hawaiian music group, Waipuna. In 2009, they released their first album, Mana‘o Pili. Two years later, their second album, E Ho‘i Mai was released. It would win three Nā Hōkū Hanohano Awards. That same year, David Kamakahi, son of legendary Hawaiian guitarist and musician, Dennis Kamakahi, joined the band. The trio released the extended play ("EP") Nāpili in 2013. This album would win two Nā Hōkū Hanohano Awards, one for Best EP, and a solo award for Kamakahi, for Best Instrumental Composition of the Year ("Nāpili Bay"). The group's fourth released, E Mau Ke Aloha, followed in 2014. For their 10-year anniversary, the group recorded and released their fifth collaboration, the self-titled album Waipuna. It would win that year's Nā Hōkū Hanohano Award for "Best Hawaiian Single" for "He Aloha Waiau".

In 2018, Sproat appeared in the Project Kuleana video for the song "Hau‘ula Paka."

Sproat is also a master woodworker, and founded his own indigenous wood craft company The Kealohi Collection.

== Discography ==
- Aloha Festivals Hawaiian Falsetto Contest Winners Vol 5. (2004, Various Artists)
- Mana‘o Pili (2009, Waipuna)
- E Ho‘i Mai (2011, Waipuna)
- Nāpili (2013, Waipuna)
- E Mau Ke Aloha (2014, Waipuna)
- Waipuna (2019, Waipuna)
