= Sprot =

Sprot or Sprott or Sprotte may refer to:

- Sprot (surname)
- Sprott, Alabama, an unincorporated community in Perry County, Alabama
- Sprotte, a river in Germany

== See also ==
- Sprott School of Business
- Sprott-Shaw College
- Spratt (disambiguation)
- Sport (disambiguation)
