= Taylor Arm Provincial Park =

Provincial park on Vancouver Island in British Columbia, Canada

- IUCN category II (national park)
- Location within Vancouver Island Location within British Columbia
- Interactive map of Taylor Arm Provincial Park
- Location: British Columbia, Canada
- Nearest city: Port Alberni
- Coordinates: 49°16′33″N 125°02′40″W
- Area: 0.71 km^{2} (0.27 sq mi)
- Established: March 1, 1979
- Governing body: BC Parks

Taylor Arm Provincial Park is a provincial park in British Columbia, Canada, located on the north side of Sproat Lake 23 km northwest of Port Alberni on Vancouver Island. Situated along Highway 4, the 71-hectare park has few services but provides group camping sites, undeveloped beaches, and day-use areas. The group camping site has pit toilets and a hand pump water supply, and is connected to the lake shore via a trail that passes under the highway.

== Creeks ==
Three watercourses run through the park, emptying into Sproat Lake: Friesen Creek, Clutesi Creek, and Bookhout Creek.
