= Fossli Provincial Park =

Provincial park on Vancouver Island in British Columbia, Canada

- IUCN category II (national park)
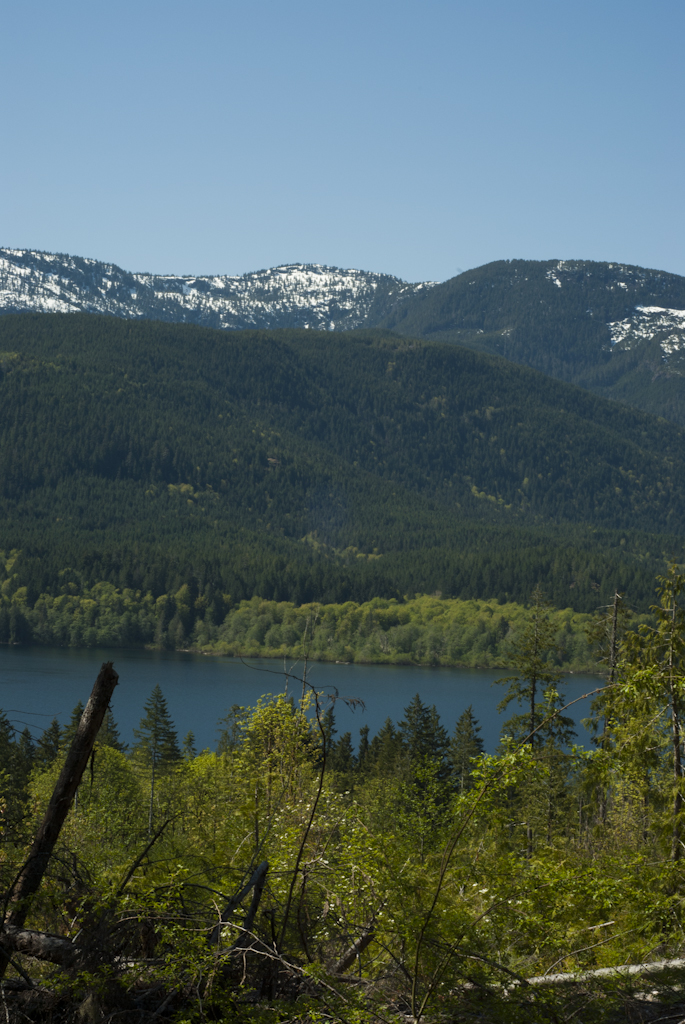
- Fossli Park viewed from across Stirling Arm on Sproat Lake

- Location within Vancouver Island Location within British Columbia
- Interactive map of Fossli Provincial Park
- Nearest town: Port Alberni, British Columbia
- Coordinates: 49°15′00″N 124°57′00″W
- Area: 52 ha (130 acres)
- Established: November 7, 1974

Fossli Provincial Park is a provincial park in British Columbia, Canada, located on Stirling Arm of Sproat Lake on Vancouver Island. The 52-hectare park, west of Port Alberni, is accessible by water or private logging road. It has few services, but has a 30-minute hiking trail to an old homestead site. The homestead belonged to Helen and Armour Ford, who donated the land for the park to the province in 1974. Saint Andrew's Creek runs through the park, and is a fall spawning ground for coho salmon.

== Name origin ==
The name of the park derives from local names conferred by an early Norwegian Canadian immigrant after his home in Eidfjord Municipality in Norway. The name means "waterfall in the valley".

== Gallery ==
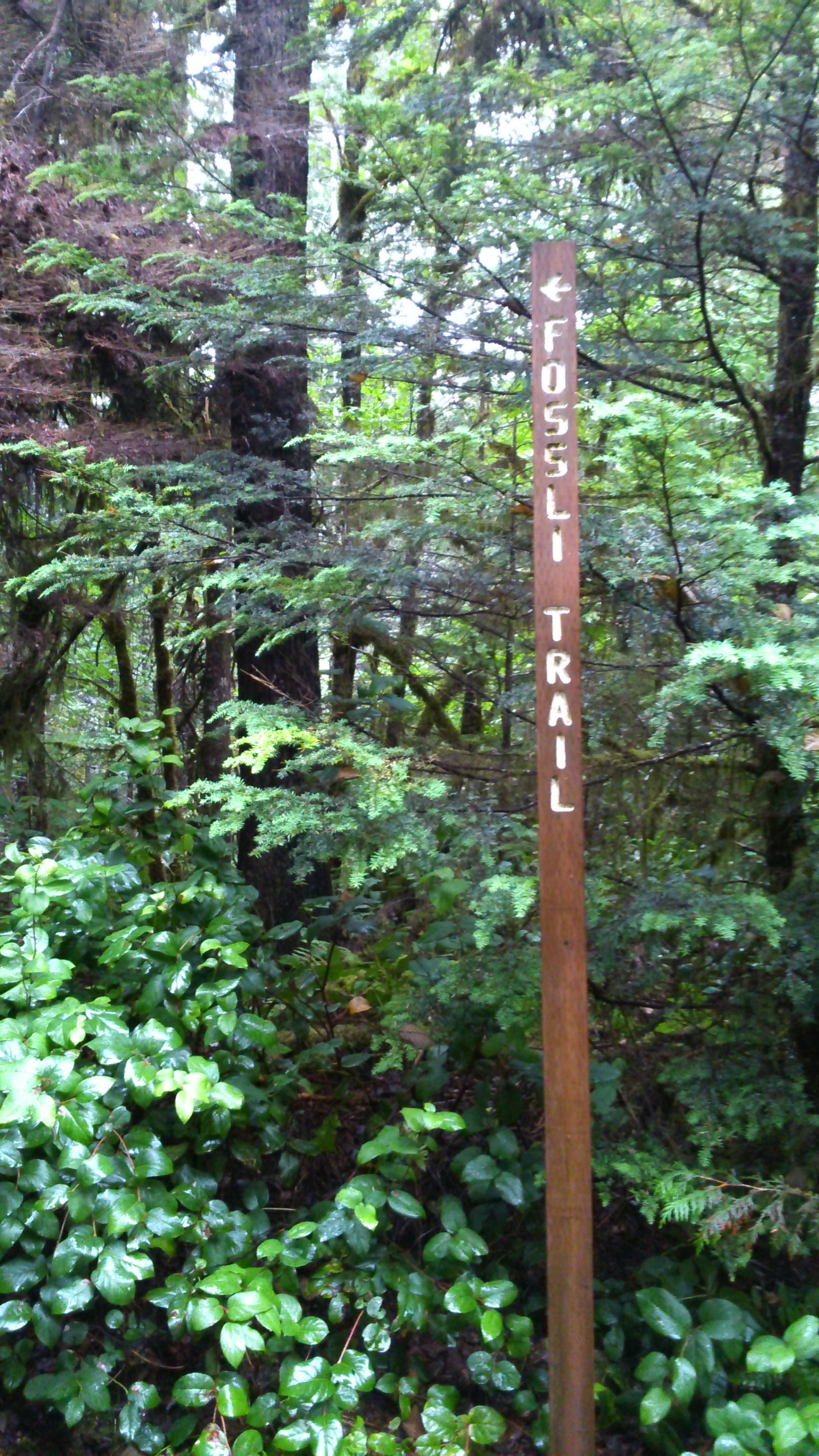
Sign for Fossli Trail rises above a salal bush

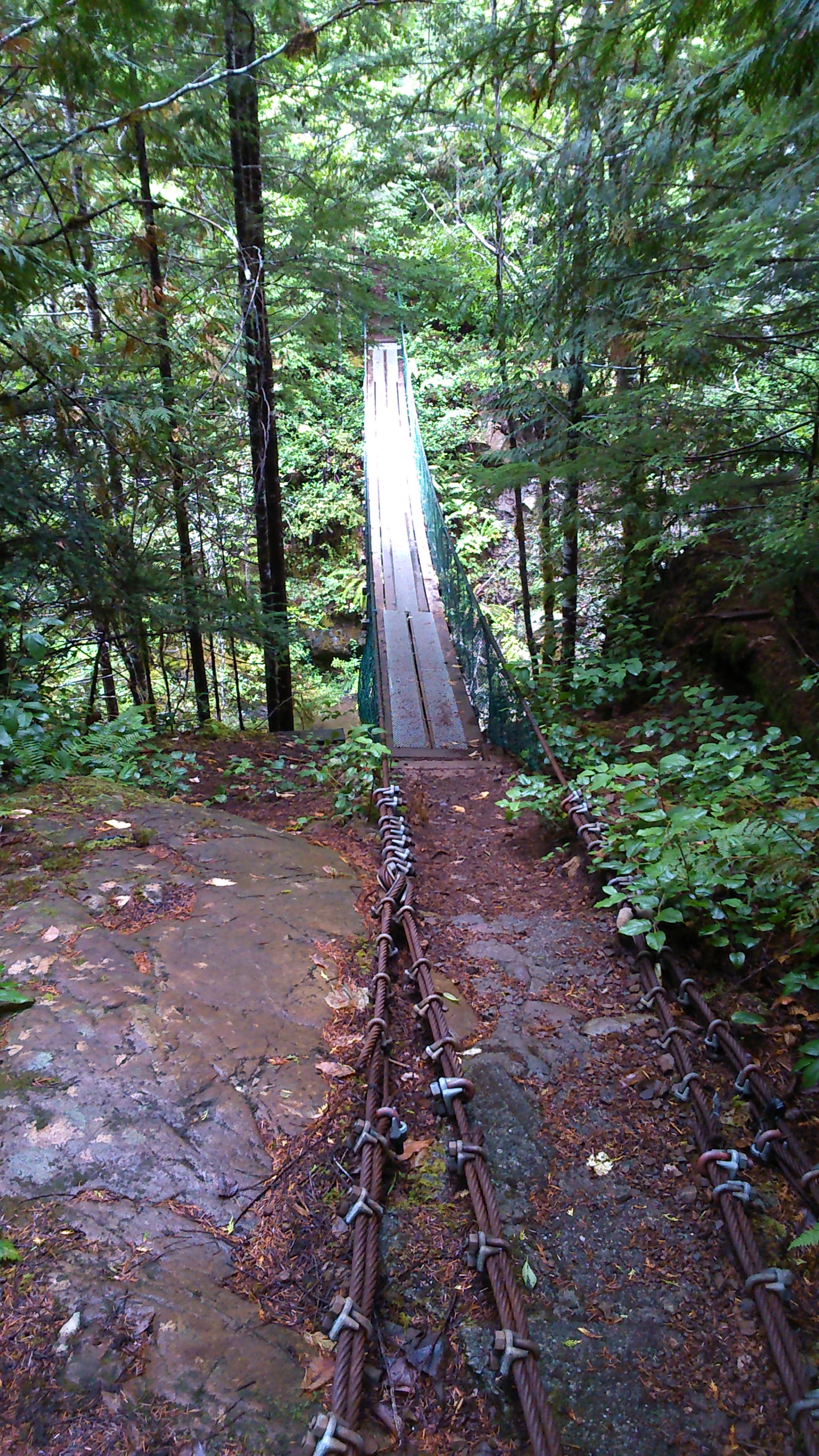
Footbridge on trail

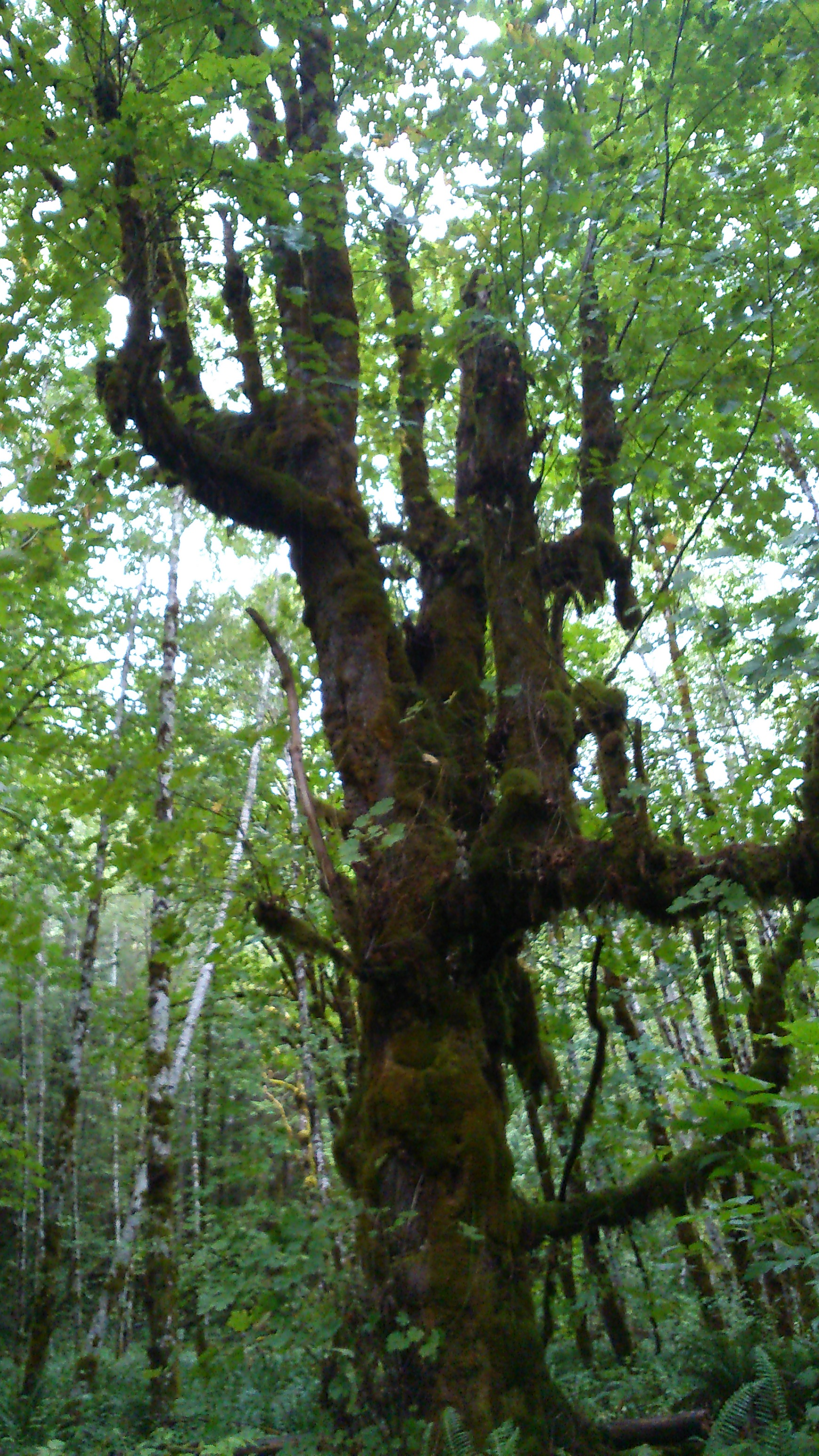
Giant bigleaf maple covered in moss

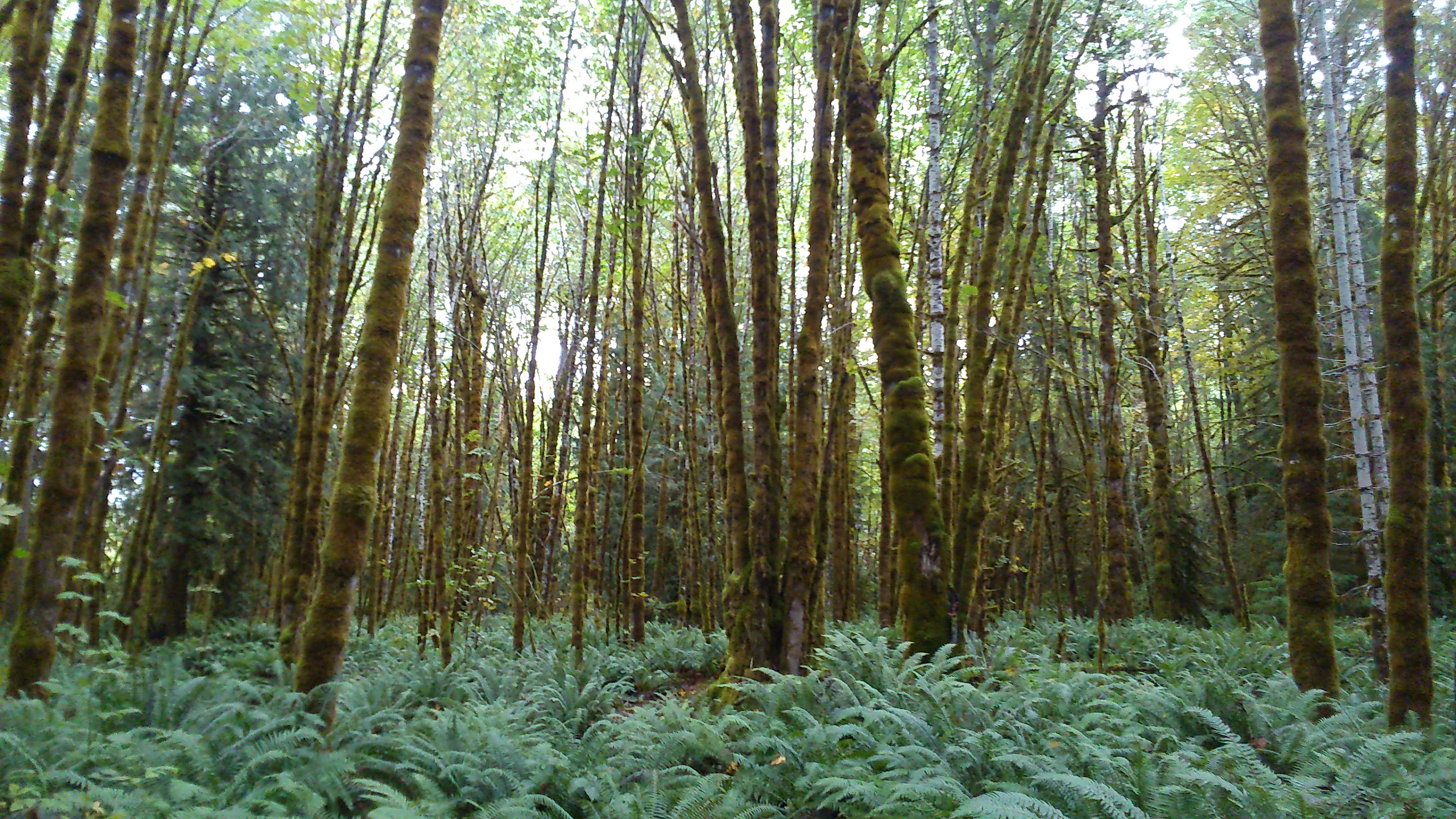
Moss-covered alders rise from a floor of sword fern

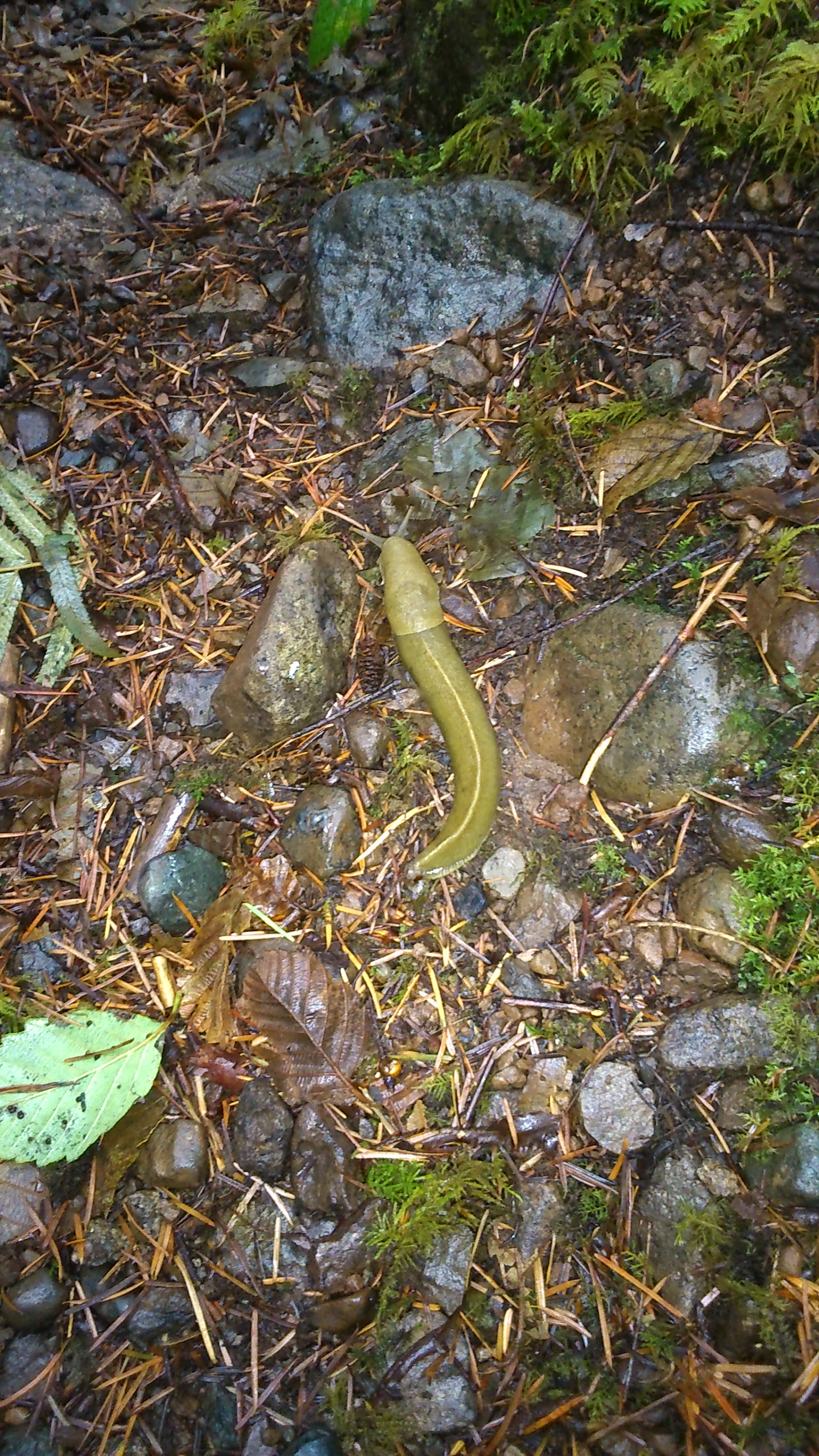
Banana slug along the trail on wet day

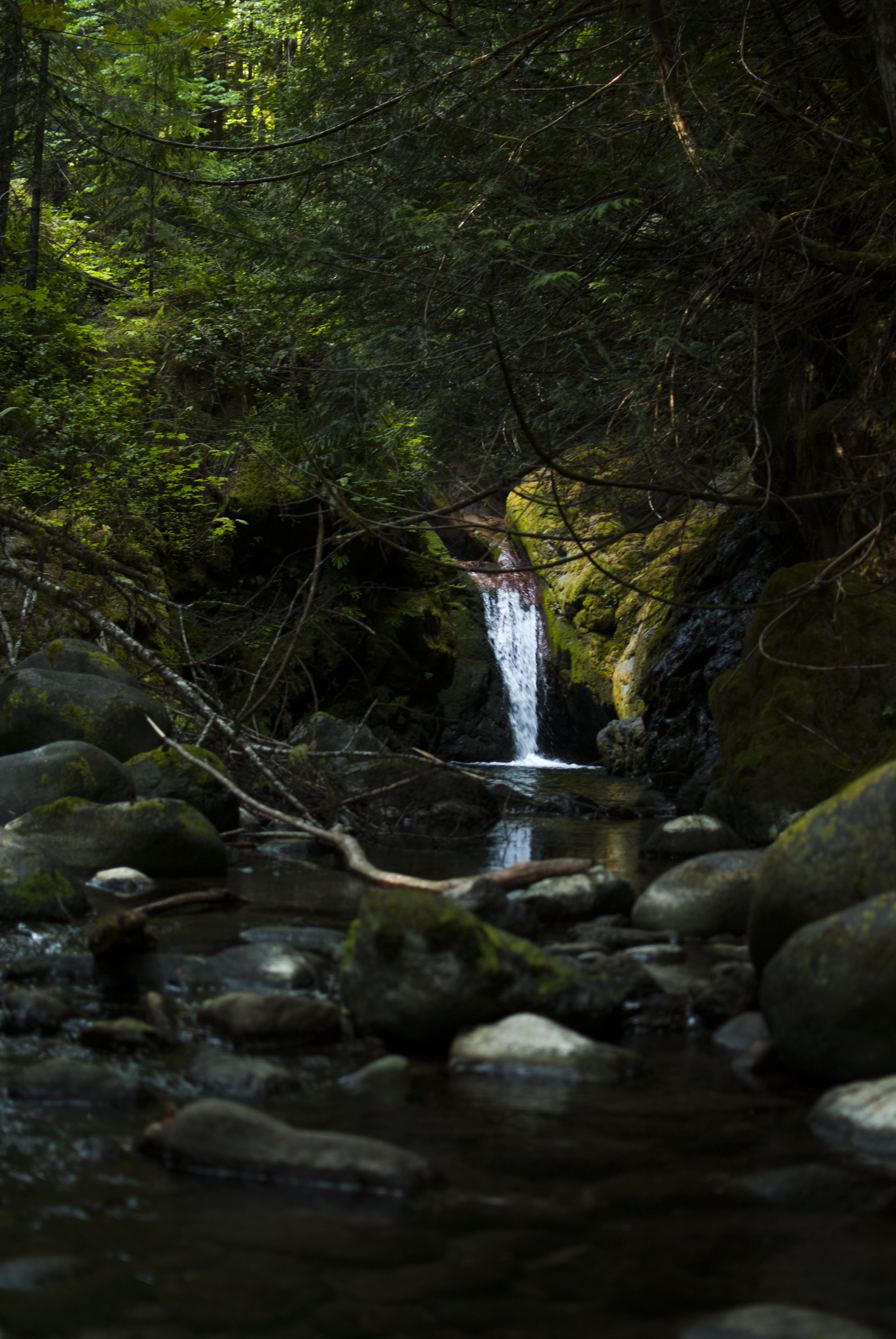
Waterfall on the creek in the park

== See also ==
- List of British Columbia Provincial Parks
