= Sprot (surname) =

Sprot (or Sprott or Sprotte) is a family name. Notable people with the name include:

- Adrian Sprott, Scottish footballer
- Sir Alexander Sprot, 1st Baronet
  - Sprot Baronets
- Bert Sprotte, German actor
- Cecilia Sprot, British viscountess
- Charles B. Sprott, Canadian former professional wrestler, known as Ricky Hunter
- Clint Sprott, professor of physics
- Edward Sprot, scottish cricketer
- Eric Sprott, Canadian billionaire, Sprott School of Business
- George Sprott, graphic novel
- George Washington Sprott, Scottish liturgical scholar
- Hemel Sprot, imaginary animal
- Michael Sprott, boxer
- Thomas Sprott, monk and chronicler
- Thomas Sprott or Thomas Spratt, martyr
- Thomas Sprott, bishop
- W. J. H. 'Sebastian' Sprott, psychologist and sociologist
- William S. Pollitzer, anatomist

== See also ==
- Sprot (disambiguation)
- Spratt (surname)
