= Spratt (surname) =

Spratt or Sprat is a surname of British origin, first recorded in the Domesday Book of 1086 as Sprot in Essex and Sprott in Dorset. It may derive from 'sprot' (twig or small branch) or the similar 'sprit' (a small pole). An alternative derivation is from 'espirit' (an elf). Originally it was a personal name and may have been used as a nickname for a slender person.

The name may refer to:

- Amanda Spratt (born 1987), Australian cyclist
- Dean Spratt (1952–2007), American traffic reporter
- Frederick Spratt (1927–2008), American artist
- George A. Spratt (1870–1934), American inventor
- George W. Spratt (1844–1934), American politician
- Harry Spratt (1888–1969), Major League Baseball player
- Isaac Spratt (1799–1876), British businessman
- James Spratt (Royal Navy officer) (1771–1853), officer in the Royal Navy
- James Spratt (Canadian politician) (1877–1960), Newfoundland builder and politician
- Jimmy Spratt (1951–2021), Northern Irish politician
- John Spratt (1942–2024), American politician
- Jonathan Spratt (born 1986), British rugby player
- Mary Oates Spratt (1852–1937), American historian
- Norman Spratt (1885–1944), British pilot appointed to the Order of the British Empire in 1925
- Pete Spratt (born 1971), American mixed martial artist
- Philip Spratt (1902–1971), British writer
- Stephen Spratt (born 1960), Irish cyclist
- Thomas Sprat (1635–1713), British bishop
- Thomas Abel Brimage Spratt (1811–1888), British admiral and geologist
- Tommy Spratt (born 1941), British football player
- Vicky Spratt (fl. 2013–2018), British journalist, documentary maker, and housing rights campaigner
- Walter Spratt (1889–1945), English professional footballer

== See also ==
- George Spratt (disambiguation)
- James Spratt (disambiguation)
- Spratt (disambiguation)
