= Spratt, Ohio =

Unincorporated community in Ohio, U.S.

Coordinates: 39°52′20″N 81°43′58″W

Spratt is an unincorporated community in Muskingum County, in the U.S. state of Ohio.

== History ==
A post office called Spratt was established in 1884, and remained in operation until 1955. Besides the post office, Spratt had a station on the Bellaire, Zanesville and Cincinnati Railroad.
