= Sprout (surname) =

Sprout is a surname. Notable people with the surname include:

- Bob Sprout (born 1941), American baseball pitcher
- Jonathan Sprout (born 1952), American singer-songwriter
- Pomona Sprout, fictional character in the Harry Potter franchise
- Tobin Sprout (born 1955), American musician
