= Gilbert Malcolm Sproat =

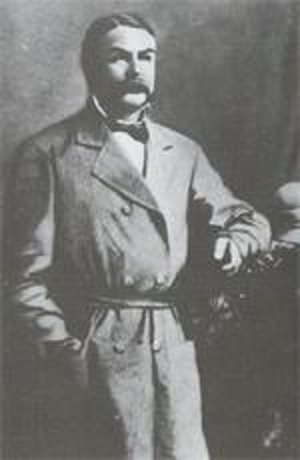
- Gilbert Sproat
- Born: 19 April 1834; Kirkcudbright, Scotland
- Died: 4 June 1913 (aged 79); Victoria, British Columbia, Canada
- Occupations: Businessman, Office holder, Author

Gilbert Malcolm Sproat (19 April 1834 – 4 June 1913) was a Scottish-born Canadian businessman, office holder, and author.

== Biography ==
Born in Brighouse Farm Borgue near Kirkcudbright, Scotland, he arrived on Vancouver Island in 1860, where he helped to found the first sawmill in Port Alberni, British Columbia. On 24 July. 1863 he was made a justice of the peace for the Colony of Vancouver Island. When the sawmill burnt down in 1865, Sproat returned to England, but maintained his interest in the affairs of the colony, which was united with the mainland in 1866. Sproat's fascination with the First Nations people he encountered on Vancouver Island, led to his best remembered book, The Nootka:Scenes and studies of savage life, which appeared in 1868. In 1870 he wrote Education of the Rural Poor which argued for the extension of elementary education to all, including agricultural laborers. Following British Columbia's entry into Canadian Confederation in 1871, Sproat became the new province's agent general in London, a position he held from 1872 until his return to the province in 1876. Beginning in 1883, Sproat began travelling to the Interior of British Columbia, especially to the Kootenay region, where he held several regional offices. After 1898, Sproat returned to Victoria, where he spent the majority of his time writing. He died there on 4 June 1913.

== Legacy ==
Sproat Lake and Sproat Lake Provincial Park on Vancouver Island are named in his honour by Robert Brown.
