= Sprout World =

- Company type: Private company
- Industry: Stationery
- Founded: 2013; 13 years ago
- Founder: Michael Stausholm
- Headquarters: Copenhagen, Denmark
- Area served: Worldwide
- Products: Plantable pencil
- Website: sproutworld.com

Sprout World is a Danish company that develops sustainable and plantable writing tools. The company was established in 2013 by Danish entrepreneur Michael Stausholm.

The company's main product is the Sprout Pencil, which was originally invented by three students from Massachusetts Institute of Technology (MIT) in Boston, US. Once the pencil is too short to use, it can be planted and a seed embedded in the end of the pencil can germinate and grow into a herb or flower.

Sprout is commercially successful in Denmark and a number of other European countries including Northern America. Today, the company sells the Sprout pencils in more than 80 countries.

Currently, Sprout has offices in Denmark and the US.
