= James Spratt =

James Spratt may refer to:

- James Spratt (Royal Navy officer) (1771–1853), officer in the Royal Navy
- James Spratt (died 1880), American entrepreneur and founder of Spratt's
- James Spratt, early settler of Blossom Park
- James Spratt (Canadian politician) (1877–1960), Newfoundland builder and politician
- Jimmy Spratt (1951–2021), Unionist politician from Northern Ireland
