= Sproat Lake Provincial Park =

Provincial park on Vancouver Island in British Columbia, Canada

- IUCN category II (national park)
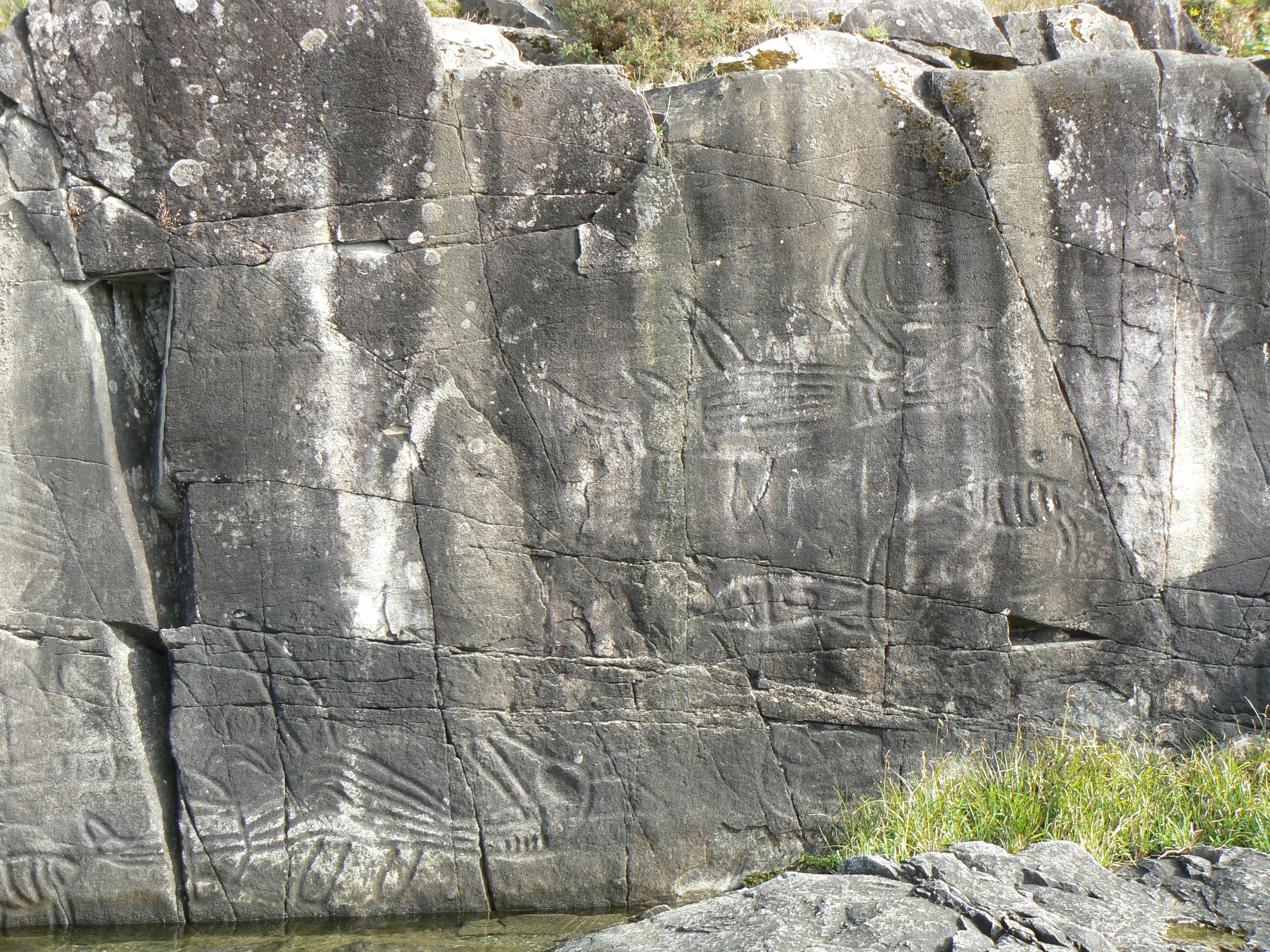
- Petroglyphs

- Location within British Columbia
- Interactive map of Sproat Lake Provincial Park
- Location: British Columbia, Canada
- Nearest city: Port Alberni
- Coordinates: 49°17′42″N 124°55′45″W
- Area: 0.43 km^{2} (0.17 sq mi)
- Established: June 6, 1966
- Governing body: BC Parks
- Website: bcparks.ca/sproat-lake-park/

Sproat Lake Provincial Park is a provincial park near Port Alberni in British Columbia, Canada's Vancouver Island. Its name derives from a lake named after 19th century entrepreneur and colonial official Gilbert Malcolm Sproat.

== Petroglyphs ==
One of the park's most significant features is a panel of petroglyphs called "K’ak’awin" on lakeshore rocks depicting mythological figures. Though little is known of the origin of the prehistoric images, the area has been traditionally occupied by the Hupacasath First Nation.

== Park features ==
The 39-hectare park on Highway 4 is 15 kilometres west of Port Alberni and is a popular recreation area featuring swimming and boating in Sproat Lake and camping. On the north shore of the lake, there is a popular boat launch, a small beach and 58 vehicle-accessible campsites in the park. The park is near the home base of Coulson Flying Tankers, which operates Martin Mars water bombers.
