= Clyde Sproat =

American musician (1930–2008)

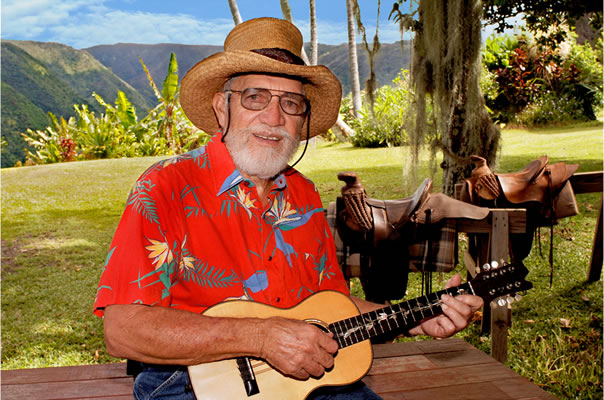
Sproat in 1988

Clyde Halemaʻumaʻu "Kindy" Sproat (November 21, 1930 – December 15, 2008) was a Hawaiian falsetto musician.

Sproat was born in Honokane Iki, North Kohala, Hawaiʻi and died in Hawaiʻi.

He was a recipient of a 1988 National Heritage Fellowship awarded by the National Endowment for the Arts, which is the United States government's highest honor in the folk and traditional arts.
