= Sproat Lake =

Lake near Port Alberni, British Columbia

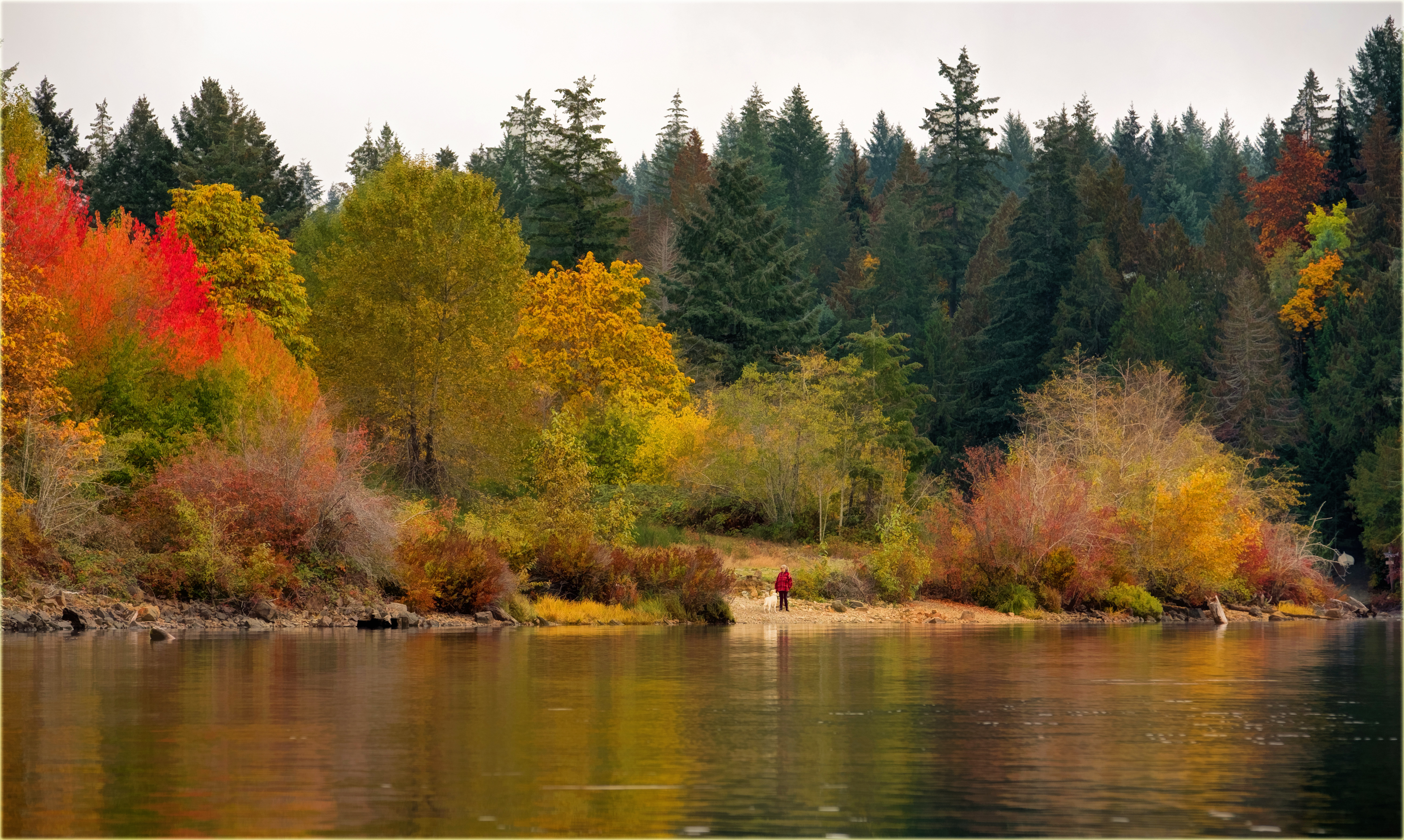
- Fall colours at Sproat Lake

- Location within Vancouver Island
- Location: Vancouver Island, British Columbia
- Coordinates: 49°16′N 125°02′W
- Basin countries: Canada
- Surface area: 3,775 ha (9,330 acres)
- Average depth: 74 m (243 ft)
- Max. depth: 195 m (640 ft)
- Shore length^{1}: 90.8 km (56.4 mi)
- ^{1} Shore length is not a well-defined measure.

Sproat Lake is a lake on central Vancouver Island in British Columbia, Canada. It was known as Kleecoot, meaning "wide open" by local indigenous people.

Roughly cross-shaped with four arms, it is over 25 kilometres in length, and has 90.8 kilometres of shoreline. Former home of the last Martin Mars type waterbombers, and near Port Alberni, Sproat Lake is a popular summer recreational area for the Alberni Valley. Highway 4 runs along its north shore.

The lake maintains a small wintering population of Marbled Murrelets which also nest in the area, the only freshwater alcids on Earth.

In August of 2023, Sproat Lake was voted British Columbia's Best Lake by CBC's viewers.

== History ==
Sproat Lake is best known for being a scenic vacation spot. Yet, to archaeologists, it's a site left by Archaic people no older than 11,000 BCE. The bow and arrow reached the region sometime early in this period, between 750 and 100 (cal) BCE (Blitz 1988; Pettigrew 1990; Ross 1990).

The K’ak’awin petroglyph may represent a mythical or actual sea creature from ancient times. Many believe they were carved by the Nuu Chah nulth ancestors in what is now called British Columbia.

Until 1864 this lake was known by its anglicized Nootka name of Kleecoot. From then it was renamed by Robert Brown of the Vancouver Island Exploring Expedition as Sproat Lake in honour of entrepreneur and colonial official Gilbert Malcolm Sproat.

== Forest fire service ==
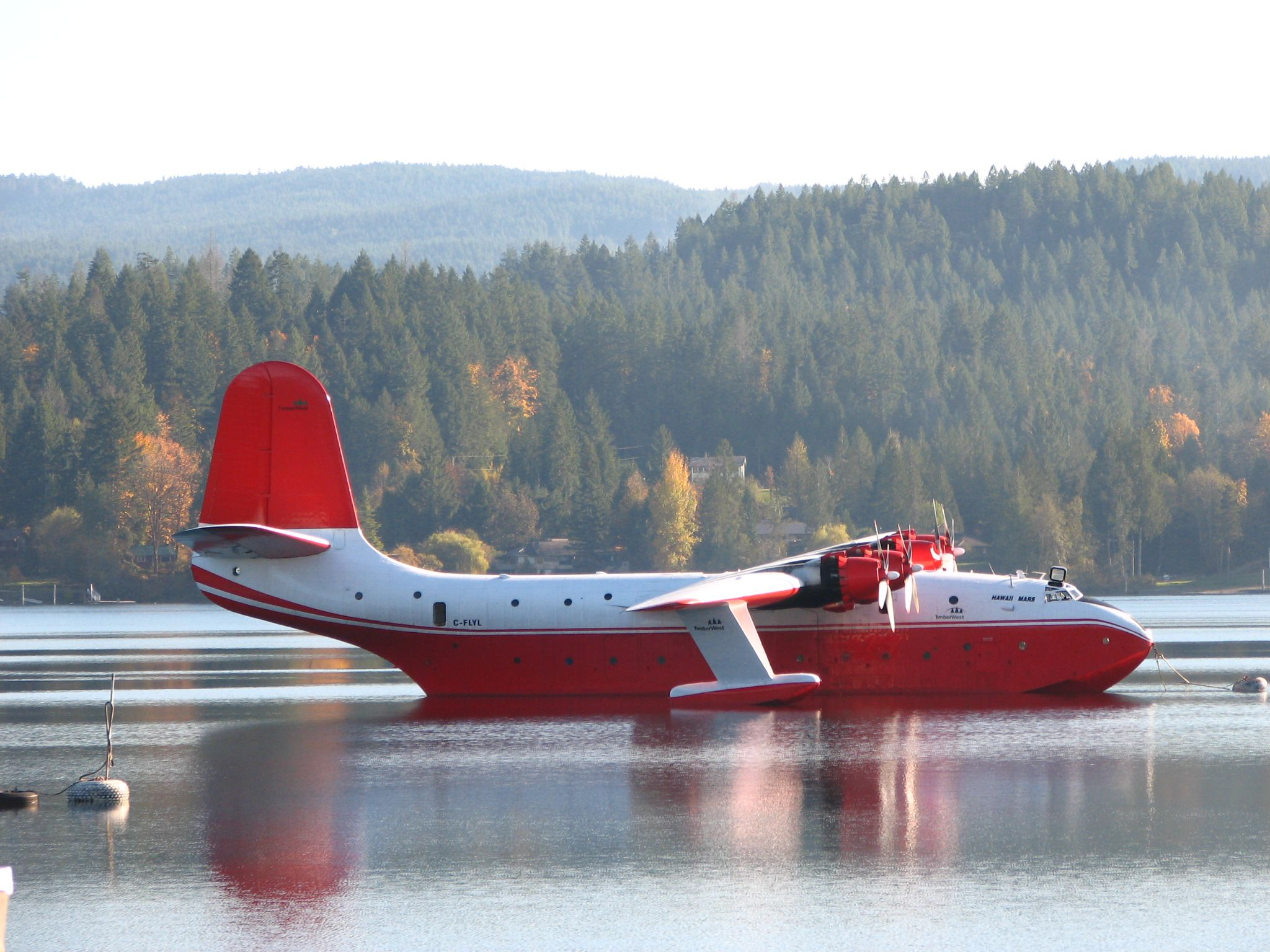
The Hawaii Mars ("redtail"), 30 July 2009

In 1959 four Martin JRM Mars large, four-engined cargo transport flying boats, designed and built by the Martin Company for the United States Navy during World War II, were acquired by Forest Industries Flying Tankers (FIFT) to use as firefighting water bombers. The company was formed to bid for the four aircraft and a large spares inventory, and represented a consortium of British Columbia forest companies. The bid was accepted and the sale completed in December 1959. The four aircraft were flown to Fairey Aviation at Victoria, British Columbia, for conversion into water bombers. The conversion involved the installation of a 6,000 imp gal (27,000 L; 7,200 US gal) plywood tank in the cargo bay with retractable pick-up scoops to allow uploading of water while the aircraft was taxiing. The scoops allowed 30 tons of water to be taken on board in 22 seconds. Later some of the hull fuel tanks were replaced with water tanks. The Martin Mars are not a part of the local Sproat Lake Volunteer Fire Department, although they have worked with the Sproat Lake Fire Department on at least 1 occasion

== Parks ==
In addition to a number of lakeside residences, the lake has three provincial parks on its shores: Sproat Lake Provincial Park, Taylor Arm Provincial Park, and Fossli Provincial Park.

== Gallery ==
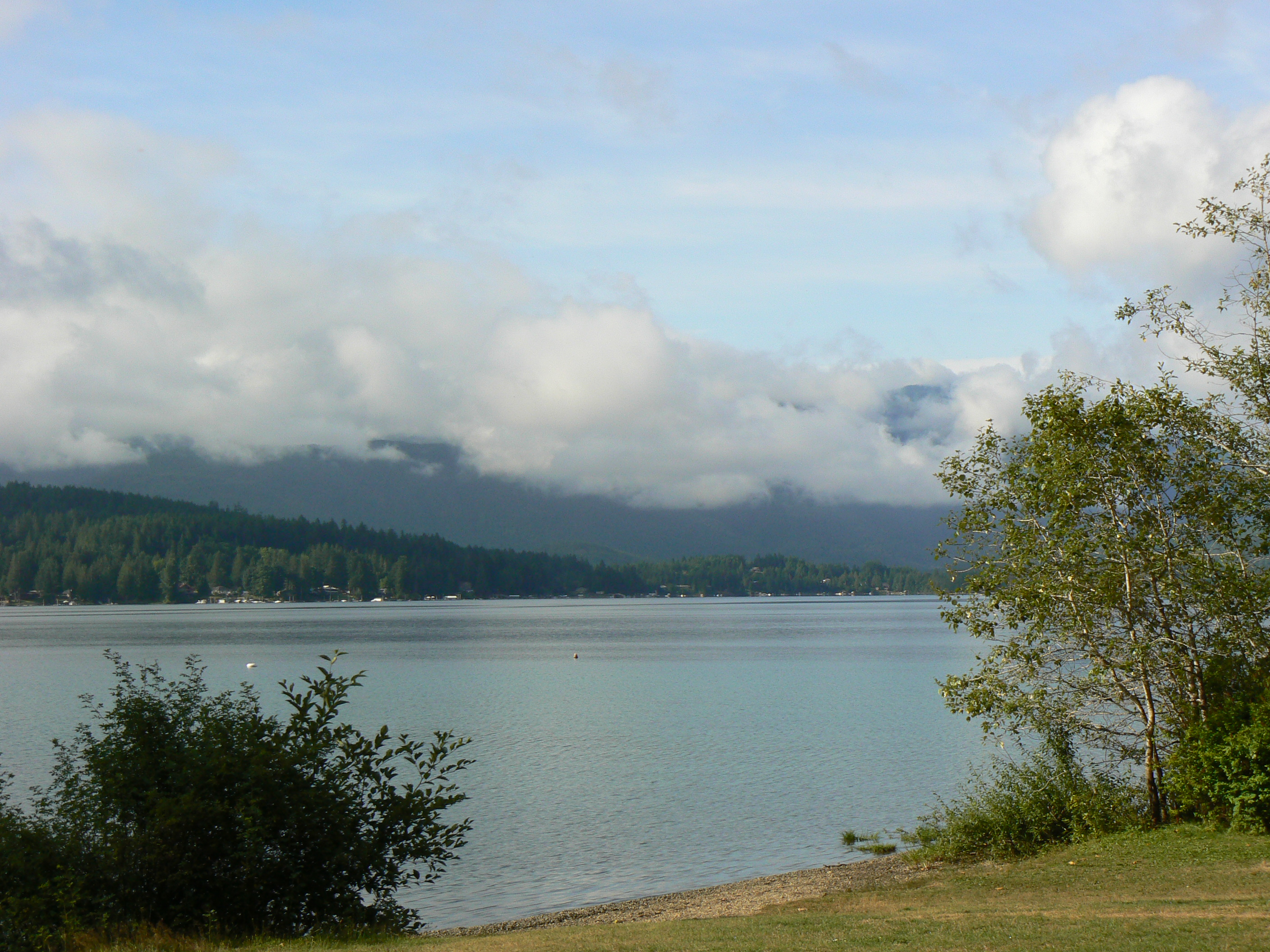
Morning at Sproat Lake Provincial Park

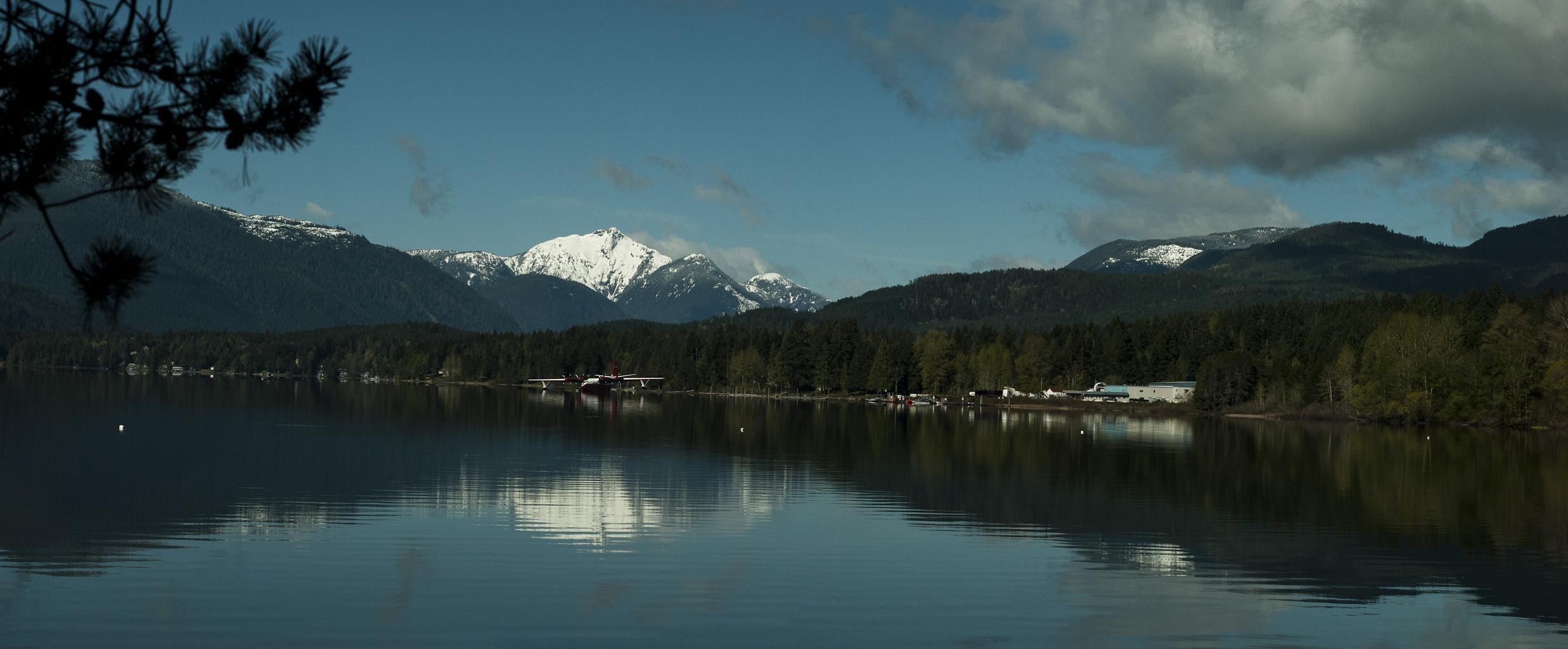
Klitsa Mountain above the lake

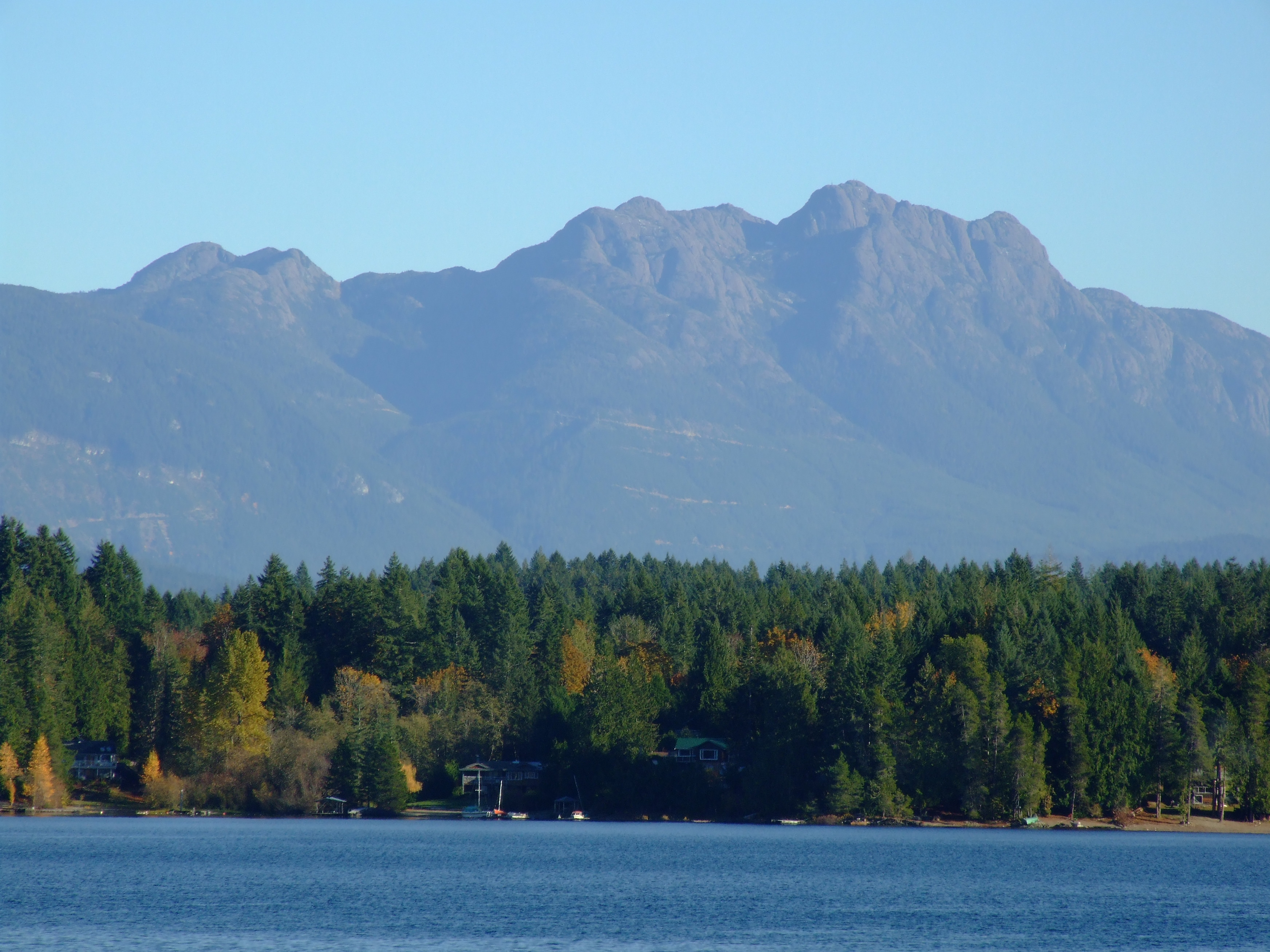
Summer view of Mount Arrowsmith

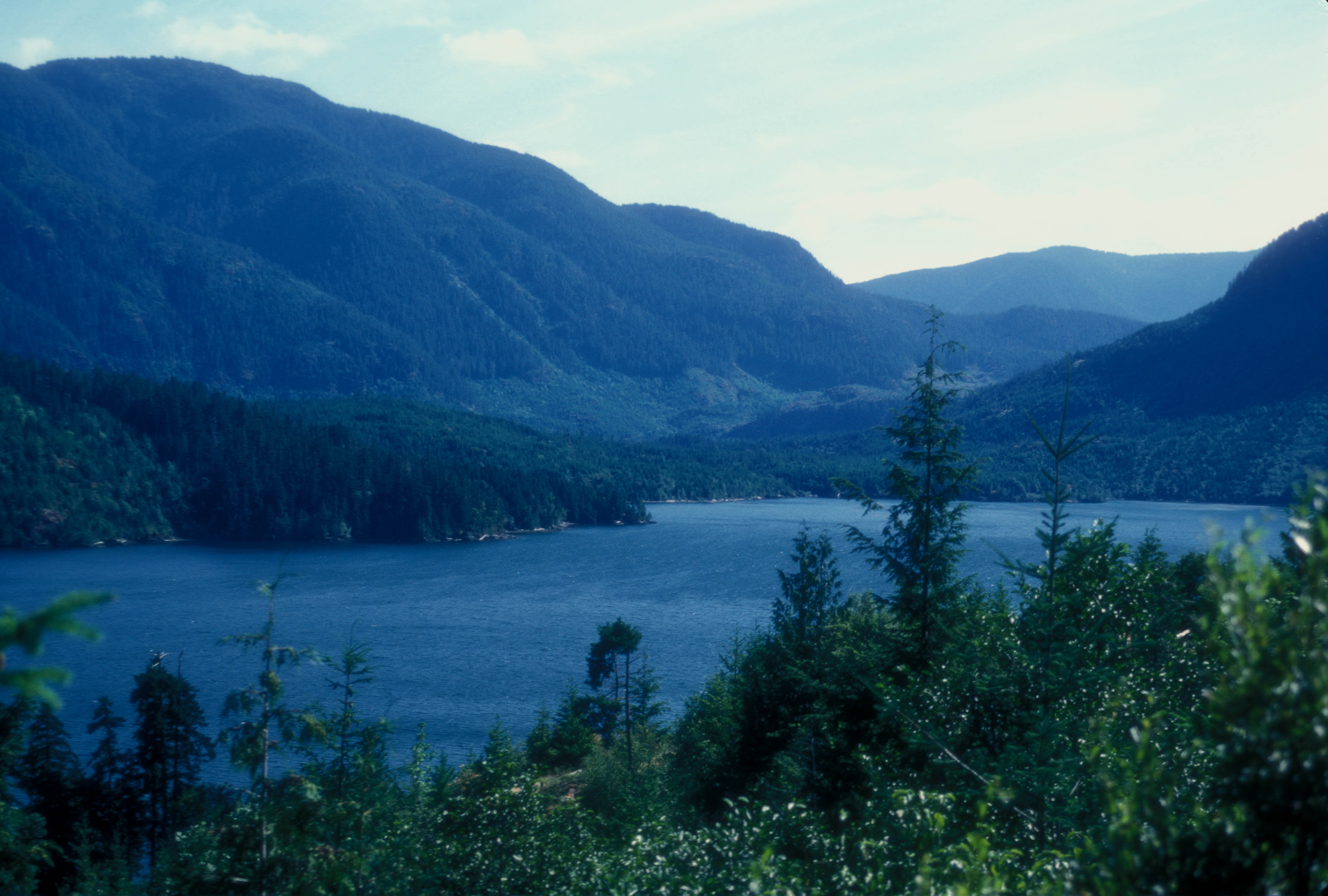
Taylor Arm

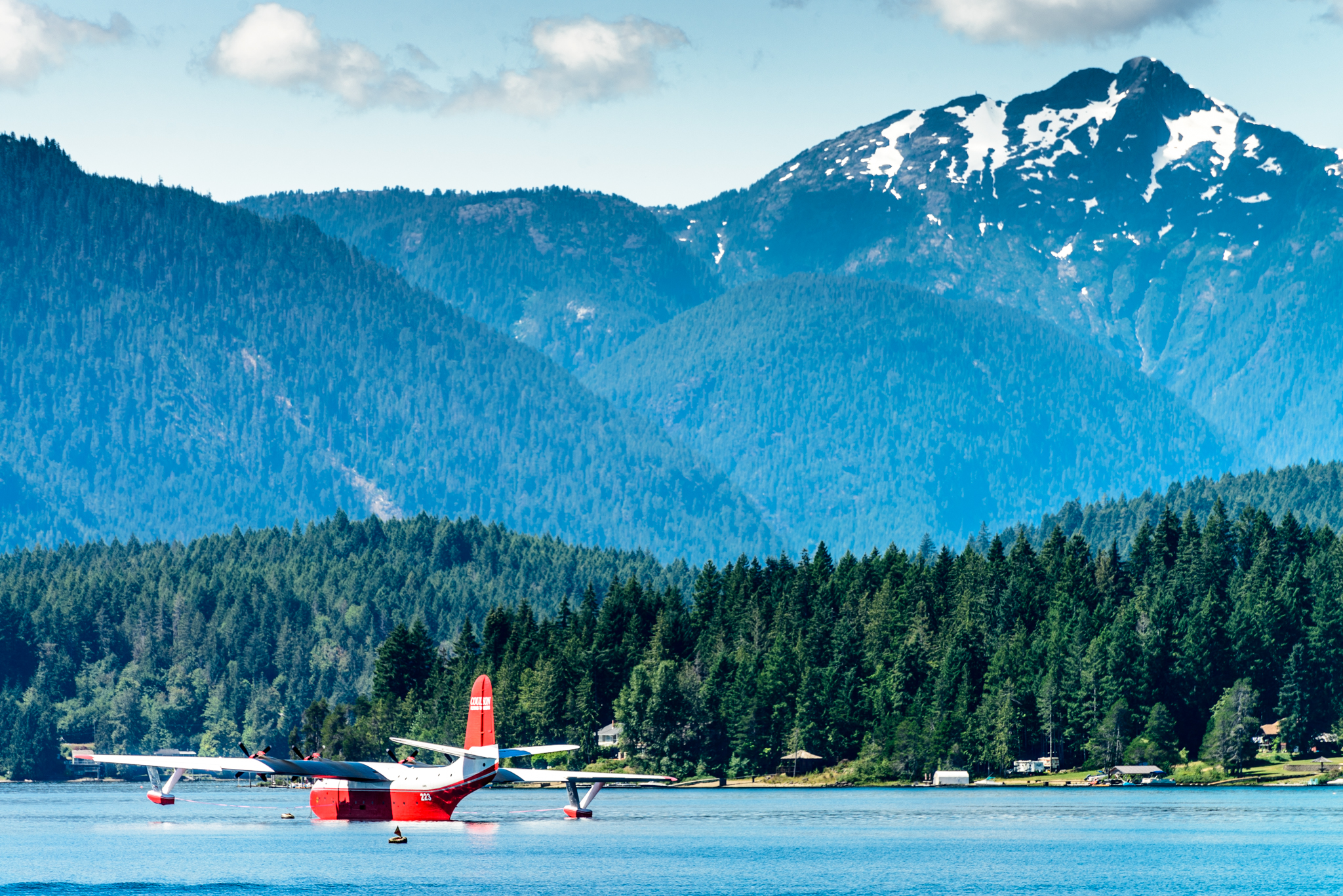
Mars water bomber and Mount Klitsa

== See also ==
- List of lakes of British Columbia
